= Pavlovce nad Uhom =

Pavlovce nad Uhom Pavlovcis
- Municipality
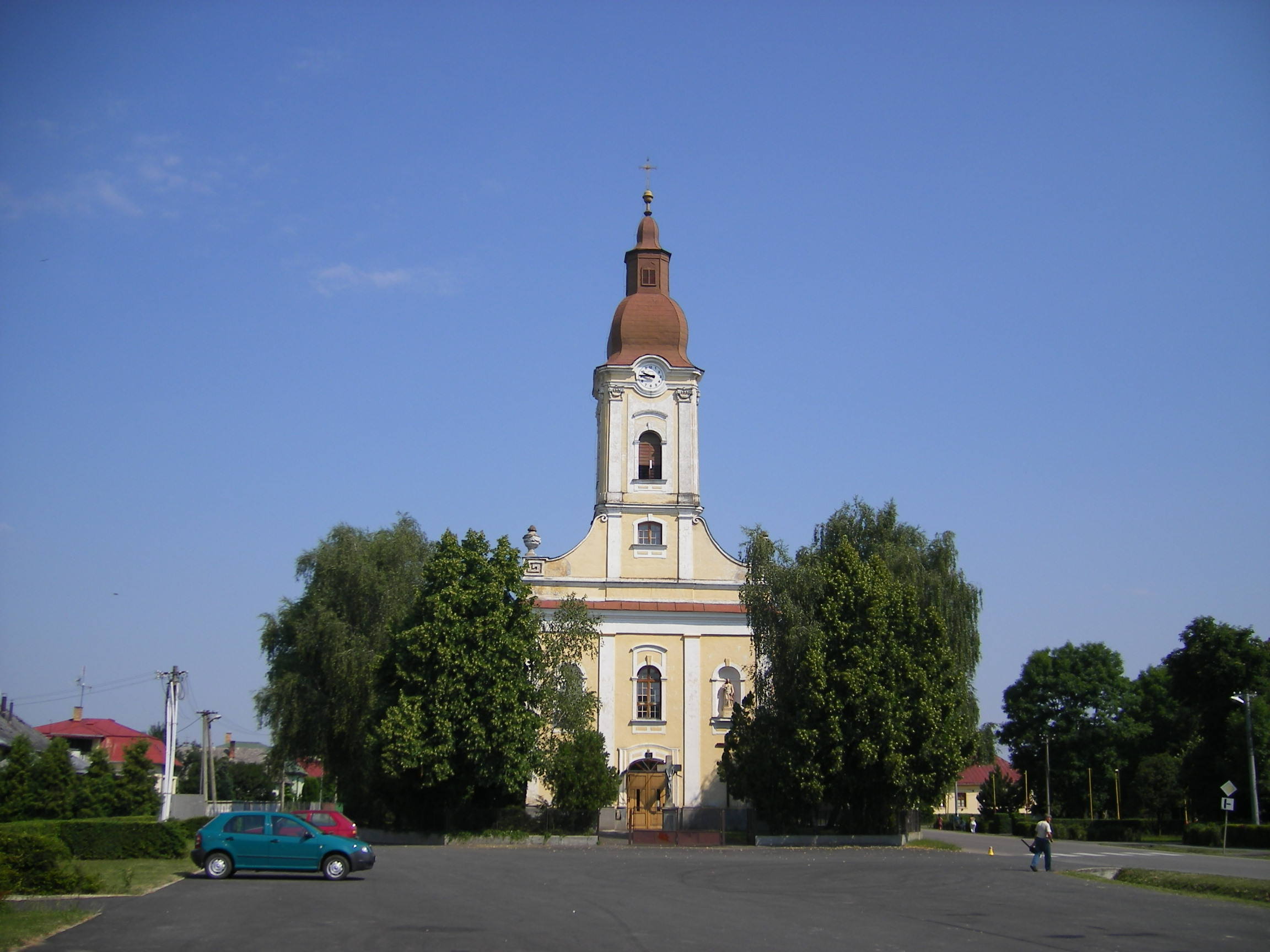

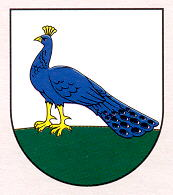
- Flag Coat of arms

- Location of Pavlovce nad Uhom in the Košice Region Location of Pavlovce nad Uhom in Slovakia
- Coordinates: 48.62°N 22.07°E
- Country: Slovakia
- Region: Košice Region
- District: Michalovce District
- First mentioned: 1327

Area
  - Total: 33.97 km^{2} (13.12 sq mi)
- Elevation: 106 m (348 ft)

Population (2025)
  - Total: 4,678
- Time zone: UTC+1 (CET)
  - Summer (DST): UTC+2 (CEST)
- Postal code: 721 4
- Area code: +421 56
- Vehicle registration plate (until 2022): MI
- Website: www.pavlovce.sk

Pavlovce nad Uhom (Romani: Pavlovcis, Hungarian: Pálóc) is a village and municipality in the Michalovce of the Košice Region of Eastern Slovakia. Pavlovce sits on the south bank of the Uzh River (Slovak: Uh), and is located about 8 km (5.0 mi) west of the border with Ukraine. The village has existed since at least the Late Middle Ages, appearing in historical records as early as 1327. As of 2021, Pavlovce was reported to have a population of 4,620 people.

== History ==
The origins and etymology of Pavlovce remain a subject of debate. According to the historian Professor Ferdinand Uličný, Pavlovce nad Uhom was established by Cuman watch-keeping units (in Russian: Половцы – Polovtsi, Polovci; in Slovak: Plavci). The name Pavlovce or Plavce was applied to the village by Slovak inhabitants and Hungarian nobles rather than the Cumans themselves. Others argue that the name was derived from the popular Slavic name Pavol.

After the dissolution of the Great Moravian Empire in the early 10th Century, the ascendant Kingdom of Hungary under the Árpád Dynasty seized the Eastern Slovak Lowland. The following centuries of Hungarian rule saw an influx of ethnic Hungarians mixed with the native Slavic and Slovak populations. The Hungarians fortified their conquest by establishing guard posts and settlements in strategic locations along the newly expanded frontier.

The first written mention of Pavlovce nad Uhom appears in a feudal donation agreement dated 1327. In this document, Charles I of Hungary confirmed the ownership of the village and surrounding lands by Zeman (freeholder) Peto Túz. A parish church is first mentioned in 1332.

In 1417, Emperor Sigismund of Luxembourg confirmed ownership to the brothers Matthew (died 1437) and George (died April 10, 1439, Esztergom) for their service to the Hungarian crown. They were ennobled under the title 'de Palócz' and would establish a manor centered in Pavlovce.

In the 15th and 16th centuries, the land holdings of the de Palócz family would expand to incorporate the surrounding villages of Bežovce, Blatná Polianka, Čabraď (pri Bežovciach), Chyzzer (pri Bajanoch), Kapušianske Kľačany, Iňačovce, Rebrín, Senné, Tašuľa a Záhor.

However, the rule of the Palócz family ended with the death of Anton of Pavlovce (died August 29, 1526), who was killed fighting the Ottoman Turks in the Hungarian defeat at the Battle of Mohács. As a result, the Dobó de Ruszka noble family became the new owners of Pavlovce Manor.

The 17th Century saw the spread of the Protestant Reformation throughout the Kingdom of Hungary accompanied by a series of anti-Turkish and anti-Habsburg wars. As in much of the rest of Europe, religious warfare burdened the local population with heavy taxes and the presence of encamped armies. In 1670, ownership changed again following the death of Mikuláš Forgáč's. It was divided among people such as George and Imrich Horváth de Palócz.

Following the Treaty of Szatmár in 1711, followers of the anti-Habsburg Transylvanian Prince Francis II Rákóczi (1676–1735) were forced, under threat of exile or seizure of property, to swear allegiance to the Habsburg king. This included two nobles from the de Palócz family, Francis Barkóci and George Horváth.

== Geography ==
The municipality lies at an altitude of 106 metres (348 ft) and covers an area of 33.97 km^{2} (13.12 sq mi) (2025).

The list of neighboring villages includes Senné and Bežovce to the north, Veškovce, Čierne pole, and Krišovská Liesková to the south, Vysoká nad Uhom and Bajany to the east, and Stretavka and Stretava to the west. It is located 8 kilometers from the border with Ukraine and 28 km by car from the Ukrainian city of Uzhhorod.

Under the old Kingdom of Hungary, the municipality was part of Ung County. Pavlovce nad Uhom, as the administrative unit that exists today, was created in 1960 through the merger of Pavlovce nad Uhom and the nearby settlement of Ťahyňa.

== Population ==
Population statistic (10 years)
Year	1995	2005	2015	2025
Count	3990	4535	4504	4678
Difference		+13.65%	−0.68%	+3.86%

Population statistic
Year	2024	2025
Count	4663	4678
Difference		+0.32%

It has a population of 4678 people (31 December 2025).

=== Ethnicity ===
Census 2021 (1+%)
Ethnicity	Number	Fraction
Slovak	4143	89.67%
Romani	462	10%
Not found out	321	6.94%
Total	4620	

In year 2021 was 4620 people by ethnicity 4143 as Slovak, 462 as Romani, 321 as Not found out, 25 as Hungarian, 11 as Ukrainian, 8 as Czech, 5 as Rusyn, 3 as Polish, 2 as Moravian, 1 as Other and 1 as English.

Note on population: The difference values of population numbers in the table "Population statistic" and in the sections "Ethnicity" & "Religion" is caused by the use of various statistical methods.

The vast majority of the municipality's population consists of the local Roma community. In 2019, they constituted an estimated 72% of the local population.

=== Religion ===
Census 2021 (1+%)
Religion	Number	Fraction
Roman Catholic Church	2187	47.34%
Not found out	1315	28.46%
None	438	9.48%
Greek Catholic Church	256	5.54%
Jehovah's Witnesses	149	3.23%
Apostolic Church	131	2.84%
Evangelical Church	57	1.23%
Total	4620	

In year 2021 was 4620 people by religion 2187 from Roman Catholic Church, 1315 from Not found out, 438 from None, 256 from Greek Catholic Church, 149 from Jehovah's Witnesses, 131 from Apostolic Church, 57 from Evangelical Church, 42 from Christian Congregations in Slovakia, 24 from Calvinist Church, 9 from Eastern Orthodox Church, 2 from Paganism and natural spirituality, 2 from Other, 2 from United Methodist Church, 2 from Baptists Church, 2 from Ad hoc movements, 1 from Other and not ascertained christian church and 1 from Church of Jesus Christ of Latter-day Saints.

According to 2008 data, the majority of the village's population (about 57.7%) is ethnically Roma. There has been allegations of ethnic segregation in the village, with Romani students being overrepresented in special education schools intended for children with disabilities.

== Geology and geomorphology ==
Geomorphologically, Pavlovce nad Uhom belongs to the East Slovak Plain and its subgroups of Kapušany Flatlands and Senné Wet Ground. The countryside of plains and flood plains consists of Holocene clay, loamy sand sediments, and the remains of old river beds.

Its geological structure consists of floodplain sediments, Pleistocene aeolian sands, and dunes.

== Climate ==
The area of Pavlovce nad Uhom is drained by the river Uzh, which originates in the Ukrainian Uzh Pass and leads to the river Laborec near the municipality of Stretavka. The total watershed of the river Uzh is 2,791 km^{2} (1,078 sq mi), including 792 km^{2} (306 sq mi) in Slovak territory. Its total length is 127 km (79 mi), including 19.6 km (12.2 mi) in Slovak territory. The average flow is 329 m^{3}/s (11,600 cu ft/s) and the maximum recorded is 1,420 m^{3}/s (50,000 cu ft/s).

A lake near Pavlovce nad Uhom, called Ortov, is connected to the river Uzh via an underground aquifer whose water level increases and decreases depending on the river flow. According to a map from 1863, several ponds, referred to as lakes by the locals, existed in the municipality's territory. The area is known for its high-quality groundwater.

The East Slovak Lowland has a subcontinental climate with an annual rainfall of 530 to 650 mm (21 to 26 in) and winters above −5 to 3 °C (23 to 37 °F). The average yearly temperature in Pavlovce nad Uhom is 9 °C (48 °F).

== Defunct architectural and historic monuments ==
Several historical buildings associated with the local nobility do not exist anymore, including those below.

=== Medieval church ===
A medieval church existed in the 13th century, according to the letters of George and Matthew de Palócz, which mentioned that the church contained their family tomb. The exact location of this church is unconfirmed.

=== Medieval mansion ===
Peter Túz or his sons established a medieval family mansion in Pavlovce, which later evolved into the fortified manor-house named Castellorum Palocz. Its ruins are likely located in the western part of a local park.

=== Baroque-Classicist manor house ===
The manor house was located in the center of the municipality, approximately 100 m (330 ft) south of the church and 40 m (130 ft) west of the main road. It had a 40 m × 50 m (130 ft × 160 ft) rectangular plan with towers in the corners, with a rhomboid-shaped plan. It was surrounded by a courtyard with inner dimensions of 25 m × 35 m (82 ft × 115 ft). Locals say that the manor house's four wings and four towers symbolized the four seasons, twelve chimneys for the twelve months, fifty-three rooms for fifty-three weeks, and 365 doors and windows for 365 days in a year.

The manor house was severely damaged after WWII, and was thus torn down by the locals in the 1950s. Many photographs of the manor house still exist in state-owned archives and private collections.

=== Garden pavilion ===
The pavilion was built in the Empire style, with a rectangular plan of 40 m × 14 m (131 ft × 46 ft).

=== Farmstead in Ortov ===
This Classicist agricultural building was once situated south of the floodplain forest near the tributary Ortov. The central part of the building served as a granary, the side wings as a sty, and the rest served various other agricultural purposes.

== Preserved architectural and historical monuments ==
=== Roman Catholic Church of St. John the Baptist ===
The church was completed in the 1790s. It is notable for its murals, including images of the church Esztergom Basilica on each side of the triumphal arch, painted in 1843. The single-aisle nave of the church is vaulted with two fields of Prussian vaults. A spiral staircase in the southern part of the church leads to the three-axis matroneum above, which contains the organ. The communion table, sanctuary, and celebrant pews are located in the northern part of the church. The room above the sacristy holds additional seats, once reserved for patrons and nobles in past centuries.

There is a wooden Classicist altar from 1800, with a modern statue of the Sacred Heart located in the right part of the triumphal arch, and a preserved original Classicist pulpit, with conic tribune and canopy on the left. The statue of the Immaculate Heart of Mary on the left, and the statue of the Sacred Heart on the right decorate the façade of the building. The church tower holds the belfry and clock mechanism.

=== Riding hall ===
The Neoclassical building, known as rajčuľňa among the locals, was likely built at the end of the 19th century.

=== The Holy Shrine of John of Nepomuk ===
The Holy Shrine of John of Nepomuk, built in 1899 in Neoclassical style, covers a late Baroque statue of the saint from the second half of the 18th century located south of the park (according to a historical map from 1863). The sandstone statue is modeled after a statue made by John Brokoff that was displayed on Charles Bridge. The depicted clothing consists of surplice and biretta, pointing to John of Nepomuk's occupation as vicar and priest. The polychrome statue of the saint features him standing on a pedestal holding a crucifix with corpus in his right hand, resting on his chest. The left hand, left alongside the body, carries a palm twig.

=== Defunct Manor House Park ===
The park, with an overall area of 19.89 ha (49.1 acres), was established in the first half of the 19th century near the defunct manor house, and is registered by the Monuments Board of the Slovak Republic, as a National Cultural Monument. The park's entrance is located at the center of the village. The park features two playgrounds, an amphitheater (which serves as a pub) with a stage and projecting masonry cab, a special elementary school yard, and a dilapidated pub called Letná. A mound is located in the western part.

The park is mostly flat except for the slope of the amphitheater, the mound Hurka, and the excavation with an adjacent embankment called Filagróvia.

The park contains the following plant species: oak, linden, maple, hornbeam, ash, sycamore, horse chestnut, hawthorn, hazel, privet, mulberry, elderberry, elm, willow, and ivy.

=== Greek Catholic Church of the Holy Trinity of Ease ===
The sacred building, which dates to the early 1890s and is situated in Ťahyňa, is registered by the Monuments Board of the Slovak Republic as a National Cultural Monument.

=== Jewish cemetery ===
A Jewish cemetery is located 1.5 km (0.93 mi) south of the municipality, on a hill near a floodplain forest surrounded by a cultivated field. Most of the tombstones are made of sandstone. The overgrown cemetery is not maintained, or registered as a National Cultural Monument. In the past, Jewish Salem and Mikvah also existed in the municipality.

== Notable people ==
- Paul (Pavol) Balla (born 17 April 1930, Pavlovce nad Uhom), Ukrainian visual artist.
- Francis (František) Barkóci (Barkóczy) (birth unknown – died 1709, Pavlovce nad Uhom), Zemplén County head, Kuruc general, later ennobled as a Count.
- John (Ján) Bubán (19 January 1914, Pavlovce nad Uhom – 24 November 1989, Pezinok), professor of theology and philosopher persecuted by the Communist regime in the 1950s.
- Stephen (Štefan) Bubán (29 July 1932, Pavlovce nad Uhom), graphic artist devoted to drawings, paintings, and monumental works.
- Andrei (Andrej) Budiš (Bugyis, Bugyiš) (6 December 1824, Pavlovce nad Uhom – 26 December 1890, Uzhgorod), Satu Mare diocese priest, known for his social activities.
- Andrei (Andrej) Budiš (Bugyis, Bugyiš) (5 December 1837, Pavlovce nad Uhom – 23 April 1864, Satu Mare), writer, priest and journalist.
- George (Juraj) Čalfa (Csalfa) (1 April 1905, Ťahyňa – 23 July 1962, Čeľovce), Roman Catholic priest persecuted by the Communist regime in the 1950s.
- John (Ján) Hadik (23 November 1863, Pavlovce nad Uhom – 10 December 1933, Budapest), member of the Diet of Hungary, Secretary of Ministry of Interior, count, officer.
- Adam Horvát (Horváth) (30 April 1691, Pavlovce nad Uhom – 22 October 1746), noble, author of descriptive work on Ung County titled Descriptio Comitatus Unghvariensis.
- John (Ján) Horvát (Horváth) (17th century), noble, George Rákóczi's secretary, author of historical study.
- Joseph (Jozef) Jóna (7 November 1863, Irša – death unknown), Roman Catholic priest active in Pavlovce, the papal chamberlain (Mukachevo).
- Adalbert Kazinci (Kazinczy) (1871, Pavlovce nad Uhom – 3 November 1947, USA), priest and journalist active in the U.S.
- John (Ján) Kondor (born 5 June 1953, Pavlovce nad Uhom), poet, journalist, editor for Radio Studio of Slovak Radio in Košice.
- Valentine (Valentín) Novajovský, teacher, platoon commander of participants in the Slovak National Uprising.
- Anton Palóci (Palóczy) (died 29 August 1526, near Mohács), noble, county head of Zemplén County.
- George (Juraj) Palóci (Palóczy) (died 10 May 1439, Esztergom) Transylvanian bishop, archbishop of Esztergom, Hungarian chancellor and anti-Hussite movement organizer.
- Ladislav Palóci (Palóczy) (died 1470), noble, county head of Zemplén County, Sigismund's of Luxembourg knight.

== Government ==
While Pavlovce has a birth register office and police station, it depends on the district and tax offices in Michalovce.

== Transport ==
The nearest railway station is 6 km (3.7 mi) away. The village is served by buses to Veľké Kapušany, Michalovce, and Jenkovce that leave every 30 minutes.
