= Pavlovce =

Pavlovce may refer to:

- Pavlovce, Rimavská Sobota District, a municipality in southern Slovakia
- Pavlovce (Vranov nad Topľou District), a municipality in eastern Slovakia
- Pavlovce nad Uhom, a municipality in eastern Slovakia
