= Isabella Jagiellon =

16th-century queen consort of Hungary

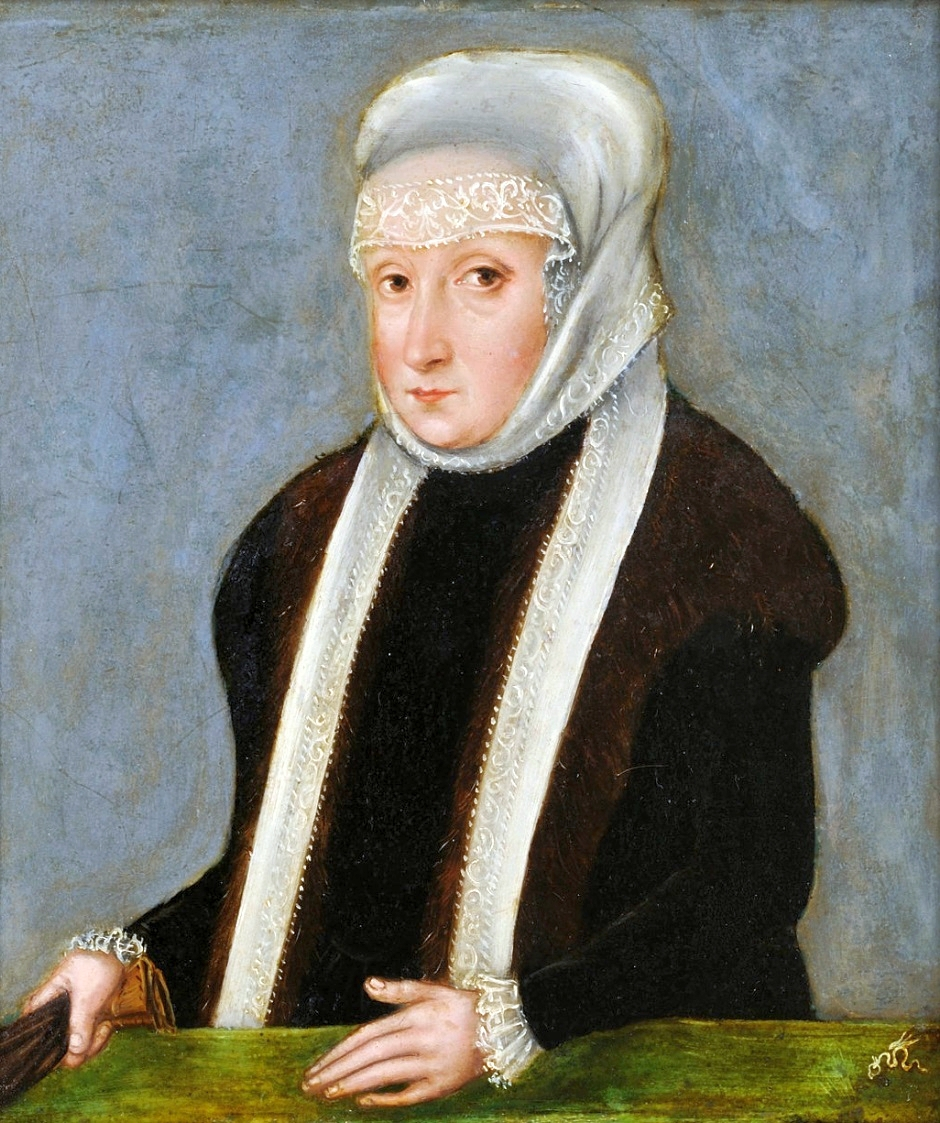
- Portrait by Lucas Cranach the Younger, 1553

Queen consort of Hungary
- Tenure: 1539–1540
- Coronation: 23 February 1539; Székesfehérvár, Hungary
- Born: 18 January 1519; Kraków, Poland
- Died: 15 September 1559 (aged 40); Gyulafehérvár, Transylvania, Ottoman Empire
- Burial: St. Michael's Cathedral, Alba Iulia
- Spouse: John Zápolya
- Issue: John Sigismund Zápolya
- Dynasty: Jagiellon
- Father: Sigismund I the Old
- Mother: Bona Sforza

Isabella Jagiellon (Hungarian: Izabella királyné; Polish: Izabela Jagiellonka; Lithuanian: Izabelė Jogailaitė; 18 January 1519 – 15 September 1559) was a princess of the Kingdom of Poland and of the Grand Duchy of Lithuania, and later also the Queen consort of Hungary. She was the oldest child of Sigismund I the Old, King of Poland and Grand Duke of Lithuania, and his Italian wife Bona Sforza.

In 1539, she married John Zápolya, Voivode of Transylvania and King of Hungary. At the time Hungary was contested between Ferdinand of Austria who wanted to add it to the Habsburg domains (see Royal Hungary), local nobles who wanted to keep Hungary independent (see Eastern Hungarian Kingdom), and Sultan Suleiman the Magnificent who saw it as a vassal state of the Ottoman Empire (see also Little War in Hungary). While Isabella's marriage lasted only a year and a half, it did produce a male heir – John Sigismund Zápolya born just two weeks before his father's death in July 1540.

She spent the rest of her life embroiled in succession disputes on behalf of her son. Her husband's death sparked renewed hostilities but Sultan Suleiman established her as a regent of the eastern regions of the medieval Kingdom of Hungary on behalf of her infant son. The region developed as a semi-independent buffer state noted for its freedom of religion.

Ferdinand, however, never renounced his claims to reunite Hungary and conspired with Bishop George Martinuzzi who forced Isabella to abdicate in 1551. She returned to her native Poland to live with her family. Sultan Suleiman retaliated and threatened to invade Hungary in 1555–56 forcing nobles to invite Isabella back to Transylvania. She returned in October 1556 and ruled as her son's regent until her death in September 1559.

== Biography ==
=== Early life and marriage plans ===
Born in Kraków on 18 January 1519, Isabella was the oldest child of King Sigismund I the Old and his Italian wife Bona Sforza. She spent most of her childhood at Wawel Castle in Kraków and the hunting castle in Niepołomice. She also lived in the Grand Duchy of Lithuania in 1527–29 and 1533–36. During the latter visit her three younger sisters were left in Kraków. This episode foreshadowed future family relationships: Bona Sforza favored her oldest daughter, arranging her marriage early, while the other three daughters were neglected and married late. Isabella received a good education, including from humanist Johannes Honter, and she could speak and write four languages: Polish, Latin, German, and Italian (her mother's native language).

In March 1519, when Isabella was just a two-month-old baby, French envoys proposed to marry Isabella with a future son of Francis I of France in exchange for Sigismund's support in the upcoming elections for the Holy Roman Emperor. Sigismund supported Charles V, but Bona continued to pursue a French marriage for Isabella. She hoped that King of France would install his son and Isabella in the Duchy of Milan which Bona claimed as her inheritance. In 1524, Hieronymus Łaski negotiated an anti-Turkish alliance with the French; among the provisions was marriage of Isabella and Henry, second son of Francis I. But this alliance failed after Francis was taken prisoner in the Battle of Pavia.

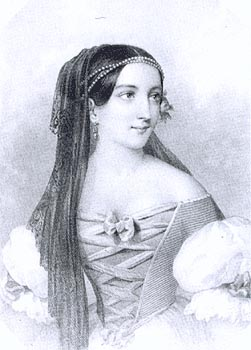
19th-century depiction of Isabella by Miklós Barabás

Bona then pursued an Italian marriage. Isabella of Naples, Isabella's grandmother, sent envoys to Poland to propose marriage to Francesco II Sforza, newly installed Duke of Milan. However, Sigismund refused as the duchy was contested and Francesco's hold was tenuous. Bona then proposed Federico II Gonzaga, Duke of Mantua, but he chose Margaret Paleologa as she brought March of Montferrat as her inheritance. Sigismund wanted a Habsburg marriage. In 1530, he proposed Archduke Maximilian, eldest son of King Ferdinand, but they refused as Isabella was eight years older than the groom. When Habsburgs wanted to stop the proposed marriage between Isabella and John Zápolya, they proposed Ludovico, eldest son of Charles III, Duke of Savoy, but he died in 1536.

Around 1531, a plan emerged to wed Isabella to John Zápolya, King of Hungary. When Louis II of Hungary was killed in the Battle of Mohács in 1526, Hungary was divided between pro-Habsburg Royal Hungary and pro-Zápolya Eastern Hungarian Kingdom. The parties were engaged in the Little War in Hungary. Zápolya had sustained his claim only by gaining support from and becoming vassal of the Ottoman Empire. Bona Sforza, ardent opponent of the Habsburgs, supported Zápolya and tried to convince her husband Sigismund to provide military support and Isabella's hand. Sigismund, whose first wife was Zápolya's sister Barbara, refused, not wanting to upset the Habsburgs and doubting Zápolya's ability to hold onto his throne. Eventually, Sigismund relented on a condition that a peace treaty was concluded between Zápolya and the Habsburgs. The Treaty of Nagyvárad was signed in February 1538 in part due to Sigismund's requirement. Ferdinand and Zápolya agreed to divide Hungary between themselves and that Ferdinand was to inherit Zápolya's territory since at that time he was childless.

=== Queen of Hungary ===
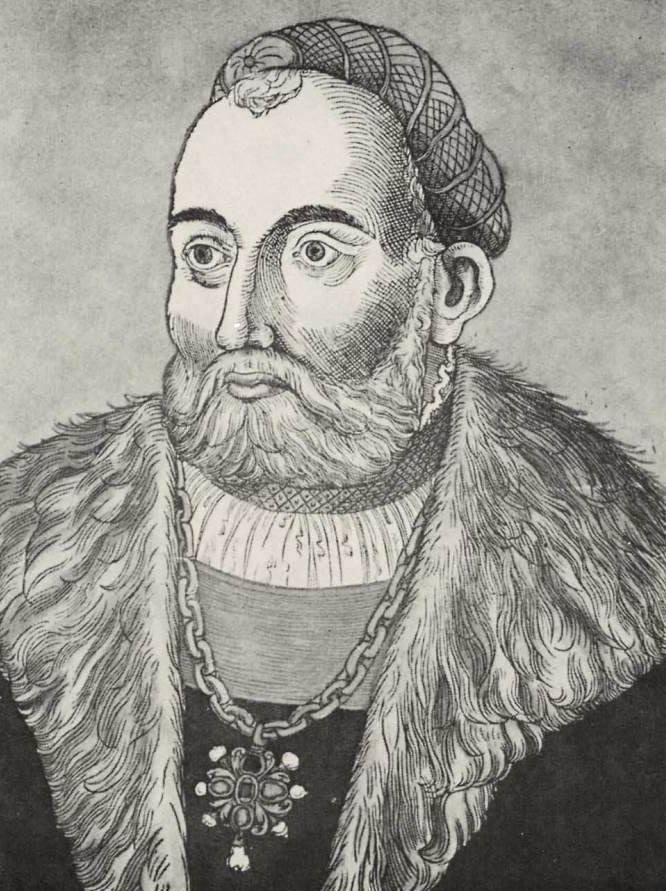
Portrait of John Zápolya

In April 1538, just two months after the Treaty of Nagyvárad, Bishop Stjepan Brodarić arrived at Kraków to negotiate timing and conditions for the wedding of Isabella and John Zápolya. Polish nobles considered the wedding to be ill-conceived and not beneficial, but it proceeded. On 15 January 1539, five hundred Hungarian knights arrived at Kraków. The betrothal took place on 26 January. The per procura wedding date is not known exactly, but it was probably between 28 January and 2 February. After the ceremony, Isabella departed towards Hungary. Her dowry was 32,000 ducats in cash plus property worth another 6,000 ducats. Through Buda she reached Székesfehérvár where she met John Zápolya for the first time on 22 February. He granted her the towns of Solymos, Lippa, Déva, Csicsó, Tokaj, parts of Debrecen and Regéc castles. The next day the wedding ceremony took place and Isabella was crowned as Queen of Hungary. The wedding feast continued for a week in Buda.

The married life was short and not happy. 20-year-old Isabella had to deal with a 52-year-old husband who complained of gout and overall ill health. In spring 1540, Zápolya traveled to quell a revolt in Transylvania by Ștefan Mailat (Hungarian: Majláth István). Isabella stayed in Buda as she was pregnant. Their son John Sigismund Zápolya was born on 7 July 1540. Zápolya succeeded in subduing the rebels, but he died on 22 July from cerebral hemorrhage.

=== Regency ===
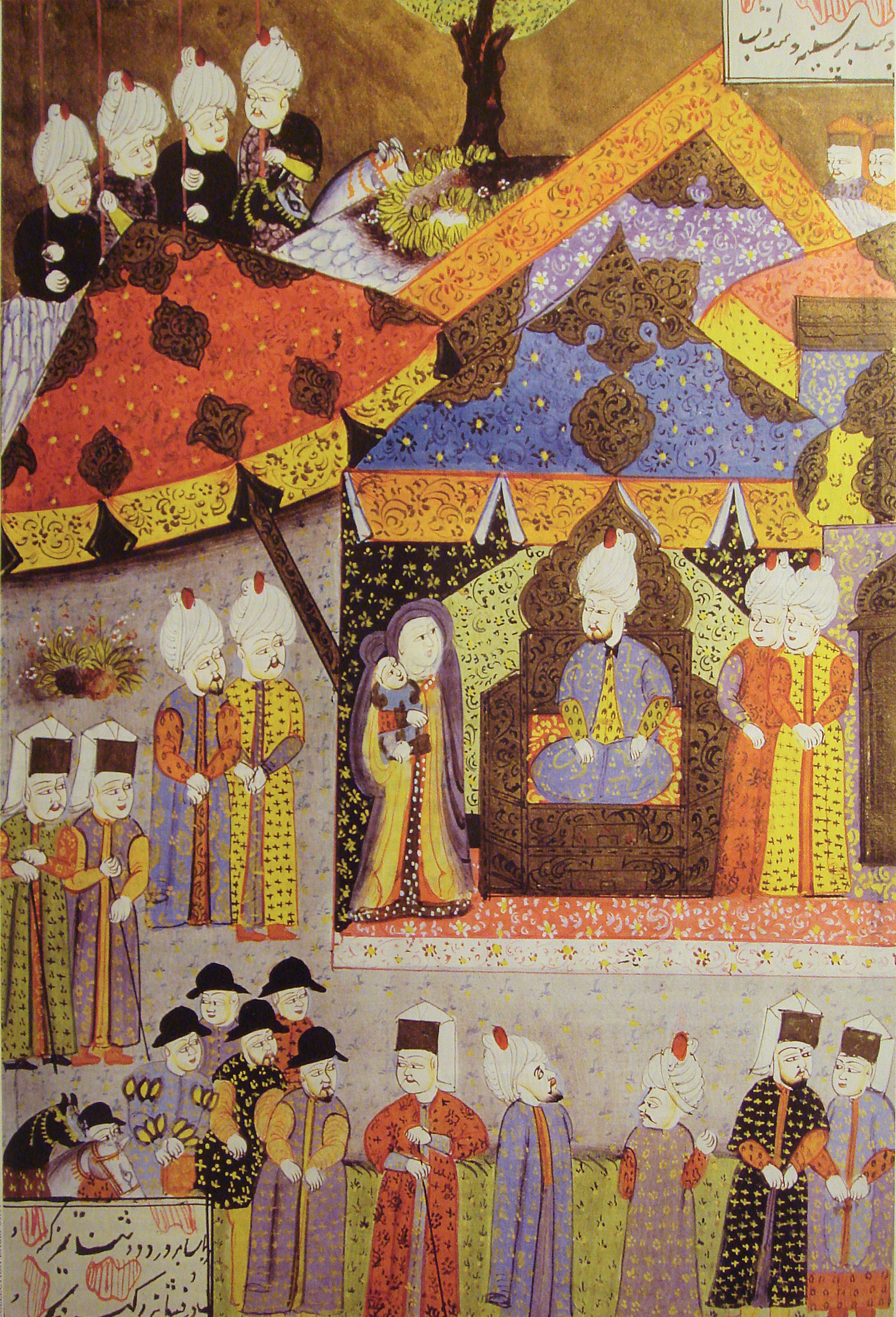
Suleiman receives Isabella and her infant son John Sigismund in 1541

According to the Treaty of Nagyvárad, John Zápolya was to be succeeded by Ferdinand, but Hungarian nobles, particularly Bishop George Martinuzzi, refused to abide by it and in September 1540 elected the infant John Sigismund as King of Hungary and Isabella as his regent. Ferdinand invaded Hungary and besieged Buda where Isabella and her son sought shelter. The city withstood the first siege in November 1540 and the second siege in May 1541 was lifted by Suleiman the Magnificent, Sultan of the Ottoman Empire. She did not receive help from her father Sigismund I the Old. Suleiman preferred a fragmented Hungary but understood that only he could protect it from the Habsburgs. Therefore, he annexed most of Hungary and only Transylvania and lands east of the Tisza river (known as Temesköz) were given to John Sigismund and Isabella as his guardian. These appointments were accepted by the Transylvanian Diet acknowledging its status as a vassal of the Ottoman Empire.

In September 1541, Isabella departed Buda and took up residence in Lippa, then in Gyál and Gyulafehérvár. She complained about ruinous state of her new domains and financial troubles. Isabella was young, noted for her beauty, and scolded for her expensive tastes. Three surviving pieces of jewelry are attributed to her: a diamond ring, a large pendant with 16 opals, and a gold necklace. She began reconstruction of the former bishop's palace in Alba Iulia in the Renaissance style according to the examples of Wawel Castle in her native Kraków and Royal Palace in Buda. She faced multiple political challenges: keeping peace with the Ottomans, containing Martinuzzi's ambitions, and blocking Ferdinand's attempts at taking over Transylvania. In December 1541, perhaps exhausted by her circumstances, Isabella signed an agreement with Ferdinand: she would abandon Transylvania and take up residence in the Szepes County. However, when Ottomans attacked again, Ferdinand did not have enough military power to defend his territories (see Siege of Esztergom (1543)) and the agreement remained forgotten. Poland proposed to solve the issue with another marriage – Isabella would marry widowed Charles V, Holy Roman Emperor, Ferdinand, or his eldest son Maximilian. But Ferdinand hoped that he could acquire Transylvania by other means.

In 1548, when the Ottomans gathered all their forces for an assault against Persia in the ongoing Ottoman–Safavid War (1532–55), Ferdinand and Martinuzzi began negotiations to unite Hungary and defend it against the Ottomans. The agreement was reached on 1 August 1549 in Nyírbátor. Isabella would give up Transylvania in exchange for Opole and Racibórz in Silesia. Ferdinand was also to provide for John Sigismund, who would later marry one of his daughters. Martinuzzi was to be made Archbishop of Gran, and to receive the cardinal's hat. Isabella defended her rights and took up arms. She did not receive help from her brother Sigismund II Augustus as he concluded an alliance with Ferdinand so that he could quell opposition of Polish nobility to his marriage to Barbara Radziwiłł.

=== Return to Poland ===
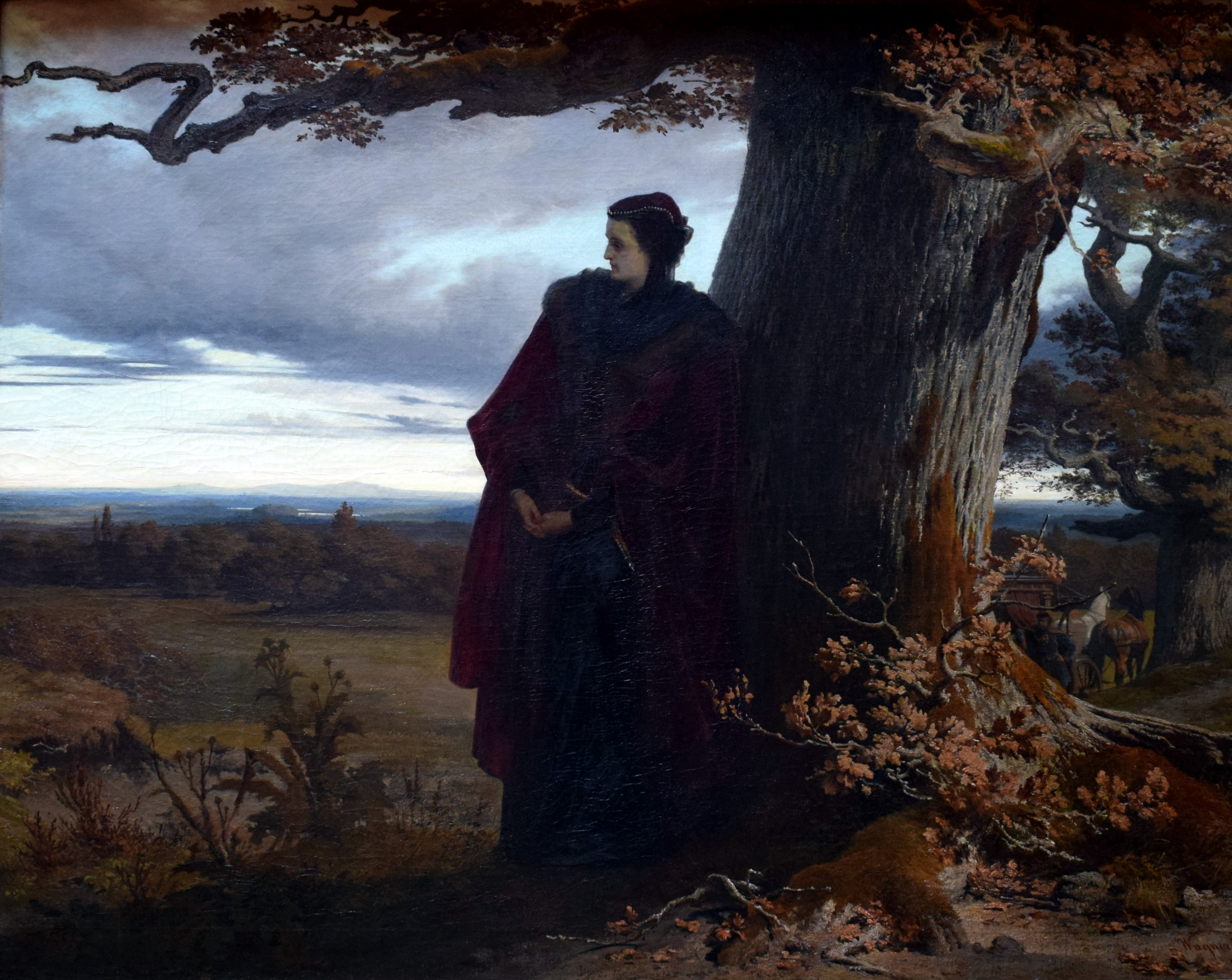
Queen Isabella's Farewell to Transylvania by Alexander von Wagner

In fall 1550, Isabella's troops defended Gyulafehérvár, but had to agree to a truce. She gained support from nobility in the diet of Aiud, but her forces were defeated near Cenad and she was besieged in Buda. In July 1551, facing superior forces, Isabella surrendered and signed the Treaty of Weissenburg. She agreed to give up Transylvania in exchange for the Duchy of Opole and Racibórz, and other territories so that her annual income would be 25,000 florins. For her domains in Hungary, which were valued at 140,000 florins, Isabella was to receive Ziębice, Ząbkowice Śląskie, and 100,000 florins in cash. John Sigismund was to marry one of Ferdinand's daughters. In August, Isabella gave up the Holy Crown of Hungary. According to Marcin Bielski, the cross atop of the crown was broken off and kept by John Sigismund who hoped one day to reunite the pieces. At the same time, John Sigismund was betrothed to 4-year-old Joanna of Austria.

In September 1551, Isabella departed from Transylvania. According to a legend, when Isabella stopped to have a rest at the gates of Meszes, a border town, she cut the abbreviation of her motto into the bark of an old oak tree: SFV – Sic fata volunt ("It is the will of fate"). The same motto can be found on her jewelry and her coins. She reached Opole in March 1552 to find it devastated. The buildings where she was to live were unsuitable for habitation, the income was only half of what the treaty provided, and Ferdinand did not hurry to pay the agreed cash sums. Only a month later she departed Opole towards Poland where she lived with her family for the next five years. To provide her with income, her brother granted her Krzepice and Sanok, while her mother gave her Wieluń. Despite being outside the Duchy of Opole, she showed interest in its affairs. She influenced the appointment of the parish priest of the church in Prudnik and indirectly supported local Lutherans.

=== Return to Transylvania ===
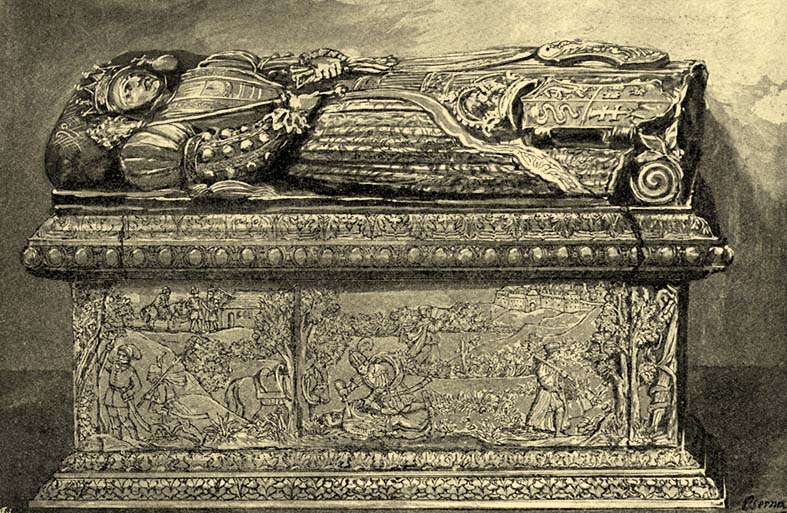
Tomb of Isabella at St. Michael's Cathedral, Alba Iulia

The situation in Hungary was not stable. George Martinuzzi was assassinated in December 1551, while the Ottomans captured Cenad and unsuccessfully besieged Eger. Isabella received invitations both from Sultan Suleiman, who sent an envoy to Poland, and local nobles to return to Hungary, but she delayed. Her brother King Sigismund II Augustus, afraid of a Habsburg–Russian alliance in the series of the Muscovite–Lithuanian Wars, married Catherine of Austria, daughter of Ferdinand. Isabella and her mother Bona Sforza demanded that Ferdinand fulfilled his obligations according to the Treaty of Weissenburg, but he did not have financial resources to comply and asked for concessions. Isabella decided that since he did not hold up his end of the bargain, she was not bound by the treaty and resolved to return to Hungary.

In February 1556, Isabella and her mother Bona, who was returning to her native Italy, departed Warsaw towards Silesia. She spent the summer in Lwów waiting for an opportune moment to return. Accompanied by Ottoman troops, she entered Kolozsvár in October. On 25 November 1556, the Transylvanian Diet entrusted her with a five-year regency period on behalf of her 16-year-old son. Isabella set up her Transylvanian chancellery with the help of Mihály Csáky. She minted her own gold ducats that depicted Madonna and Child on one side and composite coat of arms on the other. The coat of arms included: wolf and unicorn of the Zápolya family, Patriarchal cross and four horizontal stripes of Hungary, eagle of Poland, snake of the Sforza/Visconti families, and three panther heads of Dalmatia. In 1558, her supporter Melchior Balassa foiled a coup by the Kendi family against her. In addition to political strife, there were religious differences as well since Protestantism spread into Hungary. In 1557, Isabella signed an edict granting freedom of religion to four denominations – Catholics, Lutherans, Calvinists, and Unitarians. It was a pioneering move towards religious tolerance and an important step towards the Edict of Torda of 1568. Isabella is noted as the first European ruler to issue laws on religious tolerance.

Isabella died of a long illness in September 1559, just three years after her return to Transylvania.

== Ancestry ==
Ancestors of Isabella Jagiellon

8. Ladislaus II, King of Poland
4. Casimir IV the Jagiellonian, King of Poland
9. Sophia of Halshany
2. Sigismund I the Old
10. Albert II of Germany
5. Elizabeth of Austria
11. Elizabeth of Luxembourg
1. Isabella Jagiellon
12. Galeazzo Maria Sforza
6. Gian Galeazzo Sforza
13. Bona of Savoy
3. Bona Sforza
14. Alfonso II of Naples
7. Isabella of Naples
15. Ippolita Maria Sforza

Royal titles
Isabella Jagiellon Jagiellonian dynasty Born: 18 January 1519 Died: 15 September 1559
Preceded by Mary of Austria	Queen consort of Hungary; 1539–1540	Succeeded by Maria of Spain
