= Health in Slovakia =

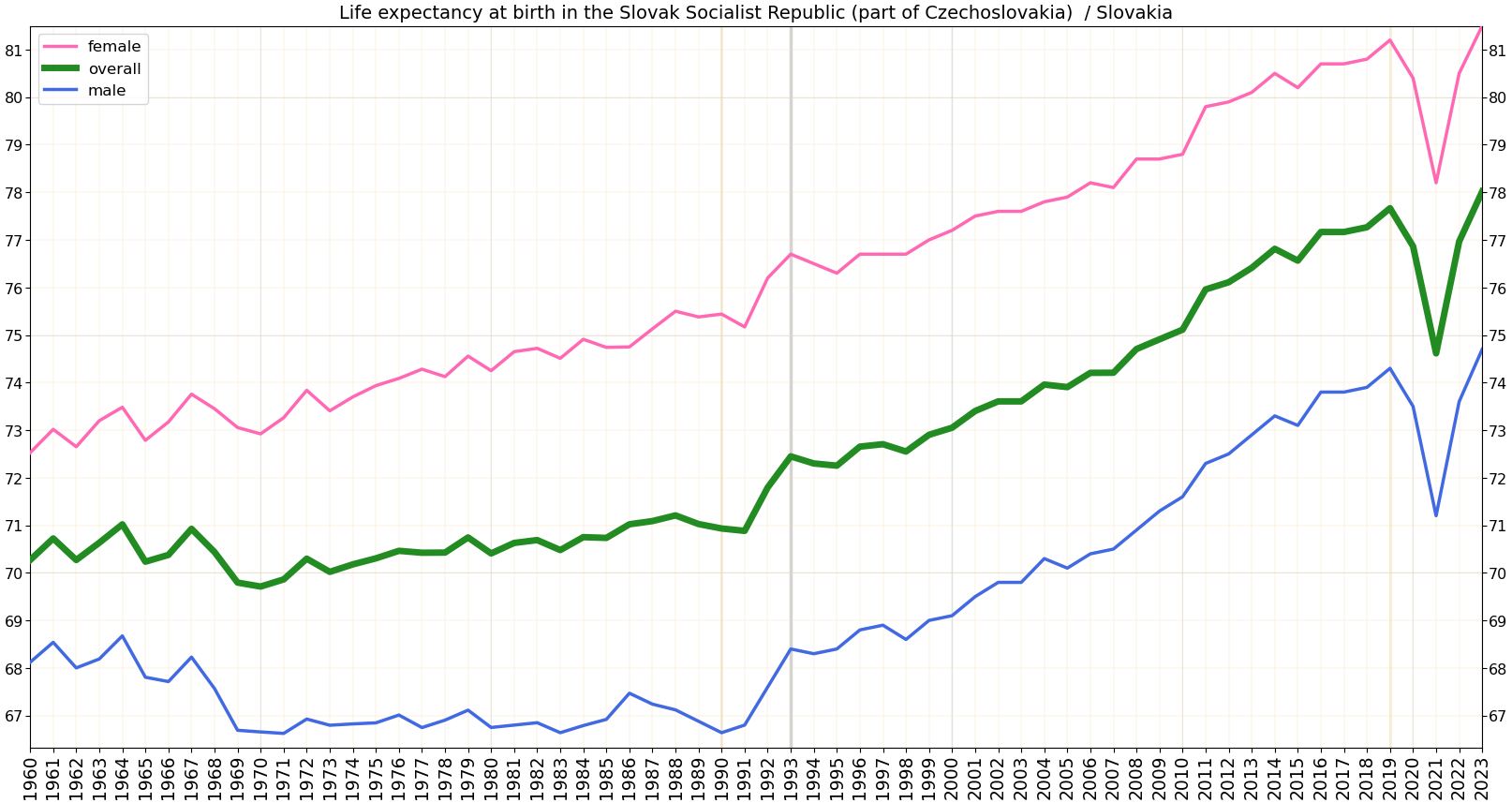
Life expectancy at birth in Slovakia

Slovakia had the fourth highest rate of death from communicable disease in Europe in 2015, at 35 per 100,000 population.

Slovakia has public (obligatory) health insurance.

== Healthcare ==
The Euro health consumer index ranked Slovakia 24th of 35 European countries in 2015, noting that a system of private additional healthcare insurance has recently been established.

== See also ==
- Healthcare in Slovakia
- List of hospitals in Slovakia
