= Healthcare in Slovakia =

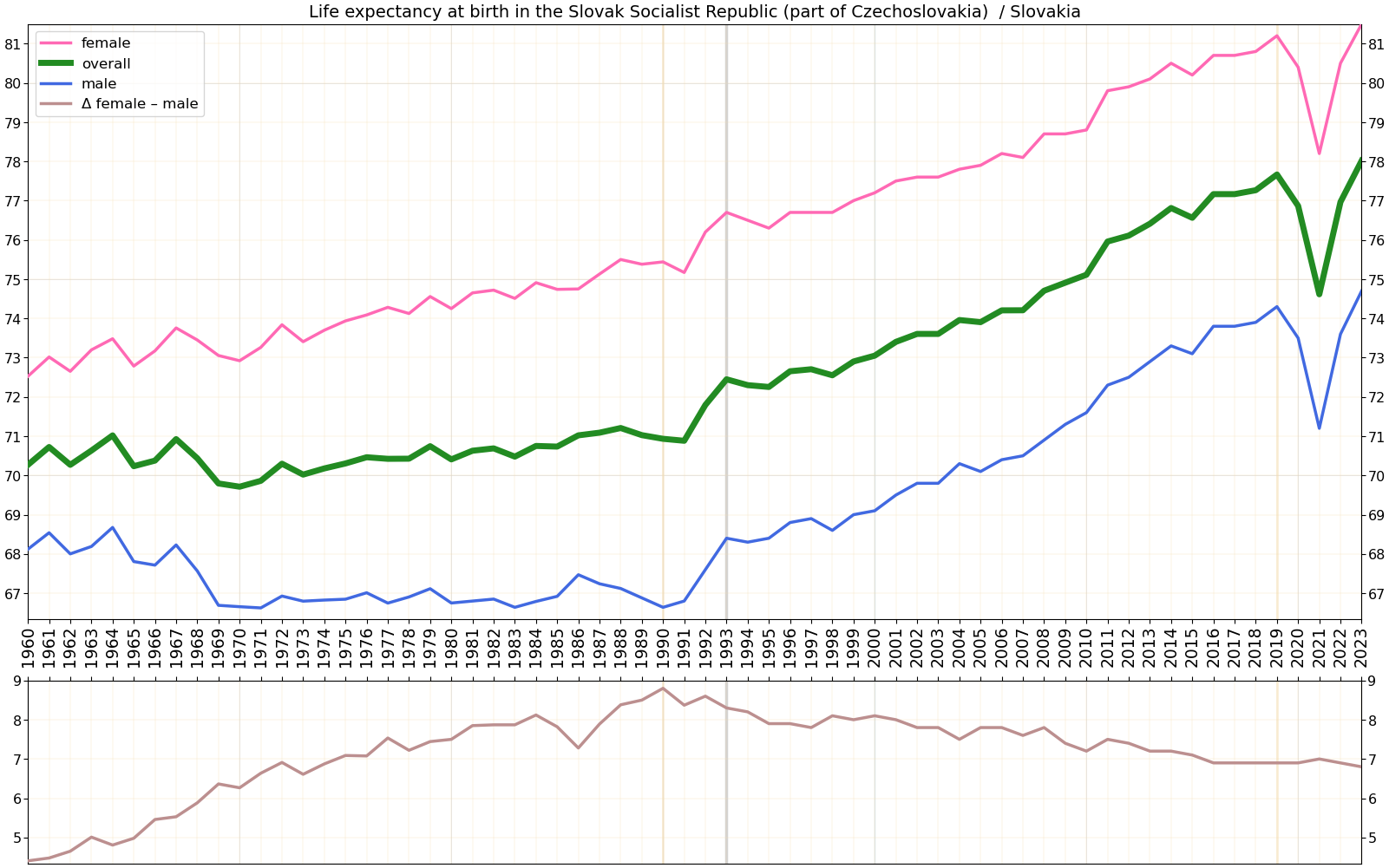
Life expectancy development in Slovakia by gender

Healthcare in Slovakia has features of the Bismarck, the Beveridge and the national health insurance systems. Its public health system is paid largely from taxation. The cost of national health insurance is shared between the employees and the employers. Part of the taxes is paid by employees as a deduction from their wages and the remaining part is paid as a compulsory contribution by employers. Sole traders pay the full amount of the taxes.

The taxes are managed by health insurance companies. The healthcare system has three health insurance companies: Union (12,4%), Dôvera (32,4%) and Všeobecná zdravotná poisťovňa (55,2%)(market share). Všeobecná zdravotná poisťovňa is a state-run insurance company, and the other two are private. The insurance companies have contracts with outpatient clinics, hospitals, rehabilitation centres, pharmacies etc. However, insurance companies do not cover all costs such as some medicines. Also, dental treatment is not covered.

The government pays health insurance for children, students, pensioners, invalids, those performing activities for churches, religious or charitable communities etc.

According to the new legislation from 1.1.2024, the employees contribute 4% (at least 10,75 EUR), and employers contribute 11% (at least 29,57). In the case of invalidity, the contribution is reduced by half.

Medical procedures are assigned an artificial value of points which is converted to real monetary value by health insurance companies. General practitioners get a capitation payment for each registered patient. There are reimbursement limits, which can be exceeded in respect of individual patients by negotiation.

== International comparison ==
Slovakia was placed 17th in Europe by the Euro Health Consumer Index (EHCI) in 2024, when it compared 35 systems.

It was placed given 45th worldwide in 2023.(statista)

Slovak healthcare in 2022 was placed 35th (health spending), 13th (hospital beds), 10th (length of hospital stay) and 33rd (life expectancy at birth).

== Finance and resources ==
In 2023, Slovakia spends $2756 per capita on health, less than the OECD average of $4986 (USD PPP), with $2210 from government or compulsory sources and $546 from voluntary sources. The voluntary contribution was the third lowest of European countries compared, after Croatia and Romania, ata $2756 per capita on health is equal to 7.8% of GDP, compared to 9.2% on average in the OECD. There were 3.7 practising doctors per 1,000 people (OECD average 3.7) and 5.7 practising nurses (OECD average 9.2). The country had 5.7 hospital beds per 1,000 people, more than the OECD average of 4.3. Financial coverage, with 80% of spending covered by mandatory prepayment, was higher than the OECD average of 76%. Out-of-pocket spending was 19% of health expenditure, similar to the OECD average of 18%.

Contributions from the state budget are essential such as for state payments of hospitals' debt. The state has long given hospitals financial injections. In 2022, the state helped hospitals to the tune of 258 million euros. At the end of 2023, the social insurance company registered a debt of 415 million euros. In 2023 alone, the debt increased by 198 million.

== Organization and structure ==
The Slovak health system consists of public and private sectors. The public sector includes state hospitals, outpatient clinics and health centres, which are financed from the state budget and through compulsory health insurance. The facilities provide a wide range of health services from primary care to specialised hospital treatment.

There are 44 state hospitals. Currently, hospitals in Slovakia are categorised into five categories from highly skilled to standard and acute care in a city or region. The only hospital in the fifth category is the University Hospital in Bratislava, where the most demanding surgical procedures such as heart transplants are performed.

The need to build a new faculty hospital at the Razsochy site in Bratislava has long been discussed. However, construction has not yet started. There are also so-called partner hospitals, which complement the scope of the compulsory programmes of the main hospitals. In addition to the legislative requirements, the condition of the main and partner hospitals is their distance, which must be more than 15 minutes apart.

The private sector includes private medical clinics, hospitals and outpatient clinics, which are financed by fees for services. The facilities offer alternative treatment options and often specialise in particular areas of healthcare.

One of the most powerful private financial entities is the financial group Penta. It owns a network of hospitals, polyclinics, pharmacies and the health insurance company Dôvera. It is involved in several controversies associated. For example, there is a direct conflict of interest between the insurer and the provider, which distorts competition in the market. Another controversy is the alleged lobbying among politicians and violation of the law to provide free treatment in Penta's clinics.

== Personnel problems ==
At the beginning of 2023, the Fiscal Responsibility Council made a projection of the evolution of the number of medical staff.

The number of doctors was found to be gradually increasing, with the number of doctors going abroad dropping significantly a few years earlier. However, even that increase was not sufficient to maintain the current level of care for the aging population. To reach that level, the number of doctors would need to increase by 4% in the long term compared to current trends. That could be achieved by changing the policy of the medical faculty. The current situation was that medical faculties educated up to 40% of foreign students (announced plans were approaching 50%) at the expense of the needs of the Slovak health sector, which was contrary to the public interest. That opened up space for public policy to stimulate the necessary changes.

A more serious problem be is shortage of 'nursing' occupations, as the number of nurses will start to decline over the next few years because of the age structure and the shortage of young nurses, and the rate of decline will gradually accelerate over the next few years. Therefore, the biggest challenge for health care staffing policy is to significantly increase the retention of nurses (a diffierent methodology was used to define a nurse from OECD) in the department and to significantly increase the number of young people trained in those areas and to increase their motivation to enter the profession. Increasing their wages and making changes to facilitate work-life balance and improving their skills and access to education are key.

Closer cooperation between the different types of "nurses", such as in retirement homes, would help to promote the interests of nurses, as there is often competition between them today. It is important also to make full use of the education and skills of each type, especially for graduates of nursing schools (without subsequent university education), whose positions appear to be undervalued and inefficient for the system because of the length and the nature of their studies.

== Electronic health record ==
An electronic health record, administered by the National Healthcare Information Centre, was launched in 2018, when 92 hospitals were connected to the system. All outpatients' departments are required to participate. Online medical records are now linked to ID cards. Medication can be prescribed on line, and pharmacies can also access the records.

== See also ==
- Health in Slovakia
- List of hospitals in Slovakia
