= Stretavka =

Village and municipality in Slovakia

Stretavka Kisszeretva
- Municipality
- Flag

- Location of Stretavka in the Košice Region Location of Stretavka in Slovakia
- Coordinates: 48.62°N 21.98°E
- Country: Slovakia
- Region: Košice Region
- District: Michalovce District
- First mentioned: 1266

Area
  - Total: 4.86 km^{2} (1.88 sq mi)
- Elevation: 103 m (338 ft)

Population (2025)
  - Total: 157
- Time zone: UTC+1 (CET)
  - Summer (DST): UTC+2 (CEST)
- Postal code: 721 3
- Area code: +421 56
- Vehicle registration plate (until 2022): MI
- Website: obecstretavka.webnode.sk

Stretavka (Slovak pronunciation: [ˈstretawka]; Hungarian: Kisszeretva) is a small village and municipality in Michalovce District in the Kosice Region of eastern Slovakia.

== History ==
In historical records the village was first mentioned in 1266. Archaeological investigations in the municipal area have uncovered traces of settlements dating from the Bronze Age, as well as from the Hallstatt and La Tène periods.

== Geography ==
The municipality lies at an altitude of 103 metres (338 ft) and covers an area of 4.86 km^{2} (1.88 sq mi) (2025).

The neighbouring municipalities are Stretava to the north and northeast, Pavlovce nad Uhom to the east and south, Krišovská Liesková to the south, Drahňov to the southwest, and Budkovce to the west and northwest.

== Population ==
Population statistic (10 years)
Year	1995	2005	2015	2025
Count	205	180	188	157
Difference		−12.19%	+4.44%	−16.48%

Population statistic
Year	2024	2025
Count	157	157
Difference		+0%

It has a population of 157 people (31 December 2025).

=== Ethnicity ===
Census 2021 (1+ %)
Ethnicity	Number	Fraction
Slovak	142	91.02%
Not found out	8	5.12%
Polish	7	4.48%
Russian	2	1.28%
Total	156	

In year 2021 was 156 people by ethnicity 142 as Slovak, 8 as Not found out, 7 as Polish, 2 as Russian, 1 as Jewish, 1 as Czech, 1 as Ukrainian, 1 as Rusyn and 1 as Hungarian.

Note on population: The difference values of population numbers in the table "Population statistic" and in the sections "Ethnicity" & "Religion" is caused by the use of various statistical methods.

=== Religion ===
Census 2021 (1+ %)
Religion	Number	Fraction
Roman Catholic Church	61	39.1%
Greek Catholic Church	45	28.85%
None	18	11.54%
Not found out	12	7.69%
Jehovah's Witnesses	11	7.05%
Calvinist Church	7	4.49%
Eastern Orthodox Church	2	1.28%
Total	156	

In year 2021 was 156 people by religion 61 from Roman Catholic Church, 45 from Greek Catholic Church, 18 from None, 12 from Not found out, 11 from Jehovah's Witnesses, 7 from Calvinist Church and 2 from Eastern Orthodox Church.

== Gallery ==
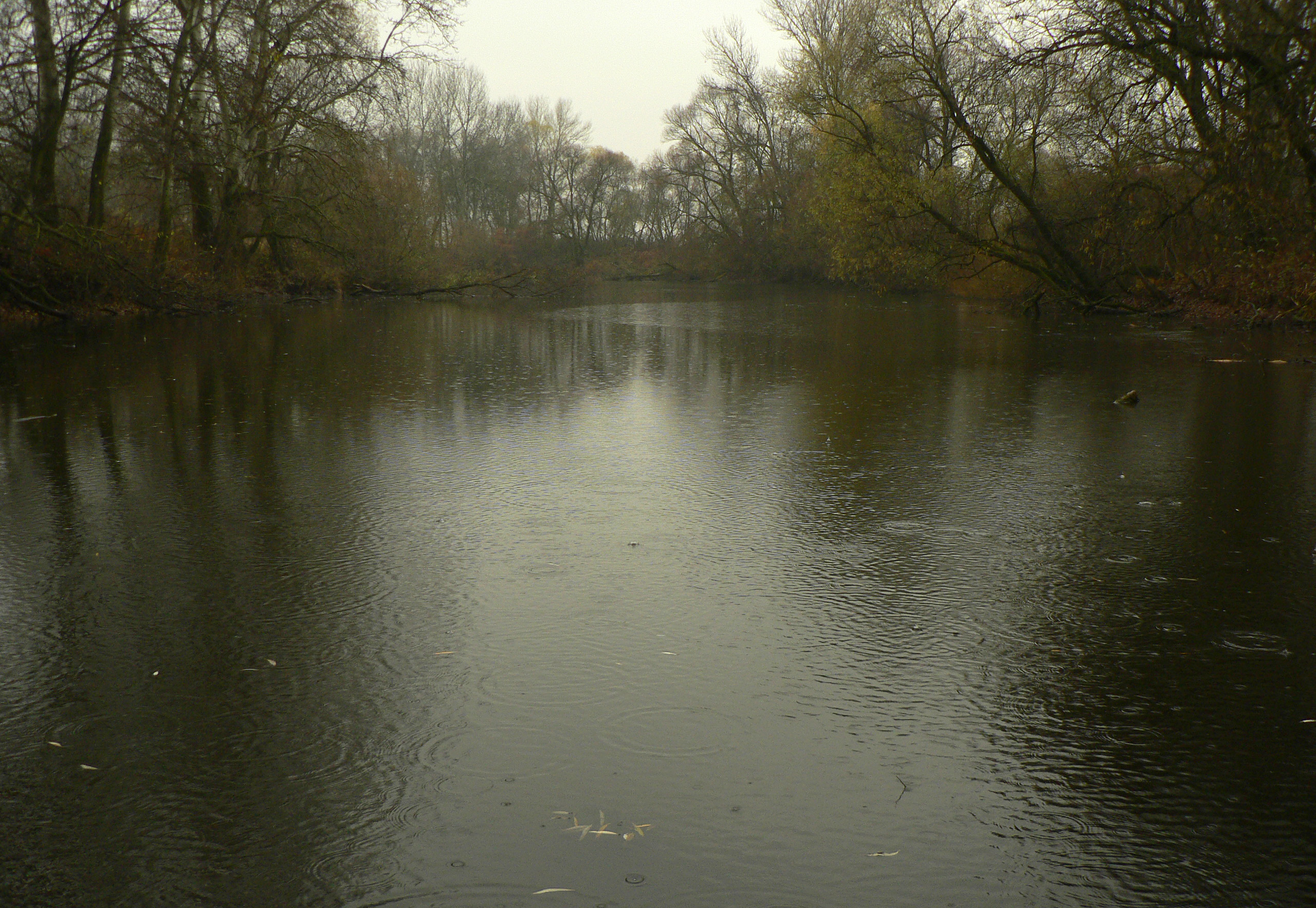
Local branch of the Uh (Uzh) river near Stretavka

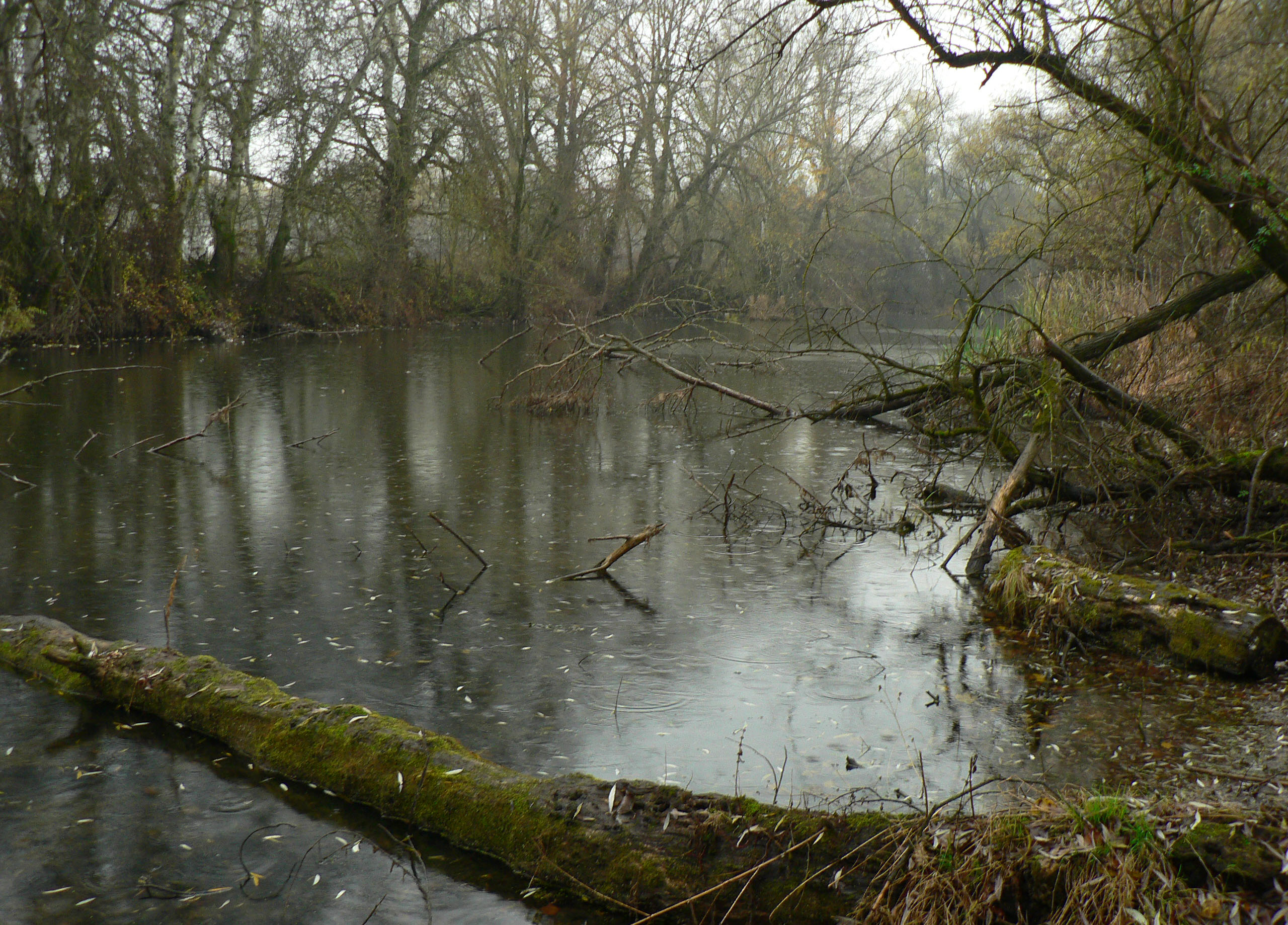
Local branch of the Uh (Uzh) river near Stretavka

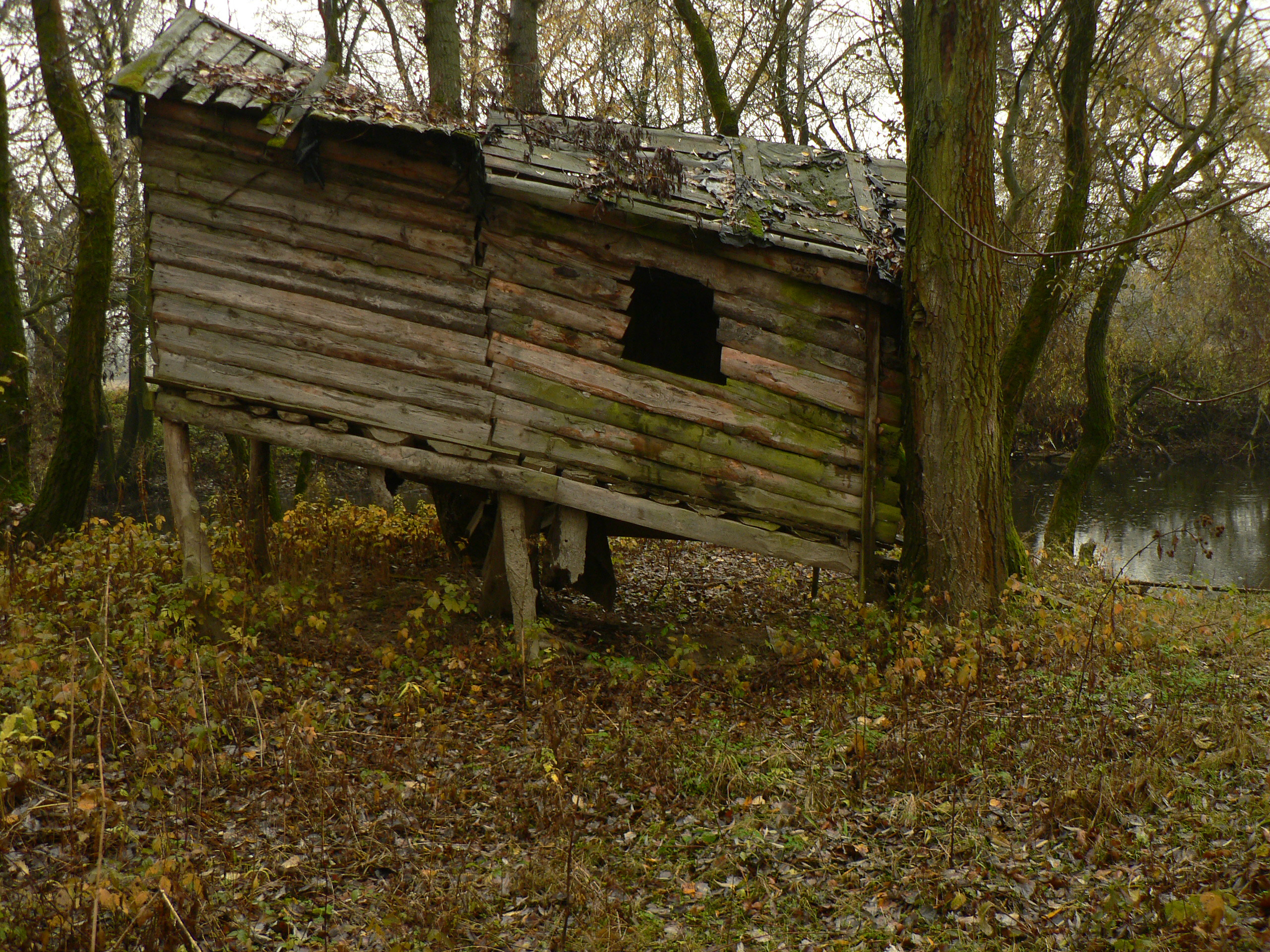
Cabin on stilts near the Uh river branch

== See also ==
- List of municipalities and towns in Michalovce District
- List of municipalities and towns in Slovakia
