= F.D. Roosevelt University Hospital with Policlinic Banská Bystrica =

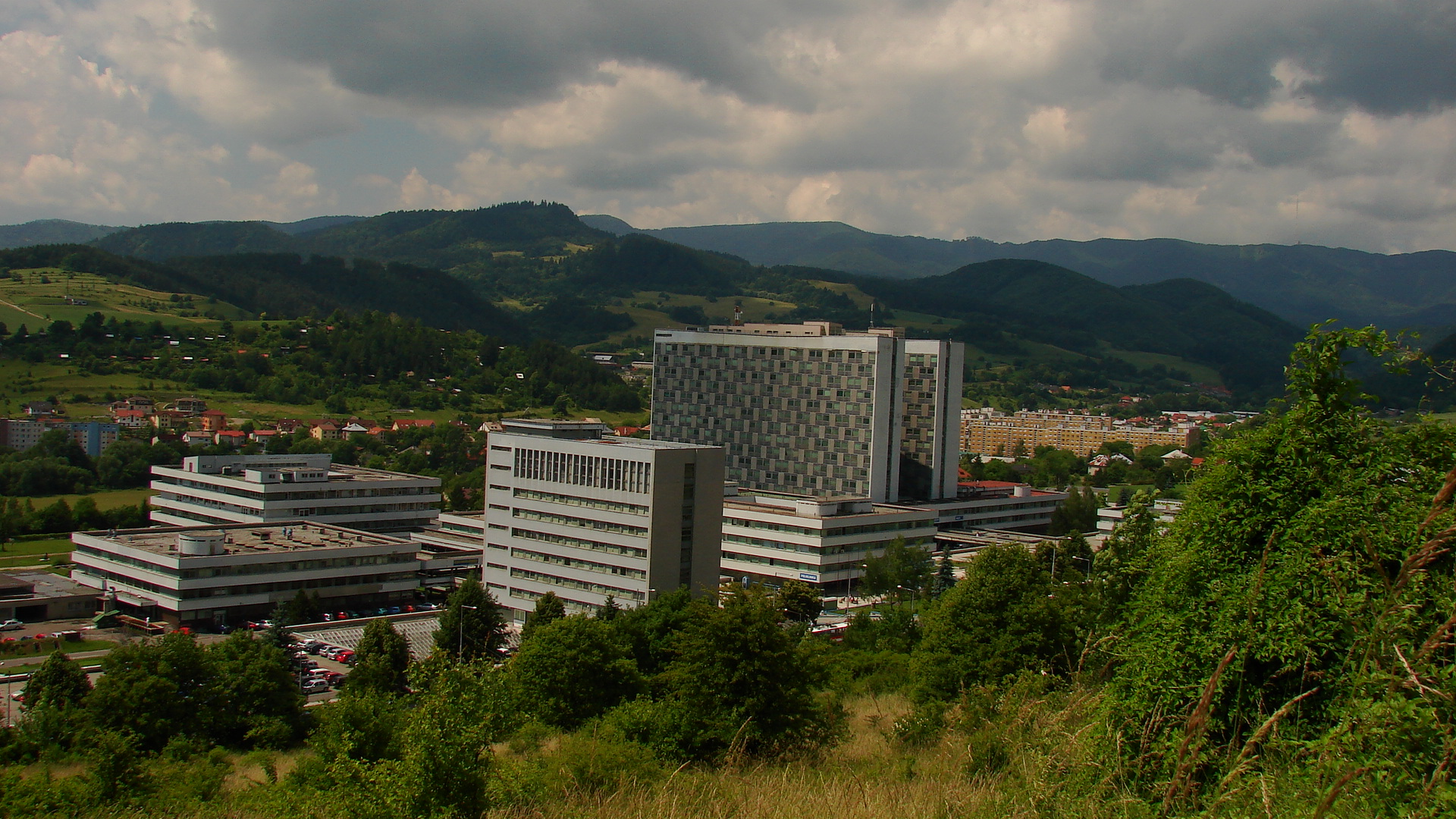
- F.D. Roosevelt University Hospital

Geography
- Location: Banská Bystrica, Slovakia
- Coordinates: 48.7434°N 19.1178°E

History
- Former name: City Hospital of Banská Bystrica
- Opened: 1900

Links
- Website: www.fnspfdr.sk/en/
- Lists: Hospitals in Slovakia

F.D. Roosevelt University Hospital with Policlinic Banská Bystrica (Slovak: Fakultná nemocnica s poliklinikou F. D. Roosevelta Banská Bystrica) is a major hospital serving the area of central Slovakia. It consists of 11 clinics.

== History ==
The hospital was founded in 1900 as City Hospital of Banská Bystrica. It had 125 beds and its first head physician was Ľudovít Rajčič, who is also considered the hospital's founder.

After World War II the hospital received its current name in honor of Franklin D. Roosevelt, who was the President of the United States during the war. The current premises with over 1,100 beds were built in 1968. In 2019, a rebuilding of the hospital was announced.

Among its notable patients is Slovak Prime Minister Robert Fico, who was treated in the hospital in a serious condition following an assassination attempt against him on 15 May 2024. He was discharged from the hospital on 30 May and was allowed to continue his recovery at home.
