= Pavol Horov Gymnasium =

Pavol Horov Grammar School
- Gymnázium Pavla Horova
- Gymnasiensis Paulensis Horovensis

Location
- Masarykova 1, 071 79; Michalovce; Slovakia

Information
- School type: Public secondary school
- Founded: 1922
- Principal: Katarína Olšavová
- Age range: 16–19/20
- Enrollment: 900
- Classes offered: General education
- Language: Slovak
- Campus: Urban
- Website: http://www.gphmi.sk/

Pavol Horov Grammar School (Slovak: Gymnázium Pavla Horova) is an upper secondary school located in the town of Michalovce in Košice Region, Slovakia. Established in 1922, it is the oldest Slovak Gymnasium east of the Mátra-Slanec Area and is one of two main providers of secondary school education in Michalovce, along with Gymnázium na ulici Ľudovíta Štúra.

== History ==
=== Background ===
Before the Czechoslovak declaration of independence on 28 October 1918, the area of surrounding the town of Michalovce was a part of the former Hungarian County of Košice (Hungarian: Kassa). At that time, there was only three secondary schools in the entire county, all of which was purely Hungarian, located in the then cultural centers of Košice, Prešov and Uzhhorod.

After becoming independent, patriotic sentiment ran high and Slovaks sensed immediately the need to establish a Slovak high school in the area, in order to provide higher education in Slovak for the populace in eastern Slovakia. At first the choice stood between three sites in the Zemplín region, which were the cities of Humenné, Trebišov and Michalovce. Due to its ability to provide sufficient funds and staffing, Michalovce soon became the obvious choice for the construction of the new school.

=== Inter-war period ===
The new school was finished in 1922 and in the period 1922 - 1938 the school bore the name "Czechoslovak state gymnasium." At the stage, the education was conducted in a way that emphasized the idea of the single Czechoslovak nation, and the language taught was the českoslovenčina, or Czechoslovak language. The school's administrators constantly struggled with finding teachers with sufficient qualifications, teaching post was often filled with engineers, and often the school was dependent on the assistance of local school teachers.

In 1931, the school marked its first graduating class, of the 22 students, 18 managed to graduate. Seven years later the school was markedly affected by the First Vienna Award, which saw the departure of all Czech professors along with their families from Michalovce. These were highly skilled academics which undoubtedly contributed to the high reputation of the school.

=== World War II ===
Following the Munich treaty in November 1938, the name of the school was changed to "Slovak real high school" (Slovak: Slovenské reálne gymnázium). In connection with the events of Munich, the beginning of the 1938-39 school year the school was occupied by the army (mobilization). Teaching was suspended from 24 September 1938 to 10 October 1938. After the First Vienna Award the new students came from schools from the Hungarian territories, (mainly Uzhhorod).

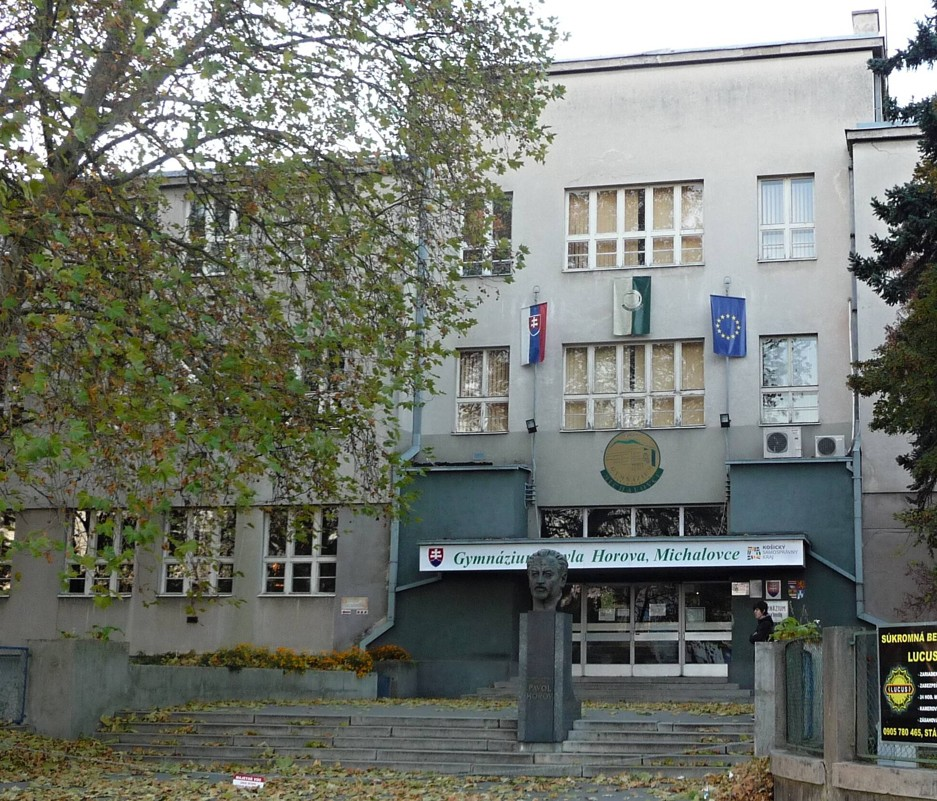
Pavol Horov Gymnasium

After Slovak students started moving to nearby Sobrance and the number of classes was reduced from 19 to 16 by April 1939, teaching in at the school year was interrupted again. When Hungarian troops invaded Slovakia on March 23, 1939 and the subsequent Slovak–Hungarian War, Slovak troops occupied the school and returned Slovak to the curriculum. This education highlighted growing Slovak national consciousness and nationalism. At this time the Head teacher was also the government commissioner of Michalovce and later the leader of the Hlinka Youth (Slovak paramilitary scout movement, modeled after the Hitler Youth). In school year 1939/40 that organization counted 118 of the schools students. Two years later the count was 590 boys and girls. In 1944 it was 694 students out of a total 875. Influenced in part by the ideas of Slovak nationalist Andrej Hlinka, Catholicism became an important part of the school year, the year began with worship of Veni Sancte Spiritus, a school celebration, ending a solemn Te Deum. During the closing phase of World War II, the school became a military hospital for the Wehrmacht, and after November 1944, for the Red Army.

== Education ==
The school education programme consists of 8 semesters (4 years), divided into two parts of two years each. Each part includes subjects such as general education, foreign languages (usually Russian, French, German and English), physical education, informatics and science/technology.

== Notable alumni ==
- Marián Čalfa, Prime Minister of Czechoslovakia and acting President
- Jozef Tomko, Roman Catholic Cardinal
- Andrej Daňko, footballer
- Misha, singer
- Kristián Kudroč, ice hockey player
