= Senné, Michalovce District =

Senné Ungszenna
- Municipality
- Flag

- Location of Senné in the Košice Region Location of Senné in Slovakia
- Coordinates: 48.67°N 22.03°E
- Country: Slovakia
- Region: Košice Region
- District: Michalovce District
- First mentioned: 1263

Area
  - Total: 18.75 km^{2} (7.24 sq mi)
- Elevation: 100 m (330 ft)

Population (2025)
  - Total: 720
- Time zone: UTC+1 (CET)
  - Summer (DST): UTC+2 (CEST)
- Postal code: 721 3
- Area code: +421 56
- Vehicle registration plate (until 2022): MI
- Website: www.obecsenne.sk

Senné (Hungarian: Ungszenna) is a village and municipality in Michalovce District in the Košice Region of eastern Slovakia.

== History ==
In historical records the village was first mentioned in 1263.

== Geography ==
The municipality lies at an altitude of 100 metres (330 ft) and covers an area of 18.75 km^{2} (7.24 sq mi) (2025).

== Population ==
Population statistic (10 years)
Year	1995	2005	2015	2025
Count	705	751	715	720
Difference		+6.52%	−4.79%	+0.69%

Population statistic
Year	2024	2025
Count	731	720
Difference		−1.50%

It has a population of 720 people (31 December 2025).

=== Ethnicity ===
Census 2021 (1+ %)
Ethnicity	Number	Fraction
Slovak	690	93.62%
Romani	45	6.1%
Not found out	32	4.34%
Total	737	

In year 2021 was 737 people by ethnicity 690 as Slovak, 45 as Romani, 32 as Not found out, 7 as Czech, 3 as Other and 1 as Rusyn.

Note on population: The difference values of population numbers in the table "Population statistic" and in the sections "Ethnicity" & "Religion" is caused by the use of various statistical methods.

=== Religion ===
Census 2021 (1+ %)
Religion	Number	Fraction
Roman Catholic Church	548	74.36%
None	51	6.92%
Greek Catholic Church	40	5.43%
Not found out	29	3.93%
Apostolic Church	22	2.99%
Christian Congregations in Slovakia	14	1.9%
Calvinist Church	10	1.36%
Evangelical Church	9	1.22%
Total	737	

In year 2021 was 737 people by religion 548 from Roman Catholic Church, 51 from None, 40 from Greek Catholic Church, 29 from Not found out, 22 from Apostolic Church, 14 from Christian Congregations in Slovakia, 10 from Calvinist Church, 9 from Evangelical Church, 5 from Jehovah's Witnesses, 3 from Eastern Orthodox Church, 3 from Other and not ascertained christian church, 2 from Old Catholic Church and 1 from Other.

== Transport ==
The nearest railway station is at Michalovce 17 kilometres away.

== See also ==
- List of municipalities and towns in Michalovce District
- List of municipalities and towns in Slovakia
