= Treaty of Weissenburg =

1551 treaty

The Treaty of Weissenburg (German: Vertrag von Weißenburg or Weißenburger Vertrag) declared Archduke Ferdinand of Austria the ruler of Royal Hungary and Transylvania. The territory had previously been ruled by John Zápolya's widow, Isabella Jagiełło. The treaty was signed in Weissenburg (later Gyulafehérvár) on 19 July 1551 by representatives of King John Sigismund Zápolya, Isabella Jagiellon of Transylvania and Ferdinand, King of the Romans.

== See also ==
- List of treaties
