= Štefan Kukura Hospital in Michalovce =

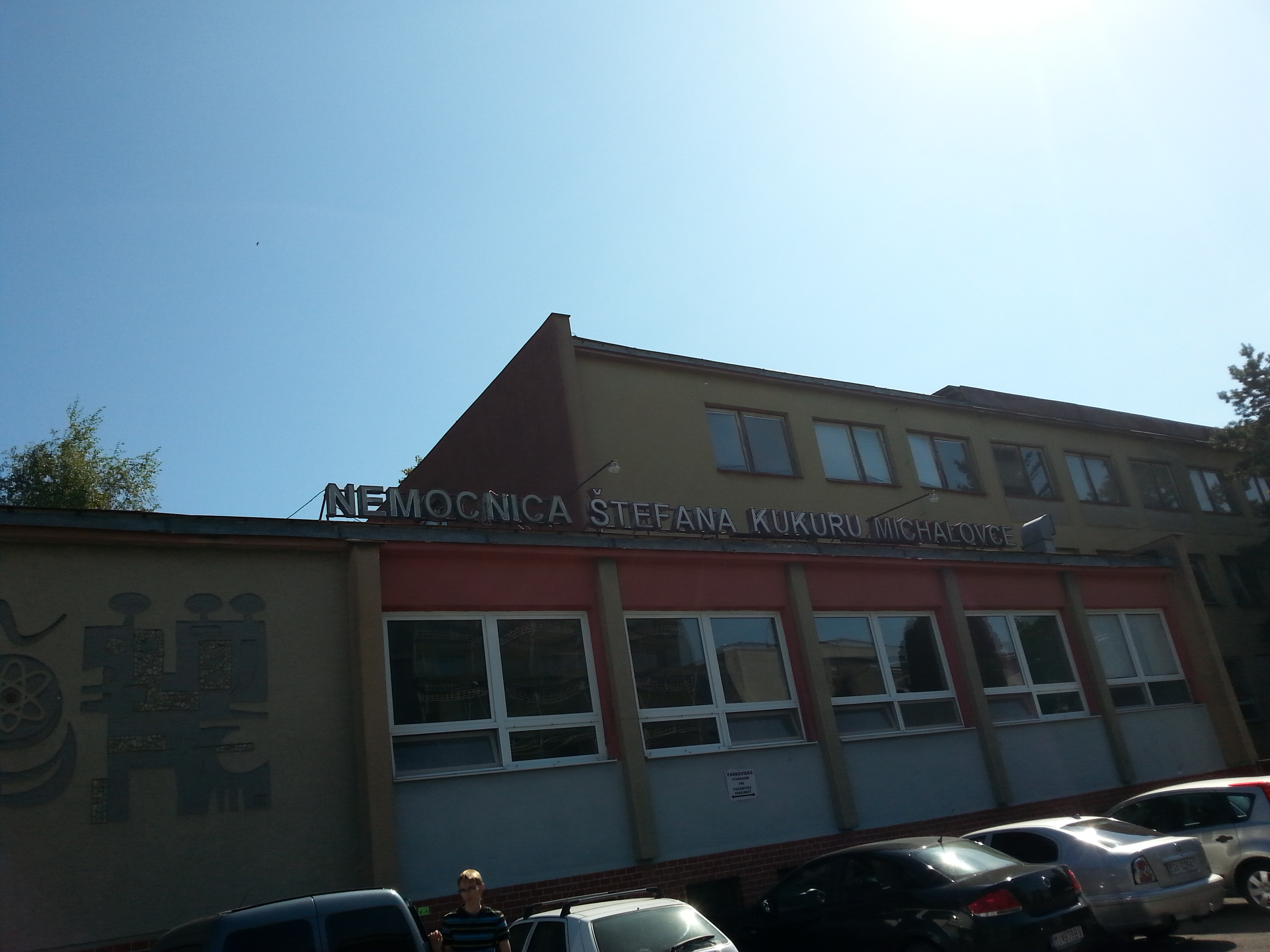
- Stefan Kukura Hospital

Geography
- Location: Špitálska ul.č.2, Michalovce, Slovakia
- Coordinates: 48.752885°N 21.915729°E

Organisation
- Care system: Public

Services
- Beds: 712

History
- Founded: 1863

Links
- Website: https://pentahospitals.sk/nemocnica/nemocnica-s-poliklinikou-stefana-kukuru-michalovce-s/
- Lists: Hospitals in Slovakia

The Štefan Kukura Hospital and Polyclinic in Michalovce (Slovak: Nemocnica s poliklinikou Štefana Kukuru, abbreviated to NsP-SKM) is a Slovak private hospital located in the Michalovce municipality, in the Kosice Region, in the far east, close to the border with Ukraine. The current director of the hospital is Ing.Marián Haviernik. The hospital is operated by PentaHospitals SK.

== History ==
The predecessor of the Michalovce hospital was established in 1773 by Anton Count Sztáray de Nagy-Mihaly. In 1863 he established the foundation for the establishment of new Hospital. The foundation created a commission to address the practical issues of new training hospital. In 1875, these conditions were created, including cash resources to establish the groundwork of the hospital and request approval for the creation of the hospital. The Michalovce Hospital with twenty beds was opened on 1 January 1876. In 1890 it was put into operation with another pavilion with 16 beds.

In 1900 the hospital was renamed the General Public County Hospital. In 1902 the third pavilion was constructed. In 1911, the hospital had 120 beds and part of the surgical, internal medicine and infectious departments. In 1947 it was established children's department with 50 beds and a year later urology department with 45 beds. Ophthalmology department was opened in 1951. Until 1953 the hospital had already 9 separate departments, 509 beds and 29 doctors. Since 1956, the hospital began to implement the polyclinic system and a network of regional and district health facilities. In 1975 it had 712 hospital beds. On 13.9.1996 the hospital was renamed Štefan Kukura Hospital in Michalovce.

== Specialties ==
- Internal medicine with sub-specialties,
- Neurology,
- Pediatrics,
- Physiotherapy.
- Surgery with sub-specialties,
- Orthopedics,
- Otorhinolaryngology,
- Anesthesia,
- Obstetrics and gynecology,
- Dermatology,
- Pneumology,
- Oncology and Radiotherapy,
- Clinical Chemistry and Nuclear Medicine,
- Immunology and Transfusion Medicine,
- Microbiology,
- Pathological anatomy,
- Radiology,
- Urology
- Adult and Children Psychiatry,
- Geriatric,
- Neonatology and Perinatology.

== Directors ==
- Peter Rovder (2013)

== See also ==
- Michalovce
- Kosice Region
- List of hospitals in Slovakia
