= Bežovce =

Village and municipality in Slovakia

Bežovce Bező
- Municipality
- Flag

- Location of Bežovce in the Košice Region Location of Bežovce in Slovakia
- Coordinates: 48.63°N 22.15°E
- Country: Slovakia
- Region: Košice Region
- District: Sobrance District
- First mentioned: 1214

Area
  - Total: 29.52 km^{2} (11.40 sq mi)
- Elevation: 105 m (344 ft)

Population (2025)
  - Total: 995
- Time zone: UTC+1 (CET)
  - Summer (DST): UTC+2 (CEST)
- Postal code: 725 3
- Area code: +421 56
- Vehicle registration plate (until 2022): SO
- Website: www.bezovce.sk

Bežovce (Hungarian: Bező, Rusyn: Бежівцї) is a village and municipality in the Sobrance District in the Košice Region of east Slovakia.

== History ==
In historical records the village was first mentioned in 1214. Before the establishment of independent Czechoslovakia in 1918, Bežovce was part of Ung County within the Kingdom of Hungary. In 1939, it was for a short time part of the Slovak Republic. As a result of the Slovak–Hungarian War of 1939, it was again part of Hungary from 1939 to 1944. On 28 October 1944, the Red Army entered Bežovce and it was once again part of Czechoslovakia.

== Geography ==
The municipality lies at an altitude of 105 metres (344 ft) and covers an area of 29.52 km^{2} (11.40 sq mi) (2025).

== Population ==
Population statistic (10 years)
Year	1995	2005	2015	2025
Count	1120	996	1002	995
Difference		−11.07%	+0.60%	−0.69%

Population statistic
Year	2024	2025
Count	1017	995
Difference		−2.16%

It has a population of 995 people (31 December 2025).

=== Ethnicity ===
Census 2021 (1+ %)
Ethnicity	Number	Fraction
Slovak	954	98.35%
Romani	48	4.94%
Not found out	11	1.13%
Total	970	

In year 2021 was 970 people by ethnicity 954 as Slovak, 48 as Romani, 11 as Not found out, 5 as Ukrainian, 2 as Czech, 2 as Rusyn, 2 as German, 2 as Hungarian and 1 as Greek.

Note on population: The difference values of population numbers in the table "Population statistic" and in the sections "Ethnicity" & "Religion" is caused by the use of various statistical methods.

=== Religion ===
Census 2021 (1+ %)
Religion	Number	Fraction
Roman Catholic Church	280	28.87%
Calvinist Church	215	22.16%
None	179	18.45%
Greek Catholic Church	114	11.75%
Eastern Orthodox Church	74	7.63%
Apostolic Church	45	4.64%
Jehovah's Witnesses	32	3.3%
Evangelical Church	16	1.65%
Total	970	

In year 2021 was 970 people by religion 280 from Roman Catholic Church, 215 from Calvinist Church, 179 from None, 114 from Greek Catholic Church, 74 from Eastern Orthodox Church, 45 from Apostolic Church, 32 from Jehovah's Witnesses, 16 from Evangelical Church, 8 from Christian Congregations in Slovakia, 6 from Not found out and 1 from Ad hoc movements.

== Culture ==
The village has a public library, a gymnasium and a football pitch

== Genealogical resources ==
The records for genealogical research are available at the state archive "Statny Archiv in Presov, Slovakia"

- Roman Catholic church records (births/marriages/deaths): 1789–1899 (parish B)
- Greek Catholic church records (births/marriages/deaths): 1789–1916 (parish A)
- Reformated church records (births/marriages/deaths): 1844–1906 (parish A)

== See also ==
- List of municipalities and towns in Slovakia
