= Pavlovce, Rimavská Sobota District =

Pavlovce Rimapálfala
- Municipality
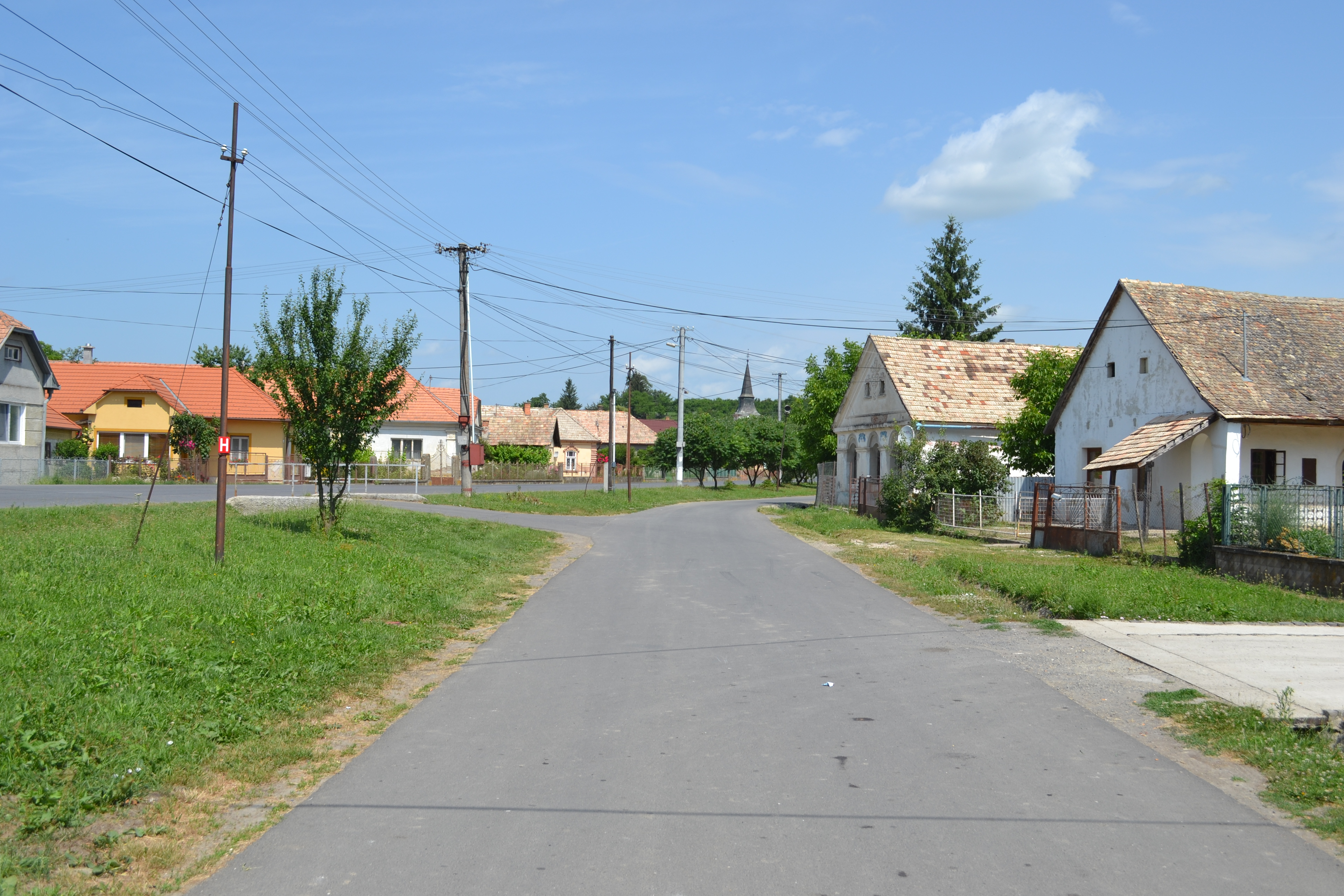

- Flag

- Location of Pavlovce in the Banská Bystrica Region Location of Pavlovce in Slovakia
- Coordinates: 48°19′40″N 20°05′00″E
- Country: Slovakia
- Region: Banská Bystrica Region
- District: Rimavská Sobota District
- First mentioned: 1431

Area
  - Total: 7.07 km^{2} (2.73 sq mi)
- Elevation: 188 m (617 ft)

Population (2025)
  - Total: 429
- Time zone: UTC+1 (CET)
  - Summer (DST): UTC+2 (CEST)
- Postal code: 980 01
- Area code: +421 47
- Vehicle registration plate (until 2022): RS

Pavlovce (Hungarian: Rimapálfala) is a village and municipality in the Rimavská Sobota District of the Banská Bystrica Region of southern Slovakia.

== Population ==
Population statistic (10 years)
Year	1995	2005	2015	2025
Count	308	344	395	429
Difference		+11.68%	+14.82%	+8.60%

Population statistic
Year	2024	2025
Count	422	429
Difference		+1.65%

It has a population of 429 people (31 December 2025).

=== Ethnicity ===
Census 2021 (1+ %)
Ethnicity	Number	Fraction
Hungarian	351	86.45%
Slovak	49	12.06%
Romani	26	6.4%
Not found out	15	3.69%
Total	406	

In year 2021 was 406 people by ethnicity 351 as Hungarian, 49 as Slovak, 26 as Romani, 15 as Not found out and 1 as Czech.

Note on population: The difference values of population numbers in the table "Population statistic" and in the sections "Ethnicity" & "Religion" is caused by the use of various statistical methods.

=== Religion ===
Census 2021 (1+ %)
Religion	Number	Fraction
Roman Catholic Church	292	71.92%
None	38	9.36%
Greek Catholic Church	31	7.64%
Calvinist Church	25	6.16%
Not found out	10	2.46%
Christian Congregations in Slovakia	5	1.23%
Total	406	

In year 2021 was 406 people by religion 292 from Roman Catholic Church, 38 from None, 31 from Greek Catholic Church, 25 from Calvinist Church, 10 from Not found out, 5 from Christian Congregations in Slovakia, 4 from Other and not ascertained christian church and 1 from Jehovah's Witnesses.
