= Interklinik Bratislava =

Interklinik Bratislava is a clinic based in the capital of the Slovak Republic, Bratislava. Established in 1995, it consists of over 1,000 square meters of operating rooms, ambulances, inpatient rooms and spa.

== Default ==
Interklinik consists of a number of interconnected companies, several ones of which are in default- their net equity is negative. The Interklinik companies in default as of June 2018 are: INTERKLINIK SPA s.r.o. and INTERKLINIK VITAL s.r.o.

== History ==
Interklinik was established in 1994 as a clinic specialising in several areas of surgery. Under the auspices of its new director Tomas Stern, M.D. it later moved to the city-center of Bratislava and increased its scope of specialisations, including stomatology and medical spa treatments. The company offering spa treatments- Interklinik SPA s.r.o., is currently in default.

Mr. Tomas Stern is currently the sole director of INTERKLINIK VITAL s.r.o. and one o the directors of INTERKLINIK SPA s.r.o.

Today the clinic is situated at Einsteinova street in the Petržalka district.
