= Pavlovce (Vranov nad Topľou District) =

- Municipality
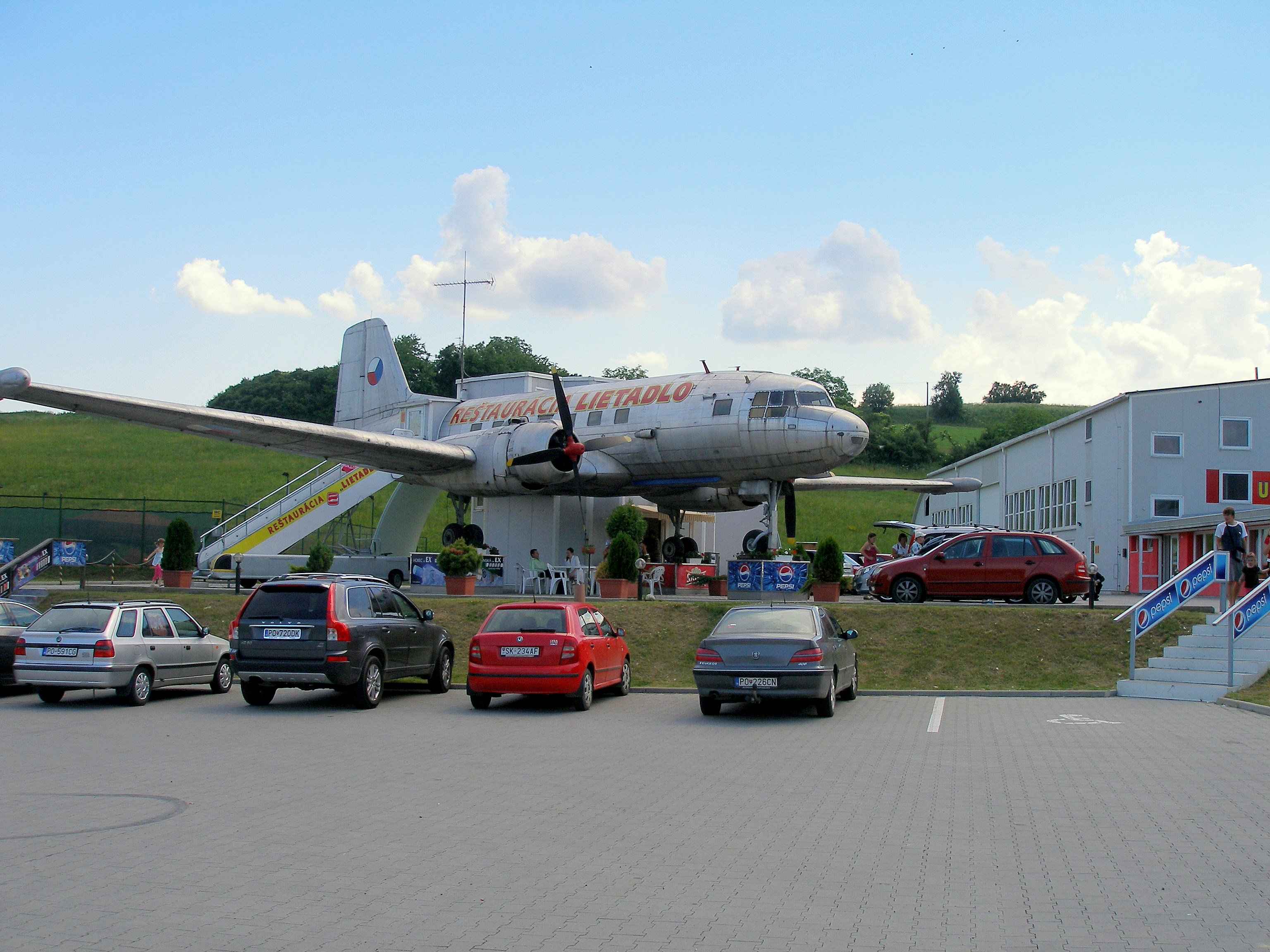

- Flag

- Location of Pavlovce in the Prešov Region Location of Pavlovce in Slovakia
- Coordinates: 49°01′30″N 21°26′22″E
- Country: Slovakia
- Region: Prešov Region
- District: Vranov nad Topľou District
- First mentioned: 1359

Area
  - Total: 17.57 km^{2} (6.78 sq mi)
- Elevation: 266 m (873 ft)

Population (2025)
  - Total: 844
- Time zone: UTC+1 (CET)
  - Summer (DST): UTC+2 (CEST)
- Postal code: 943 1
- Area code: +421 57
- Vehicle registration plate (until 2022): VT
- Website: www.obecpavlovce.sk

Pavlovce (Hungarian: Kapipálvágása) is a village and municipality in Vranov nad Topľou District in the Prešov Region of eastern Slovakia.

== History ==
In historical records the village was first mentioned in 1359.

== Geography ==
The municipality lies at an altitude of 266 metres (873 ft) and covers an area of 17.57 km^{2} (6.78 sq mi) (2025).

== Population ==
Population statistic (10 years)
Year	1995	2005	2015	2025
Count	633	732	780	844
Difference		+15.63%	+6.55%	+8.20%

Population statistic
Year	2024	2025
Count	836	844
Difference		+0.95%

It has a population of 844 people (31 December 2025).

=== Ethnicity ===
Census 2021 (1+ %)
Ethnicity	Number	Fraction
Slovak	757	94.98%
Not found out	29	3.63%
Romani	23	2.88%
Total	797	

In year 2021 was 797 people by ethnicity 757 as Slovak, 29 as Not found out, 23 as Romani, 2 as Rusyn, 1 as Hungarian, 1 as Other, 1 as Bulgarian and 1 as English.

Note on population: The difference values of population numbers in the table "Population statistic" and in the sections "Ethnicity" & "Religion" is caused by the use of various statistical methods.

=== Religion ===
Census 2021 (1+ %)
Religion	Number	Fraction
Roman Catholic Church	483	60.6%
Evangelical Church	222	27.85%
Not found out	30	3.76%
None	27	3.39%
Greek Catholic Church	25	3.14%
Total	797	

In year 2021 was 797 people by religion 483 from Roman Catholic Church, 222 from Evangelical Church, 30 from Not found out, 27 from None, 25 from Greek Catholic Church, 3 from Jehovah's Witnesses, 3 from Ad hoc movements, 2 from Christian Congregations in Slovakia, 1 from Paganism and natural spirituality and 1 from Other and not ascertained christian church.

== Government ==
The village relies on the tax and district offices, and fire brigade at Michalovce and relies on the police force and birth registry at Trhovište.

== Transport ==
The village has a railway station.
