= List of hospitals in Slovakia =

List of hospitals in Slovakia is listing the hospitals and important clinics in the Slovak Republic.

- Bratislava Region (Bratislavský kraj)
  - University Hospital with Polyclinic Bratislava
  - Interklinik Bratislava
  - St. Michael Hospital, a.s. Bratislava
  - National Institute of Heart and Cardiovascular Diseases Bratislava
  - National Institute of Oncology
  - Children's University Hospital with Policlinic Bratislava
  - Philipp Pinel Psychiatric Hospital, Pezinok
- Trnava Region (Trnavský kraj)
- Trenčin Region (Trenčiansky kraj)
  - University Hospital Trencin
  - Hospital with Polyclinic Povazska Bystrica
- Nitra Region (Nitrianský kraj)
  - Hospital with Polyclinic Levice
  - University Hospital Nitra
  - R. Korec City Hospital Zlate Moravce
- Žilina Region (Žilinský kraj)
  - Martin University Hospital
  - Medcentrum Zilina
  - Liptov Hospital with Policlinic Liptovsky Mikulas
- Banska Bystrica Region (Banskobystricky kraj)
  - F.D. Roosevelt University Hospital with Policlinic Banská Bystrica
- Prešov Region (Prešovský kraj)
  - Hospital Poprad, a.s.
  - Hospital with polyclinic Vranov nad Toplou
  - Jan Adam Reiman University Hospital with Polyclinic Presov
- Košice Region (Košický kraj)
  - Štefan Kukura Hospital in Michalovce
  - Louis Pasteur University Hospital with Polyclinic in Kosice
  - Hospital with Policlinic Trebisov, a.s.
  - Airforce Military Hospital, a.s. Kosice
  - Hospital Kosice-Saca
