= Iňačovce =

Village and municipality in Slovakia

Iňačovce Solymos
- Municipality
- Flag

- Location of Iňačovce in the Košice Region Location of Iňačovce in Slovakia
- Coordinates: 48.70°N 22.03°E
- Country: Slovakia
- Region: Košice Region
- District: Michalovce District
- First mentioned: 1417

Area
  - Total: 17.34 km^{2} (6.70 sq mi)
- Elevation: 103 m (338 ft)

Population (2025)
  - Total: 922
- Time zone: UTC+1 (CET)
  - Summer (DST): UTC+2 (CEST)
- Postal code: 721 1
- Area code: +421 56
- Vehicle registration plate (until 2022): MI
- Website: www.obecinacovce.sk

Iňačovce (Hungarian: Solymos) is a village and municipality in Michalovce District in the Kosice Region of eastern Slovakia.

== History ==
In historical records the village was first mentioned in 1417. Before the establishment of independent Czechoslovakia in 1918, it was part of Ung County within the Kingdom of Hungary.

== Geography ==
The municipality lies at an altitude of 103 metres (338 ft) and covers an area of 17.34 km^{2} (6.70 sq mi) (2025).

== Population ==
Population statistic (10 years)
Year	1995	2005	2015	2025
Count	569	626	764	922
Difference		+10.01%	+22.04%	+20.68%

Population statistic
Year	2024	2025
Count	909	922
Difference		+1.43%

It has a population of 922 people (31 December 2025).

=== Ethnicity ===
Census 2021 (1+%)
Ethnicity	Number	Fraction
Slovak	791	95.87%
Romani	175	21.21%
Not found out	26	3.15%
Total	825	

In year 2021 was 825 people by ethnicity 791 as Slovak, 175 as Romani, 26 as Not found out, 5 as Rusyn, 2 as Czech, 2 as Polish, 2 as Hungarian, 1 as Russian and 1 as Austrian.

Note on population: The difference values of population numbers in the table "Population statistic" and in the sections "Ethnicity" & "Religion" is caused by the use of various statistical methods.

=== Religion ===
Census 2021 (1+%)
Religion	Number	Fraction
Greek Catholic Church	314	38.06%
None	233	28.24%
Roman Catholic Church	113	13.7%
Jehovah's Witnesses	38	4.61%
Calvinist Church	25	3.03%
Apostolic Church	25	3.03%
Not found out	22	2.67%
Church of the Brethren	21	2.55%
Evangelical Church	14	1.7%
Eastern Orthodox Church	12	1.45%
Total	825	

In year 2021 was 825 people by religion 314 from Greek Catholic Church, 233 from None, 113 from Roman Catholic Church, 38 from Jehovah's Witnesses, 25 from Calvinist Church, 25 from Apostolic Church, 22 from Not found out, 21 from Church of the Brethren, 14 from Evangelical Church, 12 from Eastern Orthodox Church, 4 from Christian Congregations in Slovakia, 2 from Church of Jesus Christ of Latter-day Saints, 1 from United Methodist Church and 1 from Ad hoc movements.

== Genealogical resources ==
The records for genealogical research are available at the state archive "Statny Archiv in Presov, Slovakia"

- Roman Catholic church records (births/marriages/deaths): 1863-1926 (parish B)
- Greek Catholic church records (births/marriages/deaths): 1811-1898 (parish A)
- Reformated church records (births/marriages/deaths): 1747-1940 (parish B)

== See also ==
- List of municipalities and towns in Slovakia
