= Michalovce =

Town in Košice Region, Slovakia

- Town
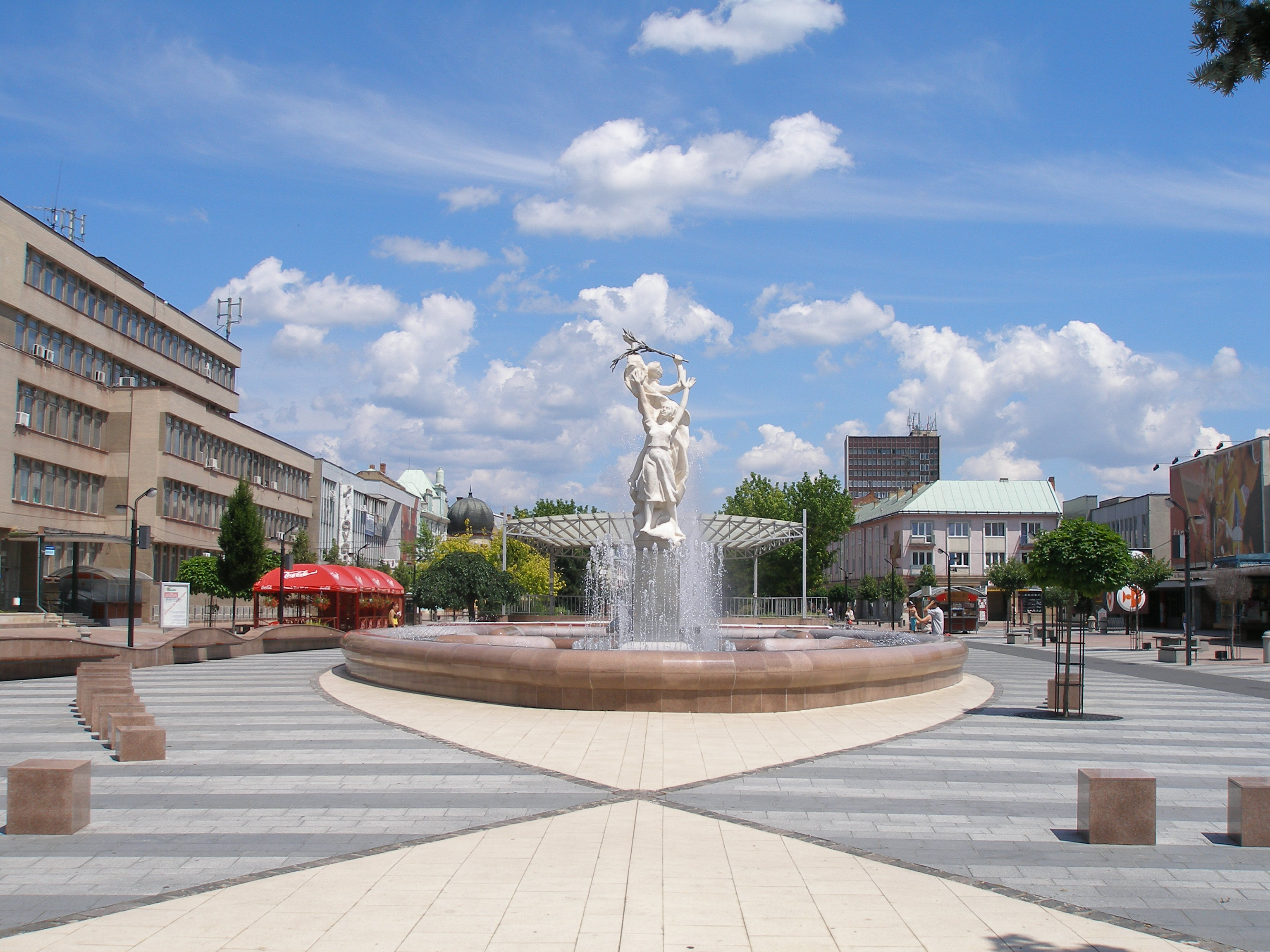
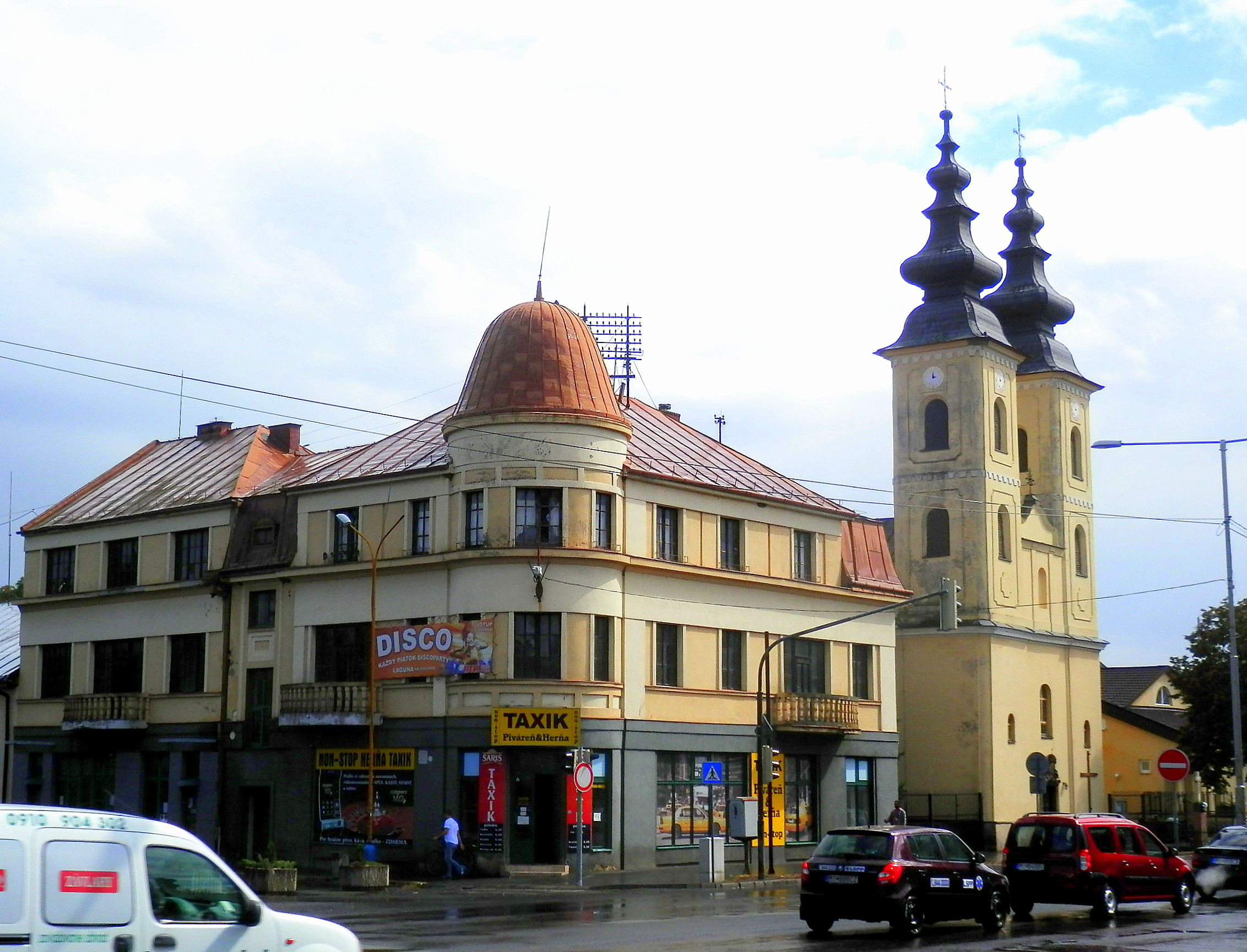
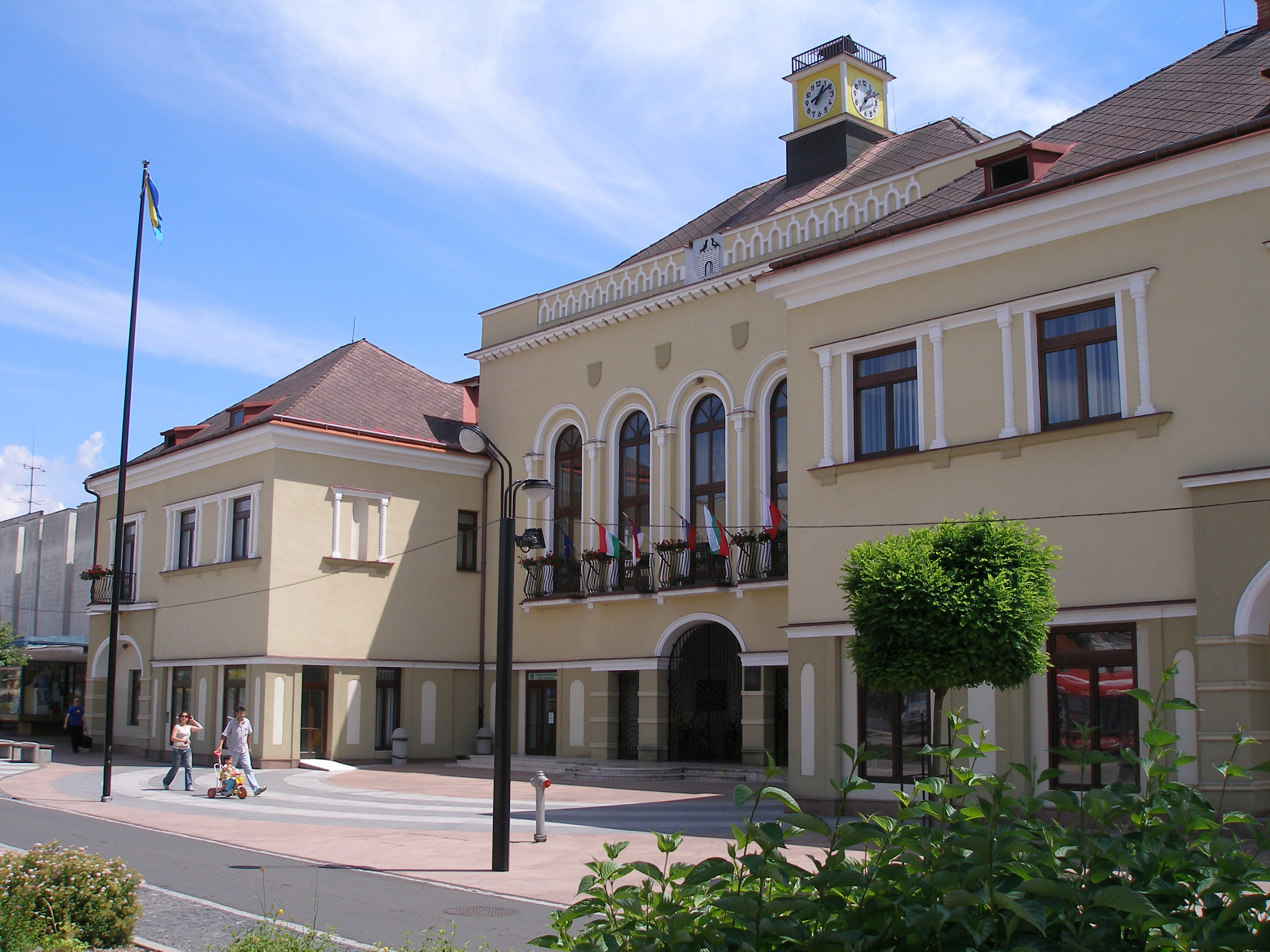
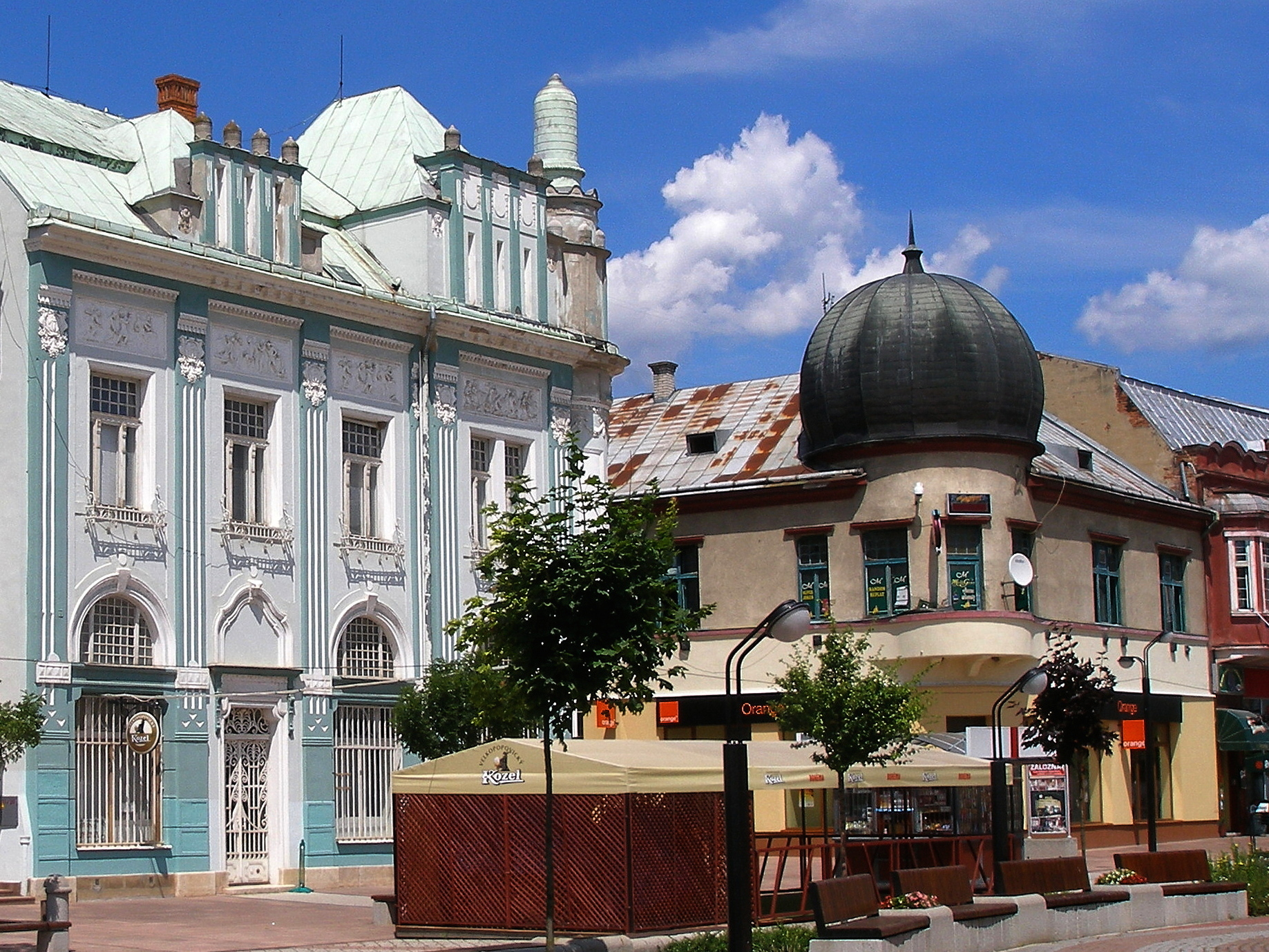
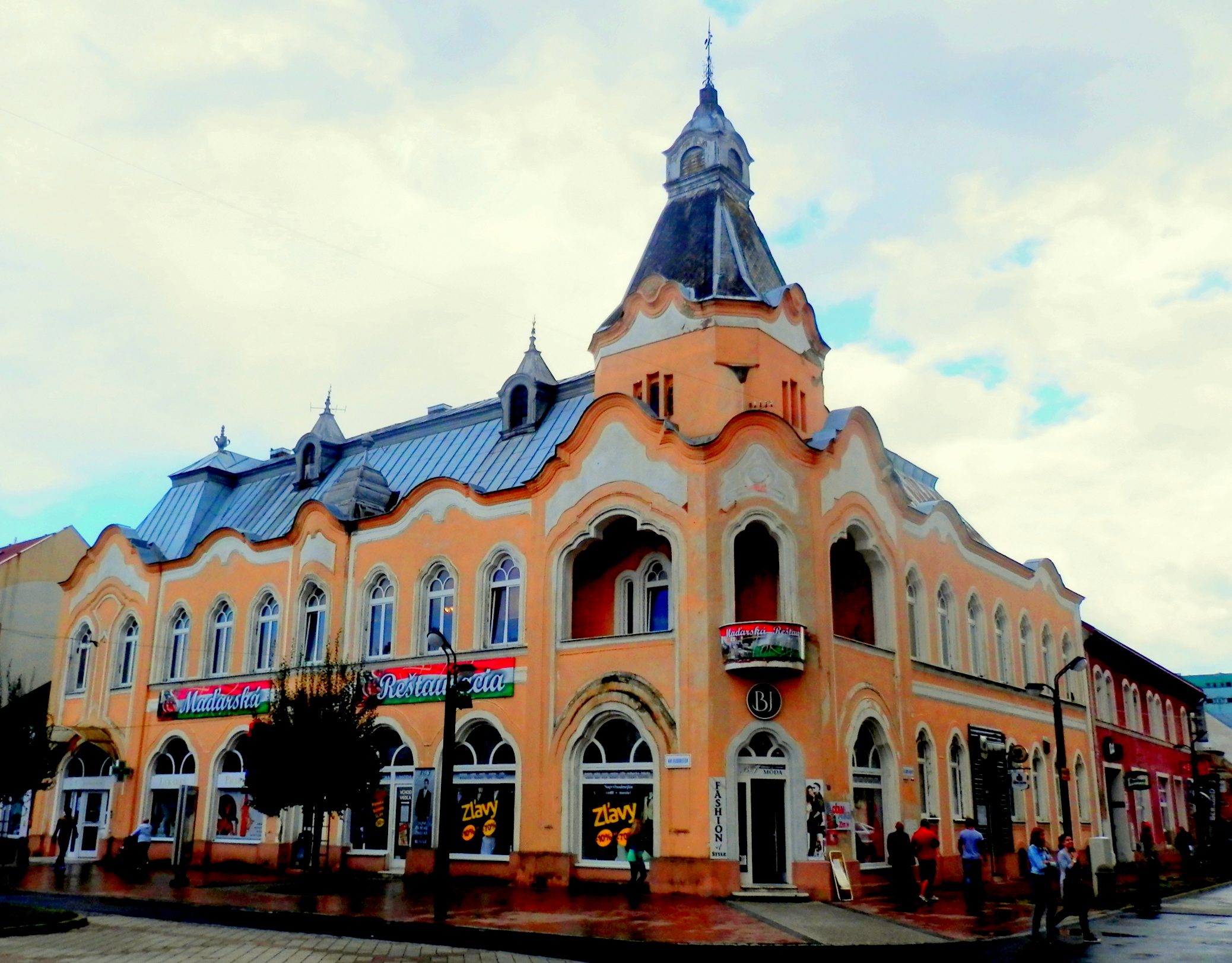
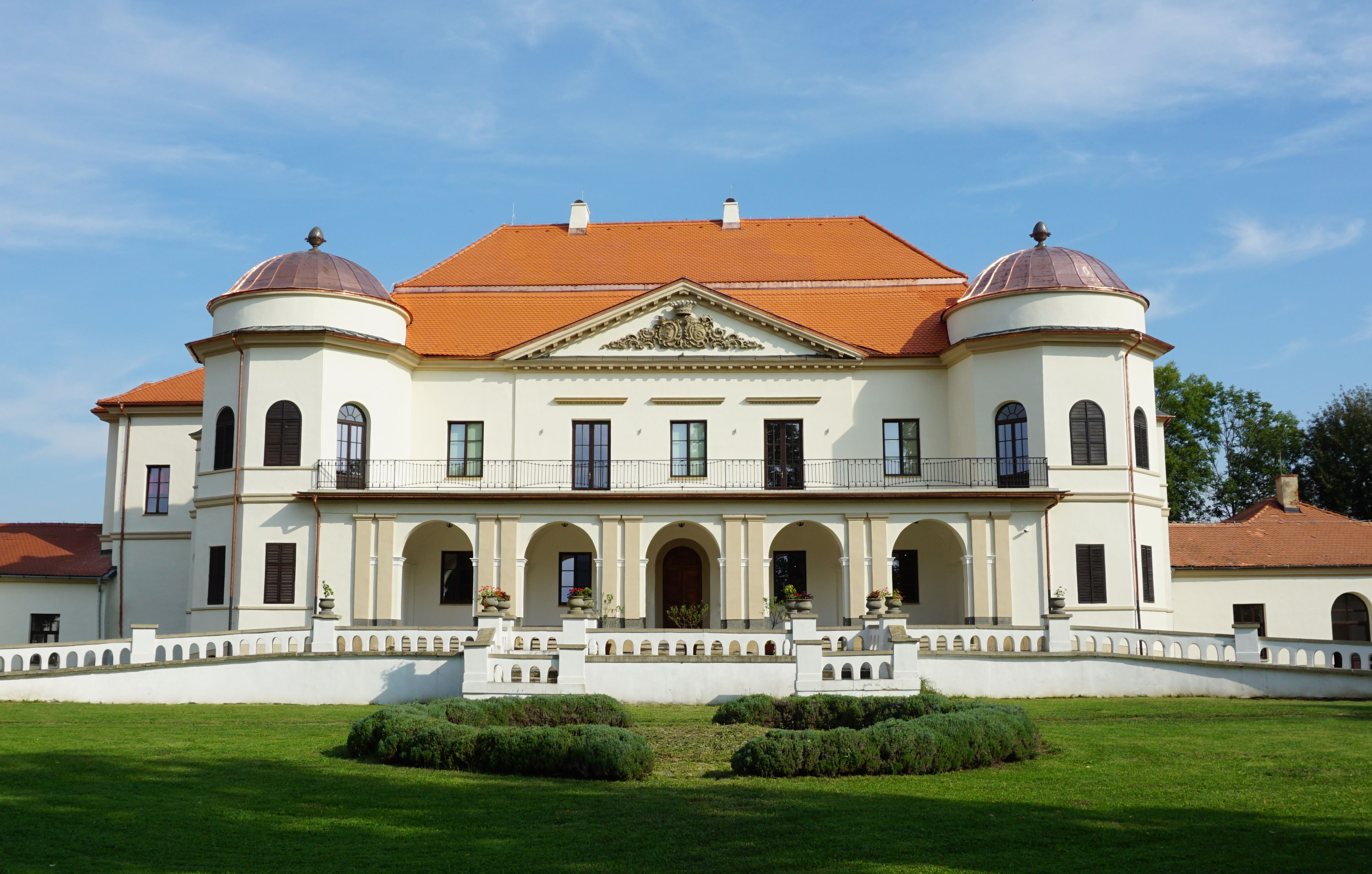

- Flag Coat of arms
- Etymology: St Michael
- Location in Slovakia Location in Košice Region
- Coordinates: 48°45′19″N 21°54′48″E
- Country: Slovakia
- Region: Košice Region
- District: Michalovce District
- First mentioned: 1244

Government
  - Mayor: Miroslav Dufinec (Hlas-SD)

Area
  - Total: 52.80 km^{2} (20.39 sq mi)
- (2022)
- Elevation: 113 m (371 ft)

Population (2025)
  - Total: 34,894
- Time zone: UTC+1 (CET)
  - Summer (DST): UTC+2 (CEST)
- Postal code: 071 01
- Area code: +421 56
- Vehicle registration plate (until 2022): MI
- Website: http://www.michalovce.sk

Michalovce (Hungarian: Nagymihály, German: Großmichel, Romani: Mihalya, Yiddish: מיכאלאָווצע Mikhaylovets or Mykhaylovyts; Ukrainian: Михайлівці) is a town on the Laborec river in eastern Slovakia. Originally named after the Archangel St Michael, it is the second-largest city in the Košice Region and the seat of the Michalovce District.

The city is located on the shore of Lake Sirava, approximately 360 kilometres (224 miles) east of the capital Bratislava and immediately adjacent to the border with Ukraine. Michalovce is mostly recognized for its adjacent lakes and volcanic mountains, which generates tourism, and for agriculture as well as the passing Druzhba pipeline. According to the latest census, the population of the town stood at 40,255, with a metropolitan population of 109,121, which ranks it among the largest population centers in eastern Slovakia.

== History ==
=== Early history ===
The city of present-day Michalovce along with the adjacent lowlands was settled in from the Palaeolithic era. Archaeologists have found prehistoric Homo sapiens skeletons in the region, as well as numerous objects and vestiges by the foot of the Vihorlat mountains, dating from the Neolithic. During the Late Bronze Age, which meant the period of processing bronze as the main metal, the surrounding area was an important cultural and trading center within the Carpathian Basin and, together with the area of the southern Tisa River Basin, played an important part forging relations with areas outside of the Carpathians. The history of Michalovce was significantly influenced by presence of Celtic tribes, starting from the Gallic expansions in the 4th century BC, and later by the Romans.

The town of Michalovce is the place where the legendary Prince Laborec died and was buried according to legends.

After the Ottoman conquest in south central Hungary in the sixteenth century, Hungary was divided, and present-day Michalovce became part of the Eastern Hungarian Kingdom, and later Royal Hungary. The town grew significantly in the eighteenth and nineteenth centuries. Since the Austrian-Hungarian Ausgleich of 1867, it achieved the status of a large community, and shortly afterward became the seat of one of the districts of Zemplén County.

=== Modern history ===
The 19th century brought back significant development of the town. In 1828, there were 49 craftsman workshops representing all 22 kinds of craft production of the crafts licences in the region of Zemplin. Until 1874 there were a few industrial factories of local importance in the surroundings of Michalovce (starch factories, distilleries, mill-houses, brickworks) with a limited number of work opportunities. The construction of the railway linking Michalovce with Medzilaborce in 1874, as well as the construction of the first railway linking Hungary with Galicia in 1871, had a profound impact on the production, business, and regional development in and around Michalovce.

More food-processing factories and industrial factories – a brewery, two brickworks and a steam millhouse – were established. Starting in 1876 doctors were employed in the town, as the Štefan Kukura Hospital was established that year. In 1896 the Hungarian language newspaper Felso Zemplén was published. In 1805 a common school is founded, which later changed into a state school. In 1804, a post office was established, and in 1873 a printing office was established.

In 1885, by a decision of the municipal council, a fire brigade was founded, and the first public lighting was provided. Unemployment, being a widespread side-effect of the 18th century, resulted in the emigration of mainly farmers. Many left to seek work in the coal mining industry in Pennsylvania, United States, giving rise to a large Rusyn American community there.

After World War I, in 1918 (confirmed by the Treaty of Trianon in 1920), Michalovce, along with some other parts of Zemplén County, became part of the then-formed Czechoslovakia. From 1939 to 1944, it was part of the Slovak Republic. In late summer and early autumn (August/September) 1944, 3500 Jewish inhabitants were deported from Michalovce. On 26 November 1944, the Red Army dislodged the Wehrmacht from Michalovce and it was once again part of Czechoslovakia. Since 1993, with the breakup of Czechoslovakia, Michalovce has been part of Slovakia. In 1996 it was made the seat of the Michalovce District.

The previous agricultural character of Michalovce was changed by a number of newly established industrial factories after 1945. In the 1950s and 1960s, factories processing agricultural products, and textile, engineering and construction companies arose. These included Agricultural Business and Supply Company, East-Slovak Dairy, East-Slovak Bakery and Confectionery, Slovak Malt Plant, East-Slovak Poultry Plant, Clothing Company and Odeta, a production company. During the early 1960s, construction of the Druzhba pipeline was a major source of employment.

== Geography ==
The municipality lies at an altitude of 113 metres (371 ft) and covers an area of 52.80 km^{2} (20.39 sq mi) (2025).

The town lies in the Košice Region, in the Eastern Slovak Lowland on the Laborec river, historically belonging to Zemplén County. The town is about 48 km (30 mi) east of Košice and 30 km (19 mi) west of Uzhhorod, Ukraine. Geographical features nearby include the Vihorlat Mountains and the Zemplínska šírava lake. Nearby is the biggest lake of the Vihorlat Mountains, Morské oko, Vinné castle and Vinné lake.

== Population ==
Historical population
Year	Pop.	±%
1970	20,655	—
1980	29,765	+44.1%
1991	38,823	+30.4%
2001	39,948	+2.9%
2011	40,027	+0.2%
2021	36,704	−8.3%
Source: Censuses

Population statistic (10 years)
Year	1995	2005	2015	2025
Count	40,968	39,922	39,455	34,894
Difference		−2.55%	−1.16%	−11.56%

Population statistic
Year	2024	2025
Count	35,310	34,894
Difference		−1.17%

It has a population of 34,894 people (31 December 2025).

In 1910, Michalovce had 6120 residents, of whom 3792 were Hungarian, 1586 Slovak and 542 German. The religious makeup was 38.6% Roman Catholic, 32.3% Jewish and 23.2% Greek Catholic. After World War II, due to the Presidential Benes decrees, almost the entire population of the region's ethnic Hungarians and Germans (including the region's native Carpathian Germans) were forcibly expelled. Those remaining were assimilated and subjected to Slovakization.

=== Ethnicity ===
Census 2021 (1+ %)
Ethnicity	Number	Fraction
Slovak	32,497	88.53%
Not found out	3657	9.96%
Romani	1209	3.29%
Rusyn	463	1.26%
Total	36,704	

In year 2021 was 36,704 people by ethnicity 32,497 as Slovak, 3657 as Not found out, 1209 as Romani, 463 as Rusyn, 270 as Czech, 200 as Ukrainian, 172 as Hungarian, 106 as Other, 55 as Russian, 31 as Vietnamese, 30 as Polish, 27 as German, 22 as English, 17 as Serbian, 15 as Bulgarian, 13 as Moravian, 11 as Chinese, 11 as Italian, 8 as Jewish, 4 as Greek, 4 as Croatian, 2 as Irish, 2 as Turkish, 2 as French, 2 as Albanian, 1 as Romanian, 1 as Austrian and 1 as Canadian.

Note on population: The difference values of population numbers in the table "Population statistic" and in the sections "Ethnicity" & "Religion" is caused by the use of various statistical methods.

The town has a significant Roma population. In 2019, they constituted an estimated 6% of the local population, or 1882 people, mainly concentrated in a settlement on the town's edge.

=== Religion ===
Census 2021 (1+ %)
Religion	Number	Fraction
Roman Catholic Church	15,817	43.09%
None	6363	17.34%
Greek Catholic Church	6111	16.65%
Not found out	3604	9.82%
Eastern Orthodox Church	1600	4.36%
Calvinist Church	1424	3.88%
Evangelical Church	964	2.63%
Total	36,704	

In year 2021 was 36,704 people by religion 15,817 from Roman Catholic Church, 6363 from None, 6111 from Greek Catholic Church, 3604 from Not found out, 1600 from Eastern Orthodox Church, 1424 from Calvinist Church, 964 from Evangelical Church, 344 from Jehovah's Witnesses, 72 from Other and not ascertained christian church, 62 from Other, 60 from Church of the Brethren, 58 from Ad hoc movements, 47 from Christian Congregations in Slovakia, 42 from Apostolic Church, 36 from United Methodist Church, 30 from Buddhism, 17 from Islam, 15 from Seventh-day Adventist Church, 11 from Paganism and natural spirituality, 8 from Jewish community, 8 from Old Catholic Church, 8 from Baptists Church, 2 from Church of Jesus Christ of Latter-day Saints and 1 from Hinduism.

== Education ==
The city of Michalovce is home to many secondary schools and some university colleges. Of the seven secondary schools, the most well-known and prestigious is the Pavol Horov Gymnasium. The other gymnasium is Gymnazium na ulici Ľudovita Štúra 26.

== Health care ==
The largest health care provider in the municipality is the Štefan Kukura Hospital in Michalovce, with 712 beds.

== Sport ==
The town has two professional top division clubs: football club MFK Zemplín Michalovce and ice hockey club HK Dukla Michalovce.

== Twin towns – sister cities ==
Michalovce is twinned with:

- Cognac, France
- Jarosław, Poland
- Kavarna, Bulgaria
- Liptovský Mikuláš, Slovakia
- Pančevo, Serbia
- Sátoraljaújhely, Hungary
- Uzhhorod, Ukraine
- Villarreal, Spain
- Vyškov, Czech Republic

== Notable people ==
- Presian, (ca.996-ca.1060) son of the Bulgarian tsar Ivan Vladislav (the gravestone of a certain "Prince Presian" was found in Michalovce)
- Ladislaus Bolchazy (1937–2012), Classical scholar, independent academic publisher, and Slovak cultural advocate
- Aurél Dessewffy (1808 at Nagy-Mihály – 1842), Hungarian journalist and politician.
- Táňa Radeva (1957–2025), actress
- Volodymyr Sichynskyi (1894 in Kamianets-Podilskyi – 1962) a Ukrainian émigré architect, graphic artist, and art historian.
- Emília Sičáková-Beblavá (born 1975 in Snina, Slovakia) a professor of Public Policy at the Comenius University in Bratislava.
- Tibor Feldman (born 25 April 1947 in Michalovce, Czechoslovakia—now Slovakia) is an American stage, film, and television actor, best known for his character roles in The Devil Wears Prada, The Sopranos, Law & Order, and numerous other film and television productions.
