= List of Hungarian monarchs =

This is a list of Hungarian monarchs; it includes the grand princes (895–1000) and the kings and ruling queens of Hungary (1000–1918).

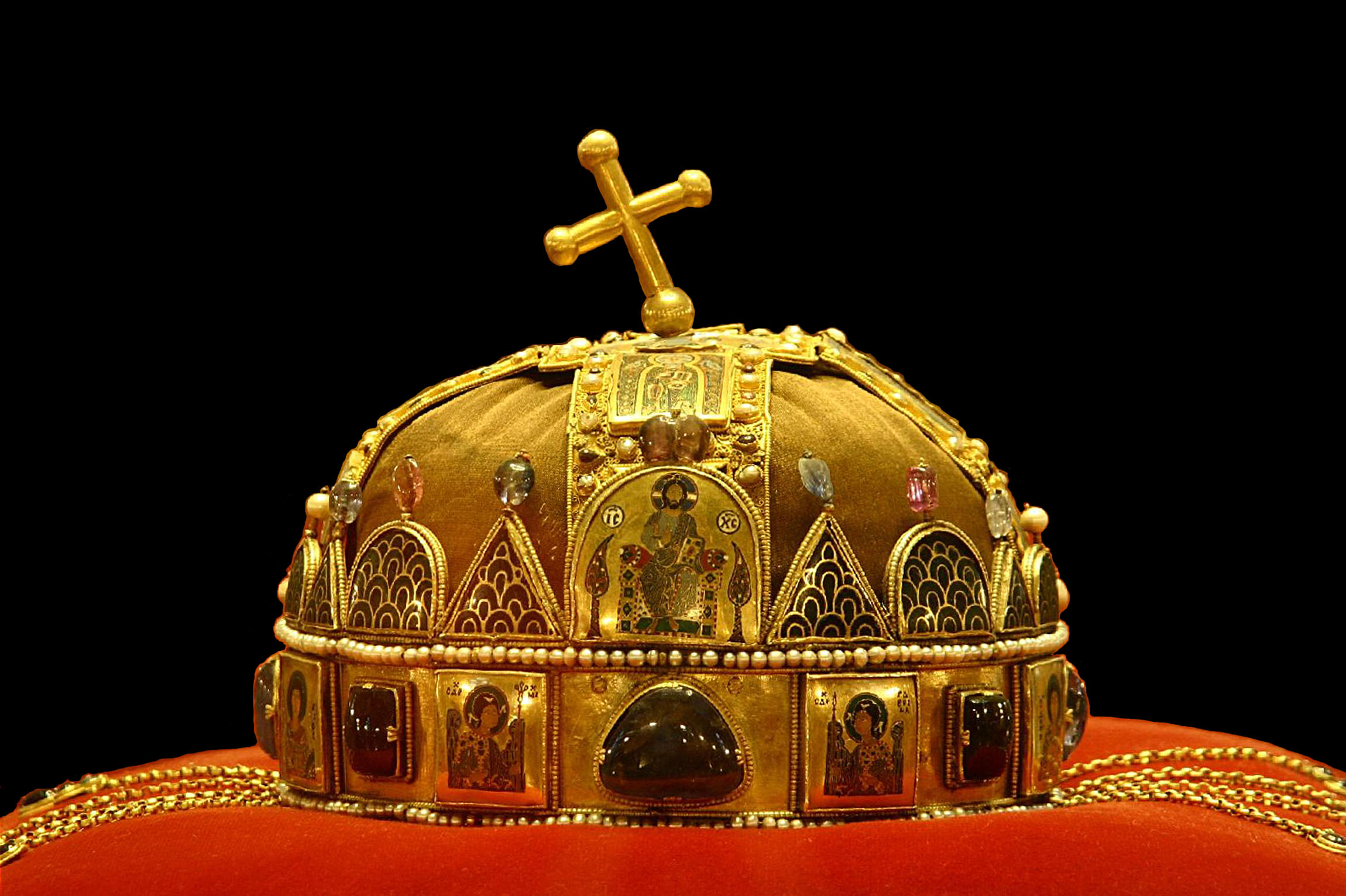
The Holy Crown of Hungary

The Hungarian Grand Principality was established around 895, following the 9th-century Hungarian conquest of the Carpathian Basin. The Kingdom of Hungary existed from 1000–1001 with the coronation of King Saint Stephen. The Árpád dynasty, the male-line descendants of Grand Prince Árpád, ruled Hungary continuously from 895 to 1301. Christianity was adopted as the state religion for the Kingdom of Hungary by King Saint Stephen and the kings of the Árpád dynasty used the title of the apostolic king. The descendants of the dynasty gave the world the highest number of saints and blesseds from one family. Therefore, since the 13th century the dynasty has often been referred to as the "Kindred of the Holy Kings". The Árpád dynasty ruled the Carpathian Basin for four hundred years, influencing almost all of Europe through its extensive dynastic connections. The paternal lineage of the Árpád dynasty came to end in 1301 with the death of King Andrew III of Hungary, and all of the subsequent kings of Hungary (with the exception of King Matthias Corvinus) were cognatic descendants of the Árpád dynasty. In 1918, after World War I, King Charles IV "renounced participation" in state affairs, but did not abdicate. The Kingdom of Hungary existed as a country from 1920 to 1946, and officially represented the Hungarian monarchy, but in reality there was no king.

== Chieftains before the Conquest (–895) ==
The kende (sacral leader) and the gyula (military leader) were the titles of the two leaders in the dual leadership system of the early Hungarians.

Name Reign	Portrait	Arms	Birth Parentage	Marriage(s) Issue	Death Burial	Notes
Ügyek / Előd Late 8th century ┃ Early 9th century	Előd, Hungarian Chieftain		Second half of the 8th century	Emese of Dentumoger: Álmos, Grand Prince of the Hungarians (c. 820)	First half of the 9th century Unknown	
Levedi Early 9th century				A Khazar princess		
Álmos; Kende or Gyula c. 850 ┃ c. 895	The Seven Captains, Árpád in the Center		c. 820 Son of Chieftain Ügyek or Előd "most noble prince of Scythia" and Emese of Dentumoger	Árpád, Grand Prince of the Hungarians (c. 845)	c. 820; Transylvania; Aged c. 75 Unknown	Grand Prince of the Hungarians; Hungarian conquest of the Carpathian Basin
Kurszán; Kende or Gyula ? ┃ c. 904	The Arrival of the Hungarians in Pannonia				c. 904; Fischa River Unknown	Hungarian conquest of the Carpathian Basin

== Grand Princes of Hungary (895–1000) ==
=== House of Árpád ===
The ruling Árpád dynasty is also referred to as the Turul dynasty. According to medieval Hungarian chronicles, King Attila had the Turul bird on his shield and it was the military badge of the Hungarians until the time of Grand Prince Géza.

The king-list for the first half of the 10th century is often disputed, as the Hungarian nation consisted of several tribes led by various leaders. The most frequently proposed list is:

Name Reign	Portrait	Arms	Birth Parentage	Marriage(s) Issue	Death Burial	Notes
House of Árpád
Árpád; Kende or Gyula c. 895 ┃ c. 907	The Seven Captains, Árpád in the Center		c. 845 Son of Álmos, Grand Prince of the Hungarians	Liüntika; Tarkatzus; Jelek; Jutocsa; Zoltán (c. 880)	c. 907; Aged c. 62 Unknown	Hungarian conquest of the Carpathian Basin
Zoltán c. 907 ┃ c. 947	King Stephen on the Throne		c. 880 Son of Árpád, Grand Prince of the Hungarians	Menumorut's daughter (?): Taksony, Grand Prince of the Hungarians (c. 931)	c. 947 Unknown	
Fajsz c. 947 ┃ 955	King Stephen on the Throne		Early 10th century Son of Jutocsa		c. 955 Unknown	Grandson of Árpád, Grand Prince of the Hungarians
Taksony c. 955 ┃ c. 972	King Stephen on the Throne		c. 931 Son of Zoltán, Grand Prince of the Hungarians and Menumorut's daughter (?)	"A Cuman" lady (A Khazar, Pecheneg or Volga Bulgarian woman): Géza, Grand Prince of the Hungarians (c. 940); Michael (c. 960)	c. 972; Aged c. 41 Unknown	
Géza c. 972 ┃ 997	King Stephen on the Throne		c. 940 Son of Taksony, Grand Prince of the Hungarians	Sarolt, daughter of Gyula of Transylvania: Judith; Stephen, Grand Prince of the Hungarians (c. 975); Grimelda, Dogaressa of Venice; Sarolta	997; Aged c. 52 Unknown	
Stephen; Born as Vajk 997 ┃ 1000	King Stephen on the Throne		c. 975; Esztergom Son of Géza, Grand Prince of the Hungarians and Sarolt, daughter of Gyula of Transylvania	Blessed Gisela of Bavaria; 996: Otto (Before 1002); Saint Emeric, Prince of Hungary (c. 1007)	15 August 1038; Esztergom or Székesfehérvár; Aged 62–63 Royal Basilica, Székesfehérvár, Kingdom of Hungary	Great-great-grandson of Árpád, Grand Prince of the Hungarians; Asserted his claim to rule and united the lands dominated by Hungarian lords, defeating rival Hungarian chieftains; Became the first King of Hungary

== Kings of Hungary (1000–1918) ==
=== House of Árpád (1000–1301) ===
Christianity was adopted as the state religion of the Kingdom of Hungary under King Saint Stephen, who became the first King of Hungary and was granted the title of Apostolic King. According to popular tradition, Stephen held up the crown before his death and consecrated himself and his kingdom to the Virgin Mary. Thereafter, Mary was depicted not only as the patron saint of the Kingdom of Hungary, but also as its queen. Stephen was crowned with the Holy Crown of Hungary, which symbolized the King's authority over the Lands of the Hungarian Crown and became a key mark of royal legitimacy. As the kingdom's coronation crown, it was used in the coronation of more than 50 kings throughout the history of Hungary.

The double cross, a symbol of royal power, appeared during the reign of King Béla III of Hungary (1172–1196). The Árpád dynasty's striped coat of arms, the Árpád stripes appeared for the first time on the ornate seal of the Golden Bull of King Emeric of Hungary (1196–1204), issued in 1202.

Name Reign Coronation	Portrait	Arms	Birth Parentage	Marriage(s) Issue	Death Burial	Notes
House of Árpád (1000–1301)
Stephen I Saint Stephen; Hungarian: I. István; 1st king of Hungary 25 December 1000 ┃ 15 August 1038 (37 years, 234 days) 25 December 1000; Esztergom or Székesfehérvár	King Stephen on the Throne		c. 975; Esztergom Son of Géza, Grand Prince of the Hungarians and Sarolt, daughter of Gyula of Transylvania	Blessed Gisela of Bavaria; 996: Otto (Before 1002); Saint Emeric, Prince of Hungary (c. 1007)	15 August 1038; Esztergom or Székesfehérvár; Aged 62–63 Royal Basilica, Székesfehérvár, Kingdom of Hungary	First King of Hungary; Christianity was adopted as the state religion for the Kingdom of Hungary; Apostolic King; Holy Crown of Hungary
Peter; Peter Orseolo or Peter the Venetian; Hungarian: Péter; 2nd king of Hungary First reign 15 August 1038 ┃ September 1041 (3 years, 1 months) 1038; Székesfehérvár	King Peter		1011; Venice Son of Otto Orseolo, Doge of Venice and Grimelda, daughter of Géza, Grand Prince of the Hungarians	Judith of Schweinfurt c. 1055 No issue	30 August 1046 or 1059; Székesfehérvár; Aged 35 or 48 Pécs Cathedral, Pécs, Kingdom of Hungary	Nephew of Saint Stephen, King of Hungary; Grandson of Géza, Grand Prince of the Hungarians
Samuel; Samuel Aba; Hungarian: Sámuel; 3rd king of Hungary September 1041 ┃ 5 July 1044; Battle of Ménfő (2 years, 10 months) 22 April 1044; Csanád or Székesfehérvár	King Samuel Aba		c. 990 or c. 1009	Daughter of Géza, Grand Prince of the Hungarians (Historians suppose that the powerful Aba family descended from him)	5 July 1044 or soon after the Battle of Ménfő; Aged 35 or 54 Abasár Monastery, Abasár, Kingdom of Hungary	Brother-in-law of Saint Stephen, King of Hungary; House of Aba
Peter; Peter Orseolo or Peter the Venetian; Hungarian: Péter; 2nd king of Hungary Second reign 5 July 1044 ┃ 30 August 1046 (2 years, 57 days)	King Peter		1011; Venice Son of Otto Orseolo, Doge of Venice and Grimelda, daughter of Géza, Grand Prince of the Hungarians	Judith of Schweinfurt c. 1055 No issue	30 August 1046 or 1059; Székesfehérvár; Aged 35 or 48 Pécs Cathedral, Pécs, Kingdom of Hungary	Nephew of Saint Stephen, King of Hungary; Grandson of Géza, Grand Prince of the Hungarians
Andrew I Endre or Andrew the White or the Catholic; Hungarian: I. András; 4th king of Hungary September 1046 ┃ December 1060 (14 years, 3 months) September 1046; Székesfehérvár	Coronation of King Andrew		c. 1015 Son of Vazul and a lady from the Clan Tátony	Anastasia of Kiev c. 1038: Adelaide, Duchess of Bohemia (c. 1040); Solomon, King of Hungary (1053); David, Prince of Hungary (1053–55); George (illegitimate)	Before 5 December 1060; Zirc; Aged 44–45 Tihany Abbey, Tihany, Kingdom of Hungary	Great-grandson of Taksony, Grand Prince of the Hungarians; Son of Vazul, the cousin of Saint Stephen, King of Hungary
Béla I Béla the Champion; Hungarian: I. Béla; 5th king of Hungary 6 December 1060 ┃ 11 September 1063 (2 years, 280 days) 6 December 1060; Székesfehérvár	King Béla I		c. 1016 Son of Vazul and a lady from the Clan Tátony	Richeza of Poland c. 1033: Géza I, King of Hungary (c. 1040); Saint Ladislaus, King of Hungary (c. 1040); Lampert, Duke of Hungary (After 1050); Sophia, Duchess of Saxony (After 1050); Euphemia, Duchess of Olomouc (After 1050); Helena, Queen of Croatia (After 1050); One or two further daughters	11 September 1063; Kanizsa Creek; Aged 44–45 Szekszárd Abbey, Szekszárd, Kingdom of Hungary	Great-grandson of Taksony, Grand Prince of the Hungarians; Son of Vazul, the cousin of Saint Stephen, King of Hungary; Younger brother of Andrew I, King of Hungary
Solomon; Hungarian: Salamon; 6th king of Hungary 11 September 1063 ┃ 14 March 1074; Battle of Mogyoród (10 years, 185 days) 1057 or 1058 (junior king); September 1063; Székesfehérvár	King Solomon		1053 Son of Andrew I, King of Hungary and Anastasia of Kiev	Judith of Swabia; 1063 No issue	1087 (?); Aged 34 (?) Pula, Kingdom of Croatia	
Géza I Magnus; Hungarian: I. Géza; 7th king of Hungary 14 March 1074 ┃ 25 April 1077 (3 years, 43 days) 1075; Székesfehérvár	King Géza I		c. 1040; Poland Son of Béla I, King of Hungary and Richeza of Poland	1st marriage Sophia; 1060s: Coloman, King of Hungary (c. 1070); Álmos, Duke of Hungary (c. 1070) 2nd marriage Synadene 1075; Katalin	25 April 1077; Vác; Aged 36–37 Vác Cathedral, Vác, Kingdom of Hungary	
Ladislaus I Saint Ladislaus; Hungarian: I. László; 8th king of Hungary 25 April 1077 ┃ 29 July 1095 (18 years, 96 days) 1081; Székesfehérvár	The Coronation of Ladislaus the First		c. 1040; Kraków Son of Béla I, King of Hungary and Richeza of Poland	Adelaide of Rheinfelden c. 1078: Saint Irene, Empress of the Byzantine Empire (1088); Two daughters	29 July 1095; Nyitra; Aged 54–55 Nagyvárad Monastery, Nagyvárad, Kingdom of Hungary	King of Croatia (1091–1095)
Coloman; Coloman the Learned or the Bookish; Hungarian: Kálmán; 9th king of Hungary 29 July 1095 ┃ 3 February 1116 (20 years, 190 days) 1095; Székesfehérvár	King Coloman		c. 1070; Székesfehérvár Son of Géza I, King of Hungary and Sophia	1st marriage Felicia of Sicily; 1097: Sophia, Princess of Hungary (1097); Stephen II, King of Hungary (c. 1101); Ladislaus (c. 1101) 2nd marriage Eufemia of Kiev 1112 No issue	3 February 1116; Székesfehérvár; Aged 45–46 Royal Basilica, Székesfehérvár, Kingdom of Hungary	King of Croatia (1097–1116); Croatia entered in personal union with Hungary (1102–1918)
Stephen II; Hungarian: II. István; 10th king of Hungary 3 February 1116 ┃ 1 March 1131 (15 years, 27 days) 1105 (junior king); 1116; Székesfehérvár	King Stephen II		c. 1101; Székesfehérvár Son of Coloman, King of Hungary and Felicia of Sicily	1st marriage A daughter of Robert I of Capua; Early 1120s No issue 2nd marriage Adelheid of Riedenburg No issue	1 March 1131; Székesfehérvár; Aged 30 Váradhegyfok, Kingdom of Hungary	
Béla II; Béla the Blind; Hungarian: II. Béla; 11th king of Hungary 1 March 1131 ┃ 13 February 1141 (9 years, 350 days) 28 April 1131; Székesfehérvár	King Béla II		c. 1108; Tolna county Son of Álmos, Duke of Hungary and Predslava of Kiev	Helena of Serbia; 1129: Elizabeth, Duchess of Greater Poland (c. 1128); Géza II, King of Hungary (1130); Ladislaus II, King of Hungary (1131); Stephen IV, King of Hungary (c. 1133); Álmos (c. 1134); Sophia, Princess of Hungary (c. 1136)	13 February 1141; Székesfehérvár; Aged 31–32 Royal Basilica, Székesfehérvár, Kingdom of Hungary	Grandson of Géza I, King of Hungary; Cousin of Stephen II, King of Hungary
Géza II; Hungarian: II. Géza; 12th king of Hungary 13 February 1141 ┃ 31 May 1162 (21 years, 108 days) 16 February 1141; Székesfehérvár	King Géza II in Royal Regalia		1130; Tolna county Son of Béla II, King of Hungary and Helena of Serbia	Euphrosyne of Kiev; 1146: Stephen III, King of Hungary (1147); Béla III, King of Hungary (c. 1148); Elisabeth, Duchess of Bohemia (c. 1149); Géza, Prince of Hungary (c. 1151); Árpád; Odola (c. 1156); Helena, Duchess of Austria (c. 1155); Margaret (1162)	31 May 1162; Székesfehérvár; Aged 31–32 Royal Basilica, Székesfehérvár, Kingdom of Hungary	
Stephen III; Hungarian: III. István; 13th king of Hungary 31 May 1162 ┃ 4 March 1172 (9 years, 279 days) June 1162; Székesfehérvár	The Coronation of Stephen III		Summer 1147; Székesfehérvár Son of Géza II, King of Hungary and Euphrosyne of Kiev	Agnes of Austria; 1166: Béla (1167); Unnamed son	4 March 1172; Esztergom; Aged 24–25 Esztergom Basilica, Esztergom, Kingdom of Hungary	
Ladislaus II; Hungarian: II. László; Anti-king 31 July 1162 ┃ 14 January 1163 (168 days) July 1162; Székesfehérvár	Prince Ladislaus, the Usurper of the Throne and the Stealing of the Crown		1131; Székesfehérvár Son of Béla II, King of Hungary and Helena of Serbia	Judith of Poland; 1140s: Mary (c. 1148)	14 January 1162; Aged 31–32 Royal Basilica, Székesfehérvár, Kingdom of Hungary	
Stephen IV; Hungarian: IV. István; Anti-king 27 January 1163 ┃ 11 April 1165 (2 years, 75 days) 27 January 1163; Székesfehérvár	The Usurper Prince Stephen		c. 1133; Buda Son of Béla II, King of Hungary and Helena of Serbia	Maria Komnene c. 1157<h/>No issue	11 April 1165; Zimony; Aged 31–32 Royal Basilica, Székesfehérvár, Kingdom of Hungary	
Béla III; Béla the Great; Hungarian: III. Béla; 16th king of Hungary 4 March 1172 ┃ 23 April 1196 (24 years, 51 days) 13 January 1173; Székesfehérvár	King Béla III		c. 1148; Esztergom Son of Géza II, King of Hungary and Euphrosyne of Kiev	1st marriage Agnes of Antioch; 1170: Emeric, King of Hungary (1174); Margaret, Empress of the Byzantine Empire (1175); Andrew II, King of Hungary (c. 1177); Constance, Queen of Bohemia (c. 1180); Unnamed daughter; Salamon; Stephen 2nd marriage Margaret of France 1186 No issue	23 April 1196; Székesfehérvár; Aged 47–48 Royal Basilica, Székesfehérvár, Kingdom of Hungary	Former heir of the Byzantine Empire
Emeric; Hungarian: Imre; 17th king of Hungary 23 April 1196 ┃ 30 November 1204 (8 years, 222 days) 16 May 1182 (junior king); Esztergom	King Emeric		c. 1174; Székesfehérvár Son of Béla III, King of Hungary and Agnes of Antioch	Constance of Aragon; 1198: Ladislaus III, King of Hungary (c. 1200)	30 November 1204; Esztergom; Aged 29–30 Eger, Kingdom of Hungary	
Ladislaus III; Hungarian: III. László; 18th king of Hungary 30 November 1204 ┃ 7 May 1205 (159 days) 26 August 1204; Székesfehérvár	King Ladislaus III		c. 1200; Székesfehérvár Son of Emeric, King of Hungary and Constance of Aragon	Unmarried	7 May 1205; Vienna; Aged 4–6 Royal Basilica, Székesfehérvár, Kingdom of Hungary	
Andrew II; Andrew the Jerosolimitan; Hungarian: II. András; 19th king of Hungary 7 May 1205 ┃ 21 September 1235 (30 years, 138 days) 29 May 1205; Székesfehérvár	King Andrew II		c. 1177; Székesfehérvár Son of Béla III, King of Hungary and Agnes of Antioch	1st marriage Gertrude of Merania c. 1200–1203: Anna Maria, Empress of Bulgaria (1204); Béla IV, King of Hungary (1206); Saint Elizabeth, Landgravine of Thuringia (1207); Coloman of Halych (1208); Andrew II of Halych (c. 1210) 2nd marriage Yolanda of Courtenay 1215; Yolanda, Queen of Aragon (c. 1215) 3rd marriage Beatrice D'Este 1234; Stephen the Posthumous, Duke of Slavonia (1236)	21 September 1235; Aged 57–58 Egres Abbey, Egres, Kingdom of Hungary	
Béla IV; The Second Founder of the State; Hungarian: IV. Béla; 20th king of Hungary 21 September 1235 ┃ 3 May 1270 (34 years, 225 days) 1214 (junior king); 14 October 1235; Székesfehérvár	King Béla IV		29 November 1206 Son of Andrew II, King of Hungary and Gertrude of Merania	Maria Laskarina; 1220: Saint Kinga, High Duchess of Poland (1224); Margaret (c. 1225); Anna, Duchess of Macsó (1226); Catherina (c. 1229); Blessed Yolanda, Duchess of Poland (c. 1235); Elizabeth, Duchess of Bavaria (1236); Constance, Queen of Galicia (c. 1237); Stephen V, King of Hungary (1239); Saint Margaret, Princess of Hungary (1242); Béla, Duke of Slavonia (c. 1249)	3 May 1270; Rabbits' Island, Kingdom of Hungary; Aged 63–64 Minorites' Church, Esztergom, Kingdom of Hungary	
Stephen V Hungarian: V. István; 21st king of Hungary 3 May 1270 ┃ 6 August 1272 (2 years, 95 days) Before 10 January 1246 (junior king); Székesfehérvár; 5 December 1262 (junior king as ruling title); 13 May 1270; Székesfehérvár	Coronation of King Stephen V		Before 18 October 1239 Son of Béla IV, King of Hungary and Maria Laskarina	Elizabeth the Cuman; 1253: Blessed Elizabeth, Queen of Serbia (c. 1255); Catherine, Queen of Serbia (c. 1256); Mary, Queen of Naples (c. 1257); Anna, Empress of the Byzantine Empire (c. 1260); Ladislaus IV, King of Hungary (1262); Andrew, Duke of Slavonia (1268)	6 August 1272; Csepel Island; Aged 32–33 Monastery of the Blessed Virgin, Rabbits' Island, Kingdom of Hungary	
Ladislaus IV; Ladislaus the Cuman; Hungarian: IV. László; 22nd king of Hungary 6 August 1272 ┃ 10 July 1290 (17 years, 339 days) Before 3 September 1272; Székesfehérvár	King Ladislaus IV		5 August 1262 Son of Stephen V, King of Hungary and Elizabeth the Cuman	Elizabeth of Sicily; 1270 No issue	10 July 1290; Aged 27–28 Csanád Cathedral, Csanád, Kingdom of Hungary	
Andrew III; Andrew the Venetian; Hungarian: III. András; 23rd king of Hungary 10 July 1290 ┃ 14 January 1301 (10 years, 189 days) 23 July 1290; Székesfehérvár	King Andrew III		c. 1265; Venice Son of Stephen the Posthumous, Duke of Slavonia and Tomasina Morosini	1st marriage Feneanna of Kuyavia; 1290: Blessed Elizabeth, Princess of Hungary (1292) 2nd marriage Agnes of Austria 1296 No issue	14 January 1301; Aged 35–36 Minorites' Church, Buda, Kingdom of Hungary	Grandson of Andrew II, King of Hungary

=== House of Přemyslid (1301–1305) ===
Name Reign Coronation	Portrait	Arms	Birth Parentage	Marriage(s) Issue	Death Burial	Notes
House of Přemyslid (1301–1305)
Wenceslaus; Ladislaus or Wenceslaus the Czech; Hungarian: Vencel; 24th king of Hungary 27 August 1301 ┃ 9 October 1305 (4 years, 44 days) 27 August 1301; Székesfehérvár	King Wenceslaus returns to Bohemia		6 October 1289; Prague, Kingdom of Bohemia Son of Wenceslaus II, King of Bohemia and Judith of Habsburg	Viola of Teschen; 1305 No issue: Elizabeth, Abbess of Pustiměřu (illegitimate)	4 August 1306; Olomouc, Kingdom of Bohemia; Aged 16–17 Zbraslav Monastery, Zbraslav, Kingdom of Bohemia	2nd great grandson of Béla IV, King of Hungary by Anna; 2nd great grandson of Béla III, King of Hungary by Constance; He abdicated the throne in favor of Otto III, Duke of Bavaria

=== House of Wittelsbach (1305–1307) ===
Name Reign Coronation	Portrait	Arms	Birth Parentage	Marriage(s) Issue	Death Burial	Notes
House of Wittelsbach (1305–1307)
Otto; Otto the Bavarian; Hungarian: Ottó; 25th king of Hungary 9 October 1305 ┃ 1307 (2 years) 5 December 1305; Székesfehérvár	King Otto		11 February 1261; Burghausen, Duchy of Bavaria Son of Henry XIII, Duke of Bavaria and Elizabeth of Hungary	1st marriage Catherine of Habsburg; January 1279: Heny and Rudolph (1280) 2nd marriage Agnes of Glogau 18 May 1309; Agnes of Wittelsbach (1310); Henry XV, Duke of Bavaria (1312)	9 November 1312; Landshut, Duchy of Bavaria; Aged 51–52 Seligenthal Monastery, Landshut, Duchy of Bavaria	Grandson of Béla IV, King of Hungary

=== House of Anjou (1308–1395) ===
Name Reign Coronation	Portrait	Arms	Birth Parentage	Marriage(s) Issue	Death Burial	Notes
House of Anjou (1308–1395)
Charles I Charles Robert; Hungarian: I. Károly; 26th king of Hungary 17 November 1308 ┃ 16 July 1342 (33 years, 242 days) 1st coronation Spring 1301; Esztergom 2nd coronation 15 June 1309; Buda 3rd coronation 27 August 1310; Székesfehérvár	King Charles I		1288; Naples, Kingdom of Naples Son of Charles Martel of Anjou and Clemence of Habsburg	1st marriage Maria of Galicia No issue 2nd marriage Mary of Bytom; 1306/11: Catherine, Duchess of Świdnica (?) 3rd marriage Beatrice of Luxembourg February 1319 No issue 4th marriage Elisabeth of Poland 6 July 1320; Catherine, Duchess of Świdnica (?); Louis I, King of Hungary (1326); Andrew, Duke of Calabria (1327); Stephen, Duke of Transylvania, Croatia, Dalmatia and Slavonia (1332)	16 July 1342; Visegrád, Kingdom of Hungary; Aged 53–54 Royal Basilica, Székesfehérvár, Kingdom of Hungary	Great-grandson of Stephen V, King of Hungary by Mary
Louis I Louis the Great; Hungarian: I. Lajos; 27th king of Hungary 16 July 1342 ┃ 10 September 1382 (40 years, 57 days) 21 July 1342; Székesfehérvár	King Louis on the Throne		5 March 1326; Visegrád, Kingdom of Hungary Son of Charles I, King of Hungary and Elizabeth of Poland	1st marriage Margaret of Bohemia; 1342–45 No issue 2nd marriage Elizabeth of Bosnia; 20 June 1353: Catherine, Princess of Hungary (1370); Mary, Queen of Hungary (1371); Saint Hedwig, Queen of Poland (1373)	10 September 1382; Nagyszombat, Kingdom of Hungary; Aged 56–57 Royal Basilica, Székesfehérvár, Kingdom of Hungary	2nd great-grandson of Stephen V, King of Hungary by Mary; 2nd great grandson of Béla IV, King of Hungary by Yolanda; King of Poland (1370–1382)
Mary; Hungarian: Mária; 28th "king" of Hungary First reign 10 September 1382 ┃ December 1385 (3 years, 3 months) 17 September 1382; Székesfehérvár	Queen Mary		14 April 1371; Buda, Kingdom of Hungary Daughter of Louis I, King of Hungary and Elizabeth of Bosnia	Sigismund of Luxembourg; 1 November 1385: Newborn son (1395)	17 May 1395; Buda, Kingdom of Hungary; Aged 23–24 St. Mary Cathedral, Várad, Kingdom of Hungary	First Queen of Hungary; Connection to the Árpád dynasty
Charles II; Charles the Small; Hungarian: II. Károly; 29th king of Hungary 31 December 1385 ┃ 24 February 1386 (56 days) 31 December 1385; Székesfehérvár	King Charles II		1345; Durazzo, Kingdom of Naples Son of Louis of Durazzo and Margaret of Sanseverino	Margaret of Durazzo; 24 January 1369: Joanna II, Queen of Naples (1371); Ladislaus, King of Naples (1377)	24 February 1386; Visegrád, Kingdom of Hungary; Aged 41 Visegrád, Kingdom of Hungary	2nd great-grandson of Stephen V, King of Hungary by Mary; King of Naples (1382–1386)
Mary; Hungarian: Mária; 28th "king" of Hungary Second reign Reign with Sigismund (1387–1395); 24 February 1386 ┃ 17 May 1395 (9 years, 83 days)	Queen Mary		14 April 1371; Buda, Kingdom of Hungary Daughter of Louis I, King of Hungary and Elizabeth of Bosnia	Sigismund of Luxembourg; 1 November 1385: Newborn son (1395)	17 May 1395; Buda, Kingdom of Hungary; Aged 23–24 St. Mary Cathedral, Várad, Kingdom of Hungary	First Queen of Hungary; Connection to the Árpád dynasty
Ladislaus; Hungarian: László; Anti-king 13 July 1403 ┃ 7 November 1403 (168 days) 5 August 1403; Zadar	King Charles II		15 February 1377; Naples, Kingdom of Naples Son of Charles II, King of Hungary and Margaret of Durazzo	1st marriage Costanza Chiaramonte; 1390 No issue 2nd marriage Mary of Lusignan; 12 February 1403 No issue 3rd marriage Mary of Enghien; 1406 No issue	6 August 1414; Naples, Kingdom of Naples; Aged 37 St. John Church, Naples, Kingdom of Naples	King of Naples (1386–1414)

=== House of Luxembourg (1387–1437) ===
Name Reign Coronation	Portrait	Arms	Birth Parentage	Marriage(s) Issue	Death Burial	Notes
House of Luxembourg (1387–1437)
Sigismund; Sigismund of Luxembourg; Hungarian: Zsigmond; 30th king of Hungary Reign with Mary (1387–1395); 31 March 1387 ┃ 9 December 1437 (50 years, 254 days) 31 March 1387; Székesfehérvár			15 February 1368; Nuremberg, Holy Roman Empire Son of Charles IV, Holy Roman Emperor and Elizabeth of Pomerania	1st marriage Mary, Queen of Hungary; 1 November 1385: Newborn son (1395) 2nd marriage Barbara of Cilli 6 December 1405; Elizabeth, Queen of Hungary (1409)	9 December 1437; Znojmo, Kingdom of Bohemia; Aged 69–70 St. Mary Cathedral, Várad, Kingdom of Hungary	Connection to the Árpád dynasty; Husband of Mary, Queen of Hungary; King of Germany (1410–1437); King of Bohemia (1419–1437); Holy Roman Emperor (1433–1437)

=== House of Habsburg (1437–1457) ===
Name Reign Coronation	Portrait	Arms	Birth Parentage	Marriage(s) Issue	Death Burial	Notes
House of Habsburg (1437–1457)
Albert; Albert the Habsburg; Hungarian: Albert; 31st king of Hungary 18 December 1437 ┃ 27 October 1439 (1 year, 314 days) 1 January 1438; Székesfehérvár			16 August 1397; Vienna, Ducy of Austria Son of Albert IV, Duke of Austria and Joanna Sophia of Bavaria	Elizabeth of Luxembourg; 19 April 1422: Anne, Duchess of Luxembourg (1432); George (1435); Elizabeth, Queen of Poland (c. 1436–39); Ladislaus the Posthumous, King of Hungary, Croatia and Bohemia (1440)	27 October 1439; Neszmély, Kingdom of Hungary; Aged 42–43 Royal Basilica,Székesfehérvár, Kingdom of Hungary	7th great grandson of Géza II, King of Hungary by Elizabeth; Husband of Elizabeth, daughter of Sigismund, King of Hungary; King of Germany (1438–1439); King of Bohemia (1438–1439)
Ladislaus V Ladislaus the Posthumous; Hungarian: V. László; 32nd king of Hungary 15 May 1440 ┃ 23 November 1457 (17 year, 193 days) 15 May 1440; Székesfehérvár			22 February 1440; Komárom, Kingdom of Hungary Son of Albert, King of Hungary and Elizabeth of Luxembourg	Unmarried	23 November 1457; Prague; Aged 17–18 St. Vitus Cathedral, Prague, Kingdom of Bohemia	After Ladislaus's birth, his mother seized the Holy Crown of Hungary and had Ladislaus crowned king. However, the Diet of Hungary declared Ladislaus's coronation invalid and elected Vladislaus I as king.; King of Bohemia (1453–1457)

=== House of Jagiellon (1440–1444) ===
Name Reign Coronation	Portrait	Arms	Birth Parentage	Marriage(s) Issue	Death Burial	Notes
House of Jagiellon (1440–1444)
Vladislaus I Vladislaus the Polish; Hungarian: I. Ulászló; 33rd king of Hungary 17 July 1440 ┃ 10 November 1444 (4 years, 117 days) (Not with the Holy Crown of Hungary); 17 July 1440; Székesfehérvár			31 October 1424; Kraków, Kingdom of Poland Son of Władysław II, King of Poland and Sophia of Halshany	Unmarried	10 November 1444; Battle of Varna; Aged 20–21 (presumed) The king's body was lost in the battlefield	Connection to the Árpád dynasty; King of Poland (1434–1444); Supreme Duke of Lithuania (1434–1444)

=== House of Hunyadi (1458–1490) ===
Name Reign Coronation	Portrait	Arms	Birth Parentage	Marriage(s) Issue	Death Burial	Notes
House of Hunyadi (1458–1490)
Matthias I Matthias the Just; Hungarian: Mátyás; 34th king of Hungary 24 January 1458 ┃ 6 April 1490 (32 years, 73 days) 29 March 1464; Székesfehérvár			23 February 1443; Kolozsvár, Kingdom of Hungary Son of John Hunyadi, Regent-Governor of Hungary and Elizabeth Szilágyi	1st marriage Elizabeth of Celje; Spring 1455 No issue 2nd marriage Catherine of Poděbrady; 1 May 1463: Newborn son (1463) 3rd marriage Beatrice of Naples 22 December 1476 No issue; John Corvinus (1473) (illegitimate from Barbara Edelpöck)	6 April 1490; Vienna, Archduchy of Austria; Aged 47–48 Royal Basilica, Székesfehérvár, Kingdom of Hungary	King of Bohemia (1469–1490); Archduke of Austria (1486–1490)

=== House of Jagiellon (1490–1526) ===
Name Reign Coronation	Portrait	Arms	Birth Parentage	Marriage(s) Issue	Death Burial	Notes
House of Jagiellon (1490–1526)
Vladislaus II; Vladislaus Dobzse; Hungarian: II. Ulászló; 35th king of Hungary 15 July 1490 ┃ 13 March 1516 (25 years, 243 days) 18 September 1490; Székesfehérvár			1 March 1456; Kraków, Kingdom of Poland Son of Casimir IV, King of Poland and Elizabeth of Austria	1st marriage Barbara of Brandenburg; 20 August 1476 No issue 2nd marriage Beatrice of Naples; 4 October 1490 No issue 3rd marriage Anne of Foix-Candale; 29 September 1502: Anne, Queen of Hungary (1503); Louis II, King of Hungary (1506)	13 March 1516; Buda, Kingdom of Hungary; Aged 60–61 Royal Basilica, Székesfehérvár, Kingdom of Hungary	Grandson of Albert, King of Hungary; Great grandson of Sigismund, King of Hungary; King of Bohemia (1471–1516)
Louis II; Hungarian: II. Lajos; 36th king of Hungary 13 March 1516 ┃ 29 August 1526 (10 year, 170 days) 4 June 1508; Székesfehérvár			1 July 1506; Buda, Kingdom of Hungary Son of Vladislaus II, King of Hungary and Anne of Foix-Candale	Mary of Austria; 1515 No issue	29 August 1526; Battle of Mohács, Kingdom of Hungary; Aged 20–21 Royal Basilica, Székesfehérvár, Kingdom of Hungary	King of Bohemia (1516–1526)

King Louis II of Hungary died at Battle of Mohács in 1526. After the death of the Hungarian king, both the Hungarian noble Zápolya family and the Austrian Habsburg family claimed the whole kingdom. King John I from the Zápolya family ruled the Eastern Hungarian Kingdom, and King Ferdinand I from the Habsburg family ruled the western part of Kingdom of Hungary.

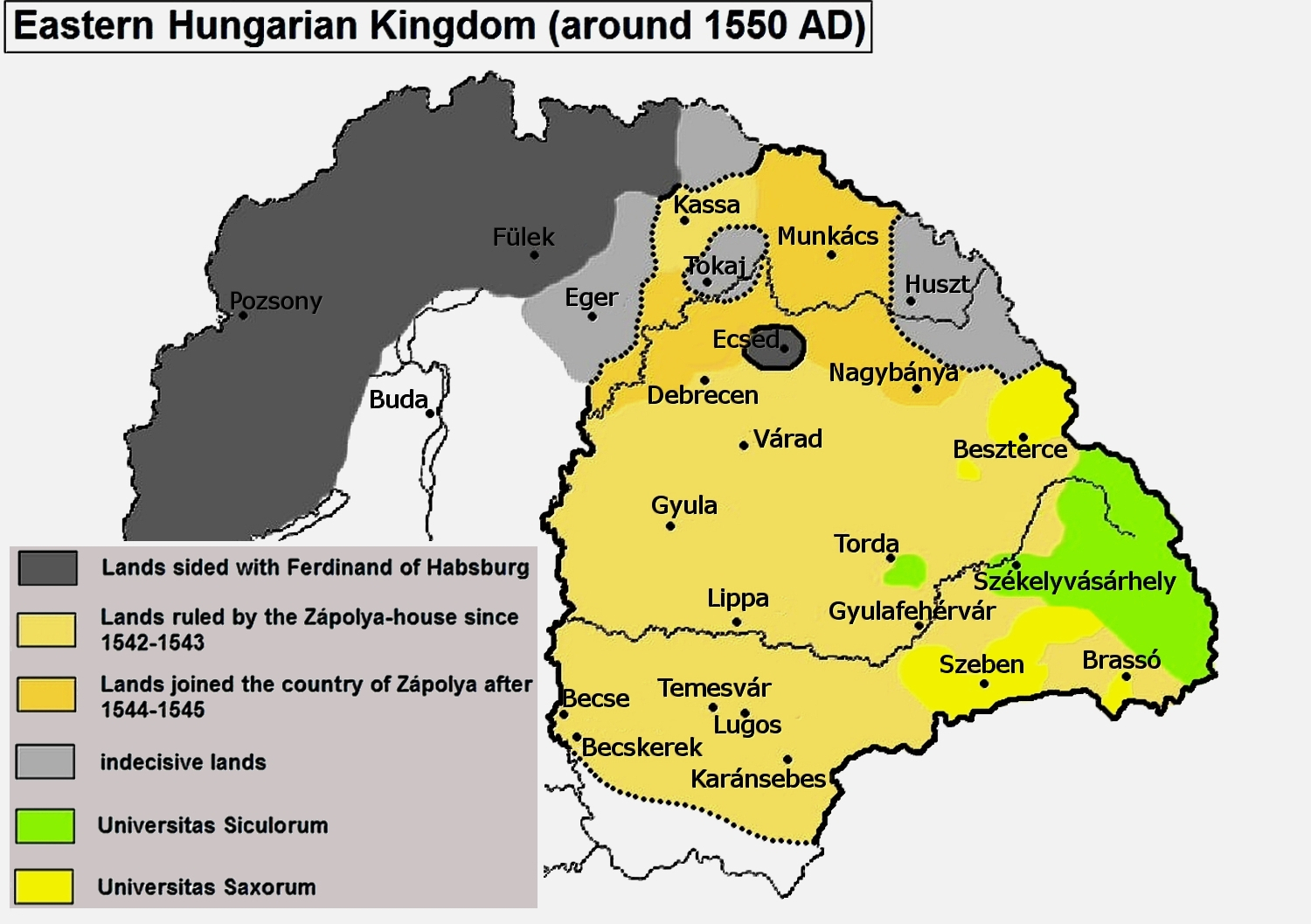
The western Royal Hungary ruled by King Ferdinand I and the Eastern Hungarian Kingdom ruled by King John I at the end of 1526. The Ottomans captured Buda in 1541 and the central areas of the kingdom came under the authority of the Ottoman Empire, therefore Hungary was divided into three parts.

=== House of Zápolya (1526–1540) ===
Name Reign Coronation	Portrait	Arms	Birth Parentage	Marriage(s) Issue	Death Burial	Notes
House of Zápolya (1526–1540)
John I John Zápolya; Hungarian: I. János; 37th king of Hungary 11 November 1526 ┃ 22 July 1540 (13 years, 255 days) 11 November 1526; Székesfehérvár			1487; Szepesváralja, Kingdom of Hungary Son of Stephen Zápolya, Palatine of Hungary, and Hedwig of Cieszyn	Isabella of Poland; In late January to early February 1539: John Sigismund, King of Hungary and Prince of Transylvania (1540)	22 July 1540; Szászsebes, Eastern Hungarian Kingdom; Aged 53 Royal Basilica, Székesfehérvár, Eastern Hungarian Kingdom	Connection to the Árpád dynasty; Voivode of Transylvania (1510–1526); King of the Eastern Hungarian Kingdom

=== House of Habsburg (1526–1564) ===
Name Reign Coronation	Portrait	Arms	Birth Parentage	Marriage(s) Issue	Death Burial	Notes
House of Habsburg (1526–1564)
Ferdinand I 38th king of Hungary 17 December 1526 ┃ 25 July 1564 (37 years, 220 days) 3 November 1527; Székesfehérvár			10 March 1503; Alcalá de Henares, Crown of Castile Son of Philip I, King of Castile and Joanna of Castile	Anna of Hungary; 26 May 1521 fifteen children	25 July 1564; Vienna aged 61 St. Vitus Cathedral, Prague, Kingdom of Bohemia	Connections to the Árpád dynasty; Brother-in-law of King Louis II; Contested by King John I and John II; King of Royal Hungary

=== House of Zápolya (1540–1570) ===
Name Reign Coronation	Portrait	Arms	Birth Parentage	Marriage(s) Issue	Death Burial	Notes
House of Zápolya (1540–1570)
John II; John Sigismund; Hungarian: II. János; 39th king of Hungary First reign 13 September 1540 ┃ 19 July 1551 (10 years, 310 days) Second reign 25 November 1556 ┃ 16 August 1570 (13 years, 264 days) Never crowned			7 July 1540; Buda, Eastern Hungarian Kingdom Son of John I of Hungary, and Isabella of Poland	Unmarried	14 March 1571; Gyulafehérvár, Principality of Transylvania; Aged 30–31 St. Michael's Cathedral, Gyulafehérvár, Principality of Transylvania	First Prince of Transylvania (1570–1571)

The Habsburgs tried several times to unite all Hungary under their rule, but the Ottoman Empire prevented that by supporting the Eastern Hungarian Kingdom. King John I died in 1540, the Habsburg forces besieged Buda the Hungarian capital in 1541, Sultan Suleiman led a relief force and defeated the Habsburgs, the Ottomans captured the city by a trick during the Siege of Buda and the south central and central areas of the kingdom came under the authority of the Ottoman Empire, therefore Hungary was divided into three parts. The north-western rim of the Hungarian kingdom remained unconquered and recognised members of the House of Habsburg as Kings of Hungary, giving it the name "Royal Hungary". The Eastern Hungarian Kingdom is the predecessor of the Principality of Transylvania, which was established by the Treaty of Speyer in 1570 and the Eastern Hungarian King became the first Prince of Transylvania. The Principality of Transylvania was a semi-independent state, and a vassal state of the Ottoman Empire, it continued to be part of the Kingdom of Hungary in the sense of public law, John Sigismund's possessions belonged to the Holy Crown of Hungary, and was a symbol of the survival of Hungarian statehood.

=== House of Habsburg (1564–1637) ===
Name Reign Coronation	Portrait	Arms	Birth Parentage	Marriage(s) Issue	Death Burial	Notes
House of Habsburg (1564–1780)
Maximilian; 40th king of Hungary 26 July 1564 ┃ 12 October 1576 (12 years, 78 days) 8 September 1563; Pozsony			31 July 1527; Vienna Son of Ferdinand I, Holy Roman Emperor and King of Hungary and Anna of Hungary	Maria of Spain; 13 September 1548; Valladolid fifteen children	12 October 1576; Regensburg aged 49 St. Vitus Cathedral, Prague, Kingdom of Bohemia	Son of Ferdinand I, grandson of Vladislaus II; Contested by John II until 1570
Rudolph; 41st king of Hungary 12 October 1576 ┃ 26 June 1608 (31 years, 257 days) 25 September 1572; Pozsony			18 July 1552; Vienna Son of Maximilian (II), Holy Roman Emperor and King of Hungary and Maria of Spain	Unmarried	20 January 1612; Prague aged 59 St. Vitus Cathedral, Prague, Kingdom of Bohemia	Son of Maximilian
Matthias II; 42nd king of Hungary 26 June 1608 ┃ 20 March 1619 (10 years, 267 days) 19 November 1608; Pozsony			24 February 1557; Vienna Son of Maximilian (II), Holy Roman Emperor and King of Hungary and Maria of Spain	Anna of Tyrol; 4 December 1611; Vienna no issue	20 March 1619; Vienna aged 62 Capuchin Crypt, Vienna, Archduchy of Austria	Son of Maximilian and younger brother of Rudolph
Ferdinand II; 43rd king of Hungary 20 March 1619 ┃ 15 February 1637 (17 years, 331 days) 1 July 1618; Pozsony			9 July 1578; Graz Son of Charles II, Archduke of Austria and Maria Anna of Bavaria	1st marriage Maria Anna of Bavaria; 23 April 1600; Graz seven children 2nd marriage Eleonora of Mantua; 2 February 1622; Innsbruck no issue	15 February 1637; Vienna aged 58 Mausoleum of Ferdinand II, Graz, Duchy of Styria	Grandson of Ferdinand I and cousin of Rudolph and Matthias II

=== House of Bethlen (1620–1621) ===
Name Reign Coronation	Portrait	Arms	Birth Parentage	Marriage(s) Issue	Death Burial	Notes
House of Bethlen (1620–1621)
Gabriel; Hungarian: Bethlen Gábor; Anti-king 25 August 1620 ┃ 31 December 1621 (1 year, 128 days) Never crowned			15 November 1580; Marosillye Son of Farkas Bethlen de Iktár and Druzsiána Lázár de Szárhegy	Catherine of Brandenburg; 2 March 1626 no issue	15 November 1629; Gyulafehérvár, Principality of Transylvania; Aged 37 St. Michael's Cathedral, Gyulafehérvár, Principality of Transylvania	Elected in Besztercebánya; Contested by Ferdinand II

=== House of Habsburg (1637–1780) ===
Name Reign Coronation	Portrait	Arms	Birth Parentage	Marriage(s) Issue	Death Burial	Notes
House of Habsburg (1564–1780)
Ferdinand III; 44th king of Hungary 15 February 1637 ┃ 2 April 1657 (20 years, 47 days) 8 December 1625; Sopron			13 July 1608; Graz Son of Ferdinand II, Holy Roman Emperor and King of Hungary and Maria Anna of Bavaria	1st marriage Maria Anna of Spain; 20 February 1631; Vienna six children 2nd marriage Maria Leopoldine of Austria; 2 July 1648; Linz one child 3rd marriage Eleonora of Nevers; 30 April 1651; Wiener Neustadt four children	2 April 1657; Vienna aged 48 Capuchin Crypt, Vienna, Archduchy of Austria	Son of Ferdinand II
Ferdinand IV; 45th king of Hungary 16 June 1647 ┃ 9 July 1654 (7 years, 23 days); Junior king 16 June 1647; Pozsony			8 September 1633; Vienna Son of Ferdinand III, Holy Roman Emperor and King of Hungary and Maria Anna of Spain	Unmarried	9 July 1654; Vienna aged 20 Capuchin Crypt, Vienna, Archduchy of Austria	Son and co-ruler of Ferdinand III
Leopold I 46th king of Hungary 2 April 1657 ┃ 5 May 1705 (48 years, 33 days) 27 June 1655; Pozsony			9 June 1640; Vienna Son of Ferdinand III, Holy Roman Emperor and King of Hungary and Maria Anna of Spain	1st marriage Margaret Theresa of Spain; 12 December 1666; Vienna four children 2nd marriage Claudia Felicitas of Austria; 15 October 1673; Graz two children 3rd marriage Eleonor Magdalene of Neuburg; 14 December 1676; Passau ten children	5 May 1705; Vienna aged 64 Capuchin Crypt, Vienna, Archduchy of Austria	Son of Ferdinand III
Joseph I 47th king of Hungary 5 May 1705 ┃ 17 April 1711 (5 years, 347 days) 9 December 1687; Pozsony			26 July 1678; Vienna Son of Leopold I, Holy Roman Emperor and King of Hungary and Eleonor Magdalene of Neuburg	Wilhelmine Amalia of Brunswick-Lüneburg; 24 February 1699; Vienna three children	17 April 1711; Vienna aged 32 Capuchin Crypt, Vienna, Archduchy of Austria	Son of Leopold I
Charles III; 48th king of Hungary 17 April 1711 ┃ 20 October 1740 (29 years, 186 days) 22 May 1712; Pozsony			1 October 1685; Vienna Son of Leopold I, Holy Roman Emperor and King of Hungary and Eleonor Magdalene of Neuburg	Elisabeth Christine of Brunswick-Wolfenbüttel; 1 August 1708; Barcelona four children	20 October 1740; Vienna aged 55 Capuchin Crypt, Vienna, Archduchy of Austria	Son of Leopold I and younger brother of Joseph I
Maria Theresa; 49th "king" of Hungary 20 October 1740 ┃ 29 November 1780 (40 years, 40 days) 25 June 1741; Pozsony			13 May 1717; Vienna Daughter of Charles III (VI), Holy Roman Emperor and King of Hungary and Elisabeth Christine of Brunswick-Wolfenbüttel	Francis Stephen of Lorraine; 12 February 1736; Vienna sixteen children	29 November 1780; Vienna aged 63 Capuchin Crypt, Vienna, Archduchy of Austria	Daughter of Charles III

=== House of Habsburg-Lorraine (1780–1918) ===
Name Reign Coronation	Portrait	Arms	Birth Parentage	Marriage(s) Issue	Death Burial	Notes
House of Habsburg-Lorraine (1780–1918)
Joseph II; The Hat King; 50th king of Hungary 29 November 1780 ┃ 20 February 1790 (9 years, 283 days) Never crowned			13 March 1741; Vienna Son of Francis I, Holy Roman Emperor and Queen Maria Theresa	1st marriage Isabella of Parma; 6 October 1760; Vienna two children 2nd marriage Maria Josepha of Bavaria; 13 January 1765; Vienna no issue	20 February 1790; Vienna aged 48 Capuchin Crypt, Vienna, Archduchy of Austria	Son of Maria Theresa and Francis I, Holy Roman Emperor
Leopold II; 51st king of Hungary 20 February 1790 ┃ 1 March 1792 (2 years, 10 days) 15 November 1790; Pozsony			5 May 1747; Vienna Son of Francis I, Holy Roman Emperor and Queen Maria Theresa	Maria Luisa of Spain; 5 August 1765; Innsbruck sixteen children	1 March 1792; Vienna aged 44 Capuchin Crypt, Vienna, Archduchy of Austria	Son of Maria Theresa, younger brother of Joseph II
Francis I 52nd king of Hungary 1 March 1792 ┃ 2 March 1835 (43 years, 1 days) 6 June 1792; Buda			12 February 1768; Florence Son of Leopold II, Holy Roman Emperor and King of Hungary and Maria Luisa of Spain	1st marriage Elisabeth of Württemberg one child 2nd marriage Maria Theresa of Naples and Sicily twelve children 3rd marriage Maria Ludovika of Austria-Este no issue 4th marriage Caroline Augusta of Bavaria no issue	2 March 1835; Vienna aged 67 Capuchin Crypt, Vienna, Archduchy of Austria	Son of Leopold II
Ferdinand V The Benign; 53rd king of Hungary 2 March 1835 ┃ 2 December 1848 (13 years, 275 days) 28 September 1830; Pozsony			19 April 1793; Vienna Son of Francis II, Holy Roman Emperor and King of Hungary and Maria Theresa of Naples and Sicily	Maria Anna of Savoy; 27 February 1831; Vienna no issue	29 June 1875; Prague aged 82 Capuchin Crypt, Vienna, Archduchy of Austria	Son of Francis I
Franz Joseph I 54th king of Hungary 2 December 1848 ┃ 21 November 1916 (67 years, 354 days) 8 June 1867; Buda			18 August 1830; Vienna Son of Archduke Franz Karl of Austria and Princess Sophie of Bavaria	Elisabeth of Bavaria; 24 April 1854; Vienna four children	21 November 1916; Vienna aged 86 Capuchin Crypt, Vienna, Archduchy of Austria	Nephew of Ferdinand V, grandson of Francis I
Charles IV; Blessed Charles; 55th king of Hungary 21 November 1916 ┃ 16 November 1918 (1 year, 360 days) 30 December 1916; Budapest			17 August 1887; Persenbeug-Gottsdorf Son of Archduke Otto of Austria and Princess Maria Josepha of Saxony	Zita of Bourbon-Parma; 21 October 1911; Schwarzau eight children	1 April 1922; Funchal aged 34 Church of Our Lady, Funchal, Portugal	Great-nephew of Francis Joseph I, second great grandson of Francis I

== Family tree ==
Ügyek
Álmos
Árpád
Jutotzas	Zoltán
Fajsz	Taksony
(d. 997); Géza	Mihály
(d. 1038); Stephen I r. 1000-1038	Grimelda	[?] Sarolta	(d. 1044); Samuel r. 1041-1044	Vazul
Árpád	Aba
Peter r. 1038-1041, 1044-1046	Andrew I r. 1046-1060	(d. 1063); Béla I r. 1060-1063
Orseolo
(1053-1087); Solomon r. 1063-1074	(d. 1077); Géza I r. 1074-1077	(d. 1095); Ladislaus I r. 1077-1095
(d. 1116); Coloman r. 1096-1116	(d. 1127); Álmos
(b. 1110); Stephen II r. 1116-1131	(d. 1141); Béla II r. 1131-1141
(1130-1162); Géza II r. 1141-1162	(1131-1163); Ladislaus II r. 1162-1163	(d. 1165); Stephen IV r. 1163
(1147-1172); Stephen III r. 1162-1172	(d. 1196); Béla III r. 1172-1196
(1174-1204); Emeric r. 1196-1204	(d. 1235); Andrew II r. 1205-1235
(d. 1205); Ladislaus III r. 1204-1205	(1206-1270); Béla IV r. 1235-1270	(1235-1271); István
(d. 1302); Konstancia	(b. 1226); Anna	(1236-1271); Erzsébet	(1239-1272); Stephen V r. 1270-1272	(d. 1301); Andrew III r. 1290-1301
(1252-1308); Yuri	(1245-1285); Kunigunda	(1261-1312); Otto r. 1305-1307	(1257-1323); Mária	(1262-1290); Ladislaus IV r. 1272-1290
Wittelsbach
(d. 1364); Anastasia	(1271-1305); Václav	(1272-1299); Margherita	(1271-1295); Carlo Martello	(1294-1336); Giovanni	(1289-1341); Eleonora
(d. 1391); Uliana	(1289-1306); Wenceslaus r. 1301-1305	(1292–1330); Eliška	(d. 1352); Jeanne	(1288-1342); Charles I r. 1308-1342	(1324-1362); Luigi	(1304-1342); Pietro
Přemyslid	Anjou
(d. 1434); Aleksandra	(d. 1434); Jogaila	(1316-1378); Karl	(1311-1356); Margaretha	(1326-1382); Louis I r. 1342-1382	(1345-1386); Charles II r. 1385-1386	(1325-1375); Elenora
(d. 1447); Eufemia	(1368-1437); Sigismund r. 1387-1437	(1336-1404); Albrecht	(1371-1395); Mary r. 1382-1385, 1386-1395	(1358-1382); Alionor
Luxembourg
(d. 1477); Przemysław	(d. 1410); Johanna Sophie	(1380-1416); Fernando
(1469-1521); Jadwiga	(1409-1442); Elisabeth	(1397-1439); Albert r. 1437-1439	(1398-1479); Juan	(1396-1458); Alfonso
Habsburg
(1424-1444); Vladislaus I r. 1440-1444	(1427-1492); Kazimierz	(d. 1505); Elisabeth	(1440-1457); Ladislaus V r. 1444-1457	(1452-1516); Fernando	(1424-1494); Ferdinando
Jagiellon
(1467-1548); Zygmunt	(1456-1516); Vladislaus II r. 1490-1516	(1479-1555); Juana	(1443-1490); Matthias I r. 1458-1490	(1457-1508); Beatrice
Hunyadi
(1487-1540); John I r. 1526-1540	(1519-1559); Izabela	(1506-1526); Louis II r. 1516-1526	(1503-1547); Anna	(1503-1564); Ferdinand I r. 1526-1564
Zápolya	Habsburg
(1540-1571); John II r. 1540-1551, 1556-1570	(1527-1576); Maximilian r. 1564-1576	(1540-1590); Karl
(1552-1612); Rudolf r. 1576-1608	(1557-1619); Matthias II r. 1612-1619	(1578-1637); Ferdinand II r. 1619-1637
(1608-1657); Ferdinand III r. 1625-1657
(1633-1654); Ferdinand IV r. 1647-1654	(1640-1705); Leopold I r. 1655-1705
(1678-1711); Joseph I r. 1687-1711	(1685-1740); Charles III r. 1711-1740
(1717-1780); Maria Theresa r. 1740-1780
(1741-1790); Joseph II r. 1780-1790	(1747-1792); Leopold II r. 1790-1792
Habsburg- Lorraine
(1768-1835); Francis r. 1792-1835
(1793-1875); Ferdinand V r. 1835-1848	(1802-1878); Franz Karl
(1830-1916); Francis Joseph r. 1848-1916	(1833-1896); Karl Ludwig
(1865–1906); Otto
(1887-1922); Charles IV r. 1916-1918

== See also ==
- Family tree of Hungarian monarchs
- List of Hungarian royal consorts
- List of princes of Transylvania
- List of princesses consort of Transylvania
- List of palatines of Hungary
- List of regent-governors of Hungary
- List of heads of state of Hungary
- List of prime ministers of Hungary

== Sources ==
- MKI (2022). Kings and Saints - The Age of the Árpáds (PDF). Budapest, Székesfehérvár: Institute of Hungarian Research. ISBN 978-615-6117-65-6.
