= Partium =

Historical region in Hungary

Partium (from Latin partium, the genitive plural of pars "part, portion") or Részek (in Hungarian) was a historical and geographical region in the Kingdom of Hungary during the early modern and modern periods. It consisted of the eastern and northeastern parts of Hungary proper. (Note: During the early modern period, Hungary was divided and Transylvania, despite being part of the Lands of the Hungarian Crown, was recognized as a distinct polity. The reunification of Transylvania and "Hungary proper" happened in 1868.) At times, it included Miskolc and Kassa.

== History ==
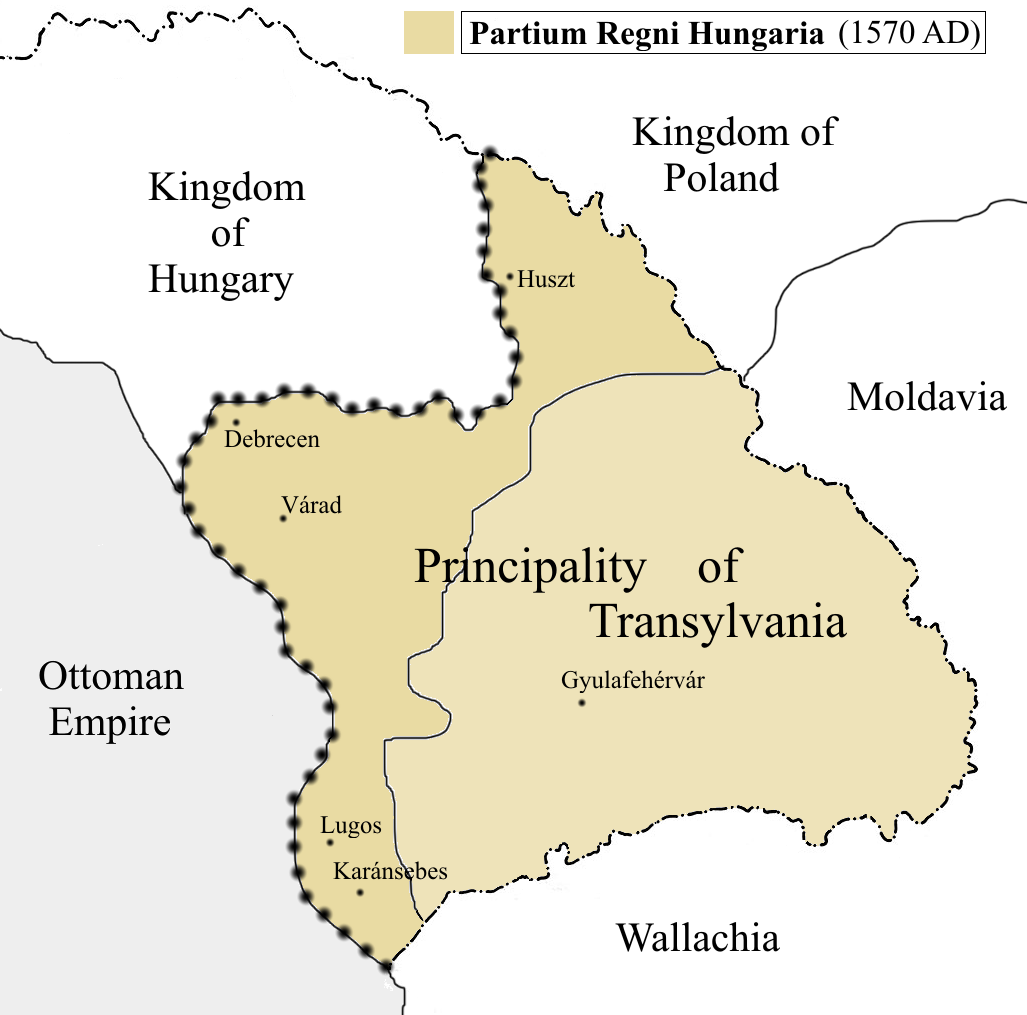
Partium, depicted in the darker colour, and the Principality of Transylvania, 1570

In 1526, after the Battle of Mohács, the Kingdom of Hungary was overrun by the Ottomans, but effectively split into 3 parts in 1541 when the Ottomans captured Buda. The Habsburgs got a foothold in the north and west (Royal Hungary), with the new capital Pressburg (Pozsony). King John I of Hungary from the Zápolya house, the former voivode of Transylvania and the wealthiest and the most powerful landlord after Mohács, secured the eastern part of the Kingdom (referred to as Eastern Hungarian Kingdom by Hungarian scholars) with the help of the Ottomans. On 29 February 1528, the sultan assented to an alliance with Zápolya and gave written assurance of his support.

From 1541 or 1542, the house of Zápolya also controlled the region that after 1571 became known as Partium.

In 1570, John II Sigismund Zápolya, son of John I Zápolya renounced his claim as King of Hungary (1540-1570) in favour of Maximilian II of Habsburg, who also claimed the title since 1563. Instead John II Sigismund Zápolya remained Prince of Transylvania between 1570 and 1571.

In 1570, by the Treaty of Speyer (Spires), John II Sigismund, John I's son, abdicated as king of Hungary, and a new dukedom was invented for him: "Joannes, serenissimi olim Joannis regis Hungariae, Dalmatiae, Croatiae etc. filius, Dei gratia princeps Transsylvaniae ac partium regni Hungariae" (John, son of the late most serene king John of Hungary, Dalmatia, Croatia, etc., by the grace of God prince of Transylvania and parts of the Kingdom of Hungary), from which derives the name Partium.

This treaty, like the earlier Nagyvárad accord, endorsed the principle of a united Hungary. Partium and Transylvania were entrusted to John II Sigismund, but under the title of imperial prince. As mentioned above, the Zápolya held Partium before, but the treaty allowed them to do this without fear that the Habsburgs would contest the house of Zápolya's lordship. In a sense, Zápolya traded title for territory.

The Eastern Hungarian Kingdom ceased to exist, and became simply the Principality of Transylvania. All rulings after 1570 as King of Hungary refer to the territory known as "Royal Hungary", and as Prince refer to the Principality of Transylvania which included Partium.

Principality of Transylvania under Gabriel Bethlen, including the seven Partium counties ceded to him at the Peace of Nikolsburg in 1621: Ugocsa, Bereg, Zemplén, Borsod, Szabolcs, Szatmár and Abaúj.

For some decades during the 17th century Partium was part of the Principality of Transylvania, and consequently a part of the Ottoman Empire. On 5 September 1619, the prince of Transylvania, Gabriel Bethlen, captured Kassa (now Košice) in Partium Abaúj County with the assistance of the future George I Rákóczi in another anti-Habsburg insurrection. By the Peace of Nikolsburg in 1621, the Habsburgs restored the religious toleration agreement of 1606 and recognized Transylvanian rule over seven stated Partium counties: Ugocsa, Bereg, Zemplén, Borsod, Szabolcs, Szatmár and Abaúj.

These were returned to Habsburg Royal Hungary at Bethlen's death in 1629, but were once again seized by Transylvanian prince George I Rákóczi in 1644 and formally ceded by Habsburg Royal Hungary to Transylvania at the Treaty of Linz (1645).

== Geographic extent ==
Initially, Partium consisted of the counties of Máramaros, Közép-Szolnok, Kraszna, and Bihar, Zaránd, Arad, Szörény as well as the Kővárvidék. These territories were ruled by Transylvania, but were not formally part of the Principality (later Grand Principality) of Transylvania, and so the name Partium was coined. Seven additional counties (Borsod, Abaúj, Zemplén, Szabolcs, Bereg, Ugocsa and Szatmár) were briefly ceded to Transylvania and thus the Partium between 1621-1629 and 1645-1648.

All of Transylvania was at the time under permanent threat of being overrun by both Habsburgs and Ottomans. After the disastrous Transylvanian intervention in the Deluge, Ottoman troops invaded Transylvania in 1658-1661. In this war, Transylvania lost many of its border regions: most of Szörény, Arad, Zaránd and Bihar counties, including the important city of Várad (Oradea), around which the Ottomans organised a new vilayet. During the Great Turkish War, as Ottoman occupied Hungary was conquered by the Habsburgs, the principality was also absorbed into the Habsburg monarchy in 1687 (de facto) / 1699 (by treaty with the Ottomans).

The Principality of Transylvania continued as a separate entity from the Kingdom of Hungary within the Habsburg domain. The status of the Partium was disputed between Hungary and Transylvania, taxed by the former but administered by the latter. This situation was resolved on December 31, 1732, when Máramaros and most of Zaránd county (merged to Arad county) was fully granted to Hungary, while Közép-Szolnok, Kraszna counties, Kővárvidék and the eastern rump of Zaránd was granted to Transylvania. Between 1732 and 1848 this smaller area was continued to be described as Transylvania. The Hungarian nobility demanded the return of the Partium multiple times (1741, 1792, 1836), but it was never enacted until the Revolution of 1848. On May 29, 1848 all of Transylvania, alongside the Partium was unified with Hungary. After the fall of the revolution, the Partium was again part of a separately administered Transylvania.

In 1867, at the Austro-Hungarian Compromise of 1867, the Partium territories were incorporated into the Transleithanian part of Austria-Hungary. (See comitatus system.)

== Present-day location ==
The flag and coat of arms of Partium voted by the Council for Autonomy in Partium (PAT) in 2015

With the dissolution of the Austro-Hungarian Empire at the end of World War I, Partium was split, under the terms of the 1920 Treaty of Trianon, among the successor states of the former Kingdom of Hungary: about 60% became part of Romania, about 20% went to Hungary, and another 20% to Czechoslovakia. The latter part, known as Carpathian Ruthenia, was ceded to the Soviet Union after World War II, becoming part of the Ukrainian SSR; since 1991 it has belonged to Ukraine.

The Romanian part roughly corresponds to the Crişana and partly Banat regions of Romania. The Hungarian part corresponds to the Hajdú-Bihar county, and small parts of the Szabolcs-Szatmár-Bereg and Békés counties of Hungary. The Ukrainian part corresponds to the Northern Maramureș region of the Zakarpattia Oblast, Ukraine.

In present-day Hungarian usage, Partium chiefly refers to the part of the region that lies in Romania.

== Autonomy initiatives ==
With the support of Hungarian People's Party of Transylvania, which advocates territorial autonomy for Partium, the Council for Autonomy in Partium was created in 2013. The Council approved a new flag for Partium in 2015 composed of a Patriarchal cross and Árpád stripes, both traditional symbols of the Hungarian nation featured on the coat of arms of Hungary.

== See also ==
- Székely Land
- Csángó Land
