= Țara Chioarului =

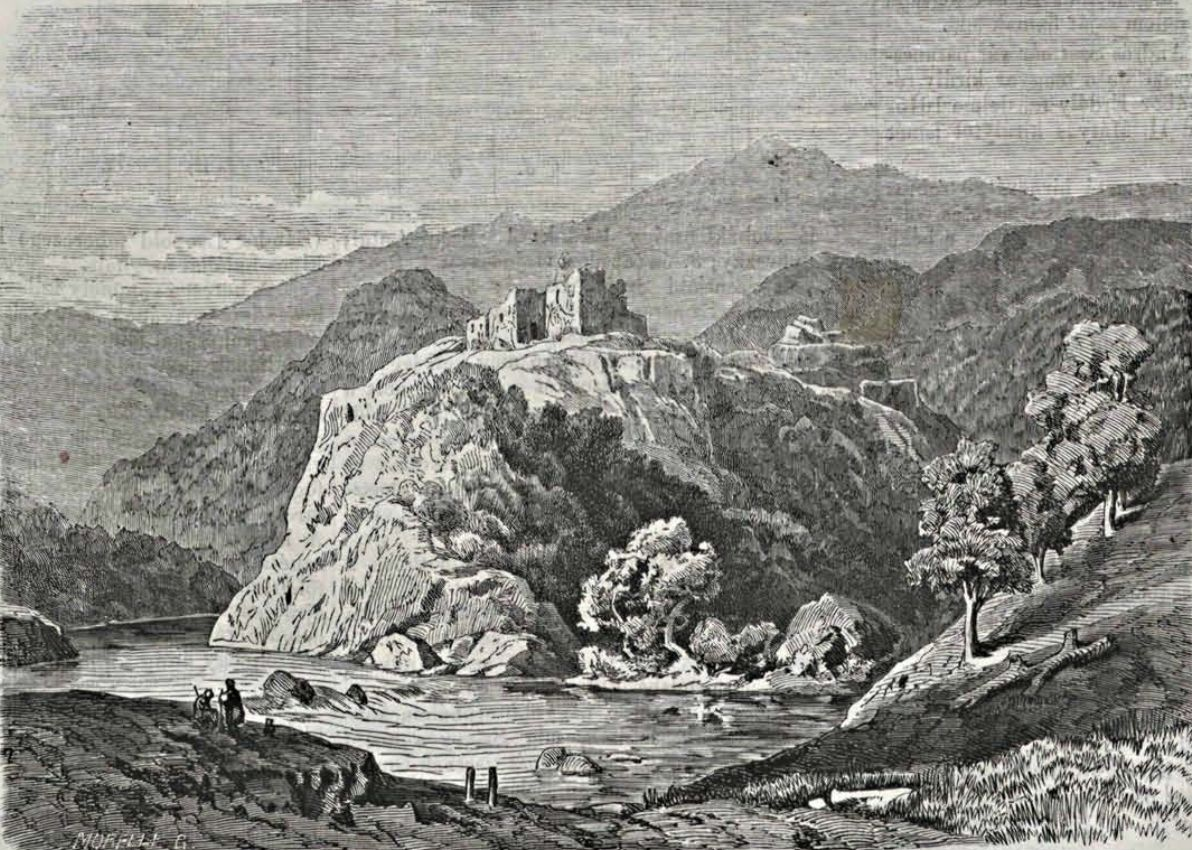
Kővár castle's ruins - Gusztáv Keleti's drawing, late nineteenth century

Țara Chioarului (Hungarian: Kővárvidék) is a historical region of Partium extending from the limits of Baia Mare domain to the North (traditionally known as Fisculaş) and those of Țara Lăpușului to the East, down to Someș river to the South and West.

From the 13th century until 1876 it was a domain within the Kingdom of Hungary centered around Chioar Castle (Hungarian: Kővár vára, Kővár meaning „Stone Castle” in Hungarian from where it draws its name in Romanian) built on a promontory of the Lăpuș river gorge. After the destruction of the citadel in 1718, the noble family Teleki, which owned most of the domain's land in the eighteenth century, bought the ruins and used the materials to build an edifice in Șomcuta Mare, marking the town as the new centre of the district. With the administrative restructuring of 1876 the district's territory was split between Szolnok-Doboka and Szatmár county. While no longer an administrative unit, Chioar/Kővár remains a distinct ethnographic sub-region of Transylvania in its broader definition.

== Geography ==
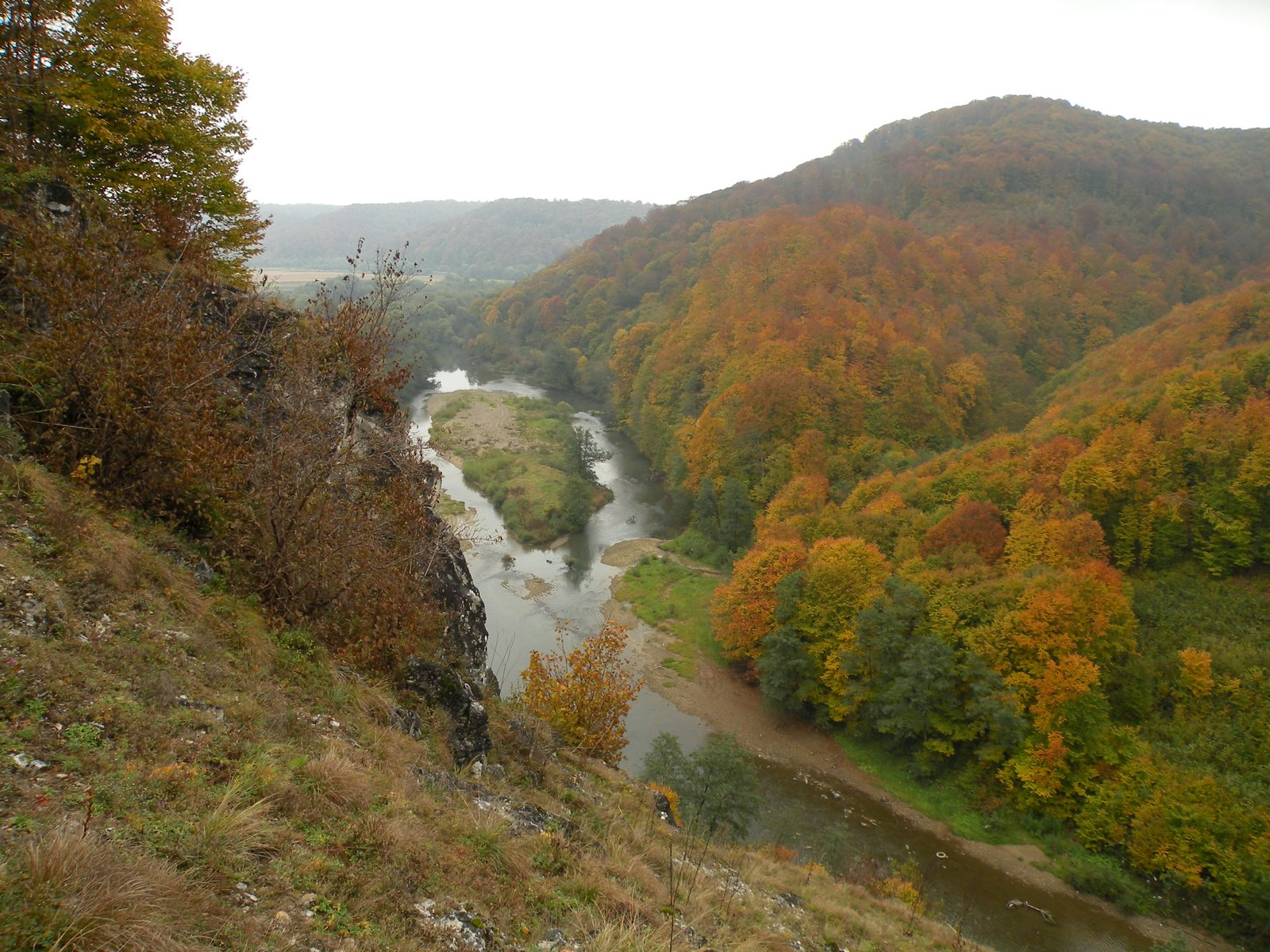
The beginning of Lăpuș Gorge, near the village of Răzoare, Maramureș

The area associated with Chioar Domain represents the lower part of Lăpuș river valley, starting from the river's gorge to its flow into Someș river. It forms a contiguous territorial system with Țara Lăpușului, overlapping the river's hydrographical basin.

The climate of the region is moderate temperate continental.

== History ==
The earliest mention of the area comes from the time of King Andrew III of Hungary who, in 1291, associated it with former co-regent King Stephen V of Hungary and the Guthkeled nobles. During the reign of Charles I the castle is mentioned under the name CHEEWAR. The castle and the domain were given to Drag and Balc of the House of Dragoș by Louis I of Hungary in the second half of the fourteenth century and it will remain in the possession of the family until the death of Gáspár Drágffy in 1556. The district then change hands between rulers, given its strategic position on the border of Transylvania proper and Partium, among them being John Zápolya, the Báthory family on a couple of occasions during their rule over Transylvania in the sixteenth century, and George I Rákóczi.

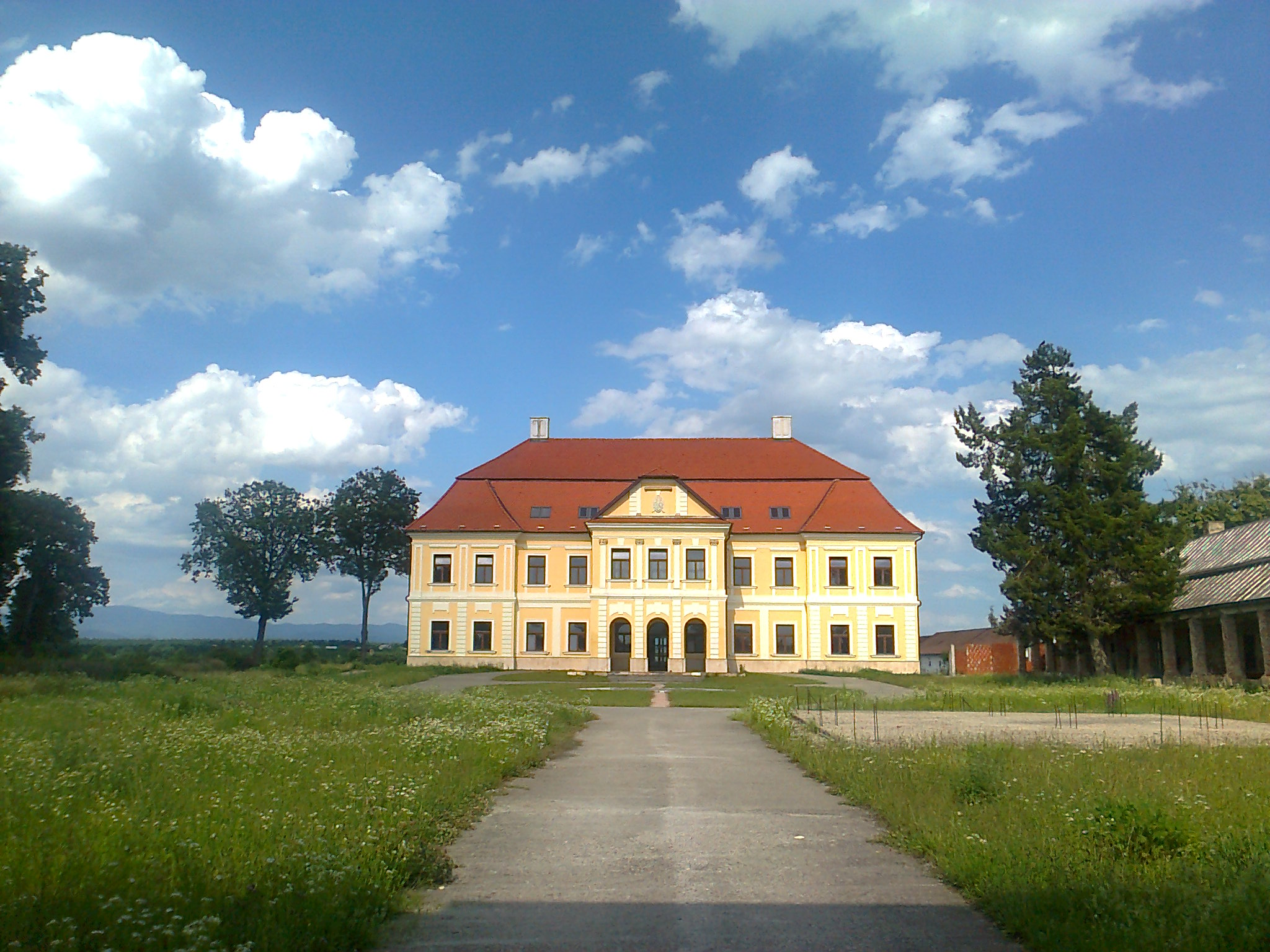
Teleki Castle in Satulung/Kővárhosszúfalu (Maramureș County, Romania)

Following the Battle of Vienna the district was part of the larger scene of battle between Habsburg troops and Kuruc. The castle was retaken by the Kuruc in 1703 and its commander, Mihály Teleki, joined their ranks along with most of the military personnel of the district, while few others joined the "lobonc", the pro-Habsburg faction. After the unsuccessful Rákóczi's War of Independence and the Tatar invasion of 1717 the castle was deemed obsolete in the new system of defence of the wider region and destroyed by setting fire to its powder arsenal and bombardment from the cannons of the Imperial general Jean-Louis de Bussy-Rabutin in 1718.

Teleki family bought the ruins from the Imperial authorities in the following year and used the stones and bricks to construct their manor in Coltău/Koltó and an administrative building in Șomcuta Mare.

The district continued to function even without its citadel until the introduction of a new system of counties in the Kingdom of Hungary in 1876 when it was split between Szolnok-Doboka and Szatmár county.

Szolnok-Doboka and Szatmár counties of the Kingdom of Hungary became part of Kingdom of Romania by Treaty of Trianon in 1920.
