= Hedwig of Cieszyn =

Polish princess

- Born: 1469
- Died: 6 April 1521; Trencsén Castle
- Buried: Szepeshely
- Noble family: House of Piast (by birth); House of Zápolya (by marriage)
- Spouse: Stephen Zápolya
- Issue: John Zápolya, King of Hungary; George Zápolya; Barbara, Queen consort of Poland; Magdalena Zápolya
- Father: Przemyslaus II, Duke of Cieszyn
- Mother: Anna of Warsaw

Hedwig of Cieszyn (Polish: Jadwiga cieszyńska, Hungarian: Hedvig tescheni hercegnő) (1469 – 6 April 1521) was a Polish princess. She was the only child of Przemysław II, Duke of Cieszyn by his wife Anna, daughter of Duke Bolesław IV of Warsaw.

== Life ==
After her father's death in 1477, eight-year-old Hedwig was placed under the guardianship of her cousin, Casimir II.

On 11 August 1483 she married the widower Stephen Zápolya, Lord of Trencsén (Trenčín). They had four children: János Zápolya (2 June 1487 – 22 July 1540), later King of Hungary; George Zápolya (ca. 1494 – 29 August 1526), killed in action at Mohács; Barbara Zápolya (1495 – 2 October 1515), Queen of Poland after her marriage to Sigismund I the Old; and Magdalena Zápolya (b. ca. 1499 – 1499), died young.

Stephen Zápolya died on 23 December 1499. Hedwig remained in Hungary, where she managed the huge property left behind by her late husband. She was also a generous supporter of the Carthusian monastery of Lapis Refugii in Spiš.

Hedwig died on 16 April 1521 in Trencsén Castle and was buried alongside her husband in the Zápolya family vault on the Szepes chapter house.
