= Barbara Zápolya =

Queen of Poland and Grand Duchess of Lithuania from 1512 to 1515

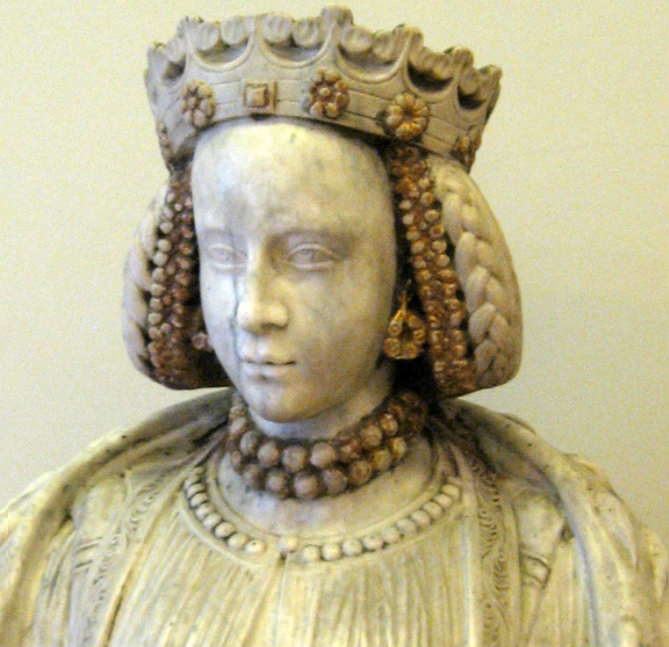
- Marble bust of Barbara Zápolya long thought to be of her husband's daughter-in-law, Barbara Radziwiłł

Queen consort of Poland Grand Duchess consort of Lithuania
- Tenure: 8 February 1512 – 2 October 1515
- Coronation: 8 February 1512; Wawel Cathedral
- Born: 1495; Trencsén, Kingdom of Hungary (most likely)
- Died: 2 October 1515 (aged 19–20); Kraków, Kingdom of Poland
- Burial: 18 October 1515; Wawel Cathedral, Kraków
- Spouse: Sigismund I of Poland (m. 1512)
- Issue: Hedwig, Electress of Bradenburg; Anna of Poland
- House: Zápolya
- Father: Stephen Zápolya
- Mother: Hedwig of Cieszyn

Barbara Zápolya (Hungarian: Szapolyai Borbála, Lithuanian: Barbora Zapojajietė, 1495–1515) was Queen of Poland and Grand Duchess of Lithuania as the first wife of Sigismund I the Old from 1512 to 1515. Marriage to Barbara represented an alliance between Sigismund and the House of Zápolya against the Habsburgs in succession disputes over the throne to the Kingdom of Hungary. The alliance was short-lived as the renewed Muscovite–Lithuanian War forced Sigismund to look for Habsburg allies. The marriage was loving, but short. Barbara was the mother of Hedwig, Electress of Brandenburg, but died soon after the birth of her second daughter Anna.

== Marriage plans ==
She was the daughter of Stephen Zápolya, Palatine of Hungary and Count of Szepes, and the Polish princess Hedwig of Cieszyn of the Piast dynasty. Barbara was a younger sister of John Zápolya, the future King of Hungary. The family was well known for their wealth: Stephen had more than 70 castles in Hungary. Her father died in 1499, leaving the family in care of Hedwig's cousin, Casimir II, Duke of Cieszyn. Barbara probably spent her childhood in the Trenčín Castle and the court of Anne of Foix-Candale, Queen of Bohemia and Hungary.

Sigismund I the Old was the fifth of six sons of the Polish King and Lithuanian Grand Duke Casimir IV Jagiellon. Not having any inheritance in either Poland or Lithuania, he lived in Buda, at the court of his elder brother King Vladislaus II of Hungary, in 1498–1501 and 1502–1506. At that time he became closer with the House of Zápolya. Sigismund mediated a dispute between his brother Vladislaus and the Zápolyas, who wanted to secure the throne of Hungary to John Zápolya by securing marriage between John and Vladislaus' first-born Anne of Hungary. Vladislaus refused, favoring the interests of Maximilian I, Holy Roman Emperor. The Hungarian nobles strongly opposed the increasing reach of the Habsburg dynasty and threatened to take up arms. The conflict lost its urgency when Vladislaus' son and heir Louis II of Hungary was born in July 1506.

In August 1506, Alexander Jagiellon died without leaving an heir. Sigismund was elected as King of Poland and Grand Duke of Lithuania and faced growing ambitions of the Habsburgs not only in Hungary and Bohemia, but also in the State of the Teutonic Order in Prussia. That forced him to look for anti-Habsburg allies and Zápolyas in Hungary were the strongest. A royal marriage would strengthen Zápolya position in any future succession disputes and would help keep Hungary out of the hands of the Habsburgs. It seems the plan was developed around 1510 by Jan Łaski, Grand Chancellor of the Crown, and Krzysztof Szydłowiecki, Marshal of the Court. Before deciding on Barbara, Sigismund also considered Catherine of Mecklenburg, but that plan was interrupted by renewed hostilities between Poland and Bogdan III the One-Eyed, Voivode of Moldavia.

== Wedding ==
In April 1511, Sigismund sent Piotr Tomicki as his envoy to Hungary. Tomicki informed King Vladislaus that his brother sought to wed a Hungarian noblewoman and asked for his assistance in locating a suitable candidate. Vladislaus' trusted physician, bribed by the Polish delegation, suggested Barbara Zápolya and Vladislaus agreed. The ruse worked to secure Vladislaus' approval for the marriage. The marriage treaty was signed on 2 December 1511. Barbara, escorted by her family and Polish nobles (Bishop Jan Lubrański, Krzysztof Szydłowiecki, Andrzej Krzycki), departed to Poland in January 1512. Maximilian I, Holy Roman Emperor, attempted to interrupt the wedding with a last-minute proposal for Sigismund to marry one of the daughters of Francesco II Gonzaga, Marquess of Mantua.

On 6 February 1512, Sigismund met Barbara in Łobzów, now a district of Kraków. That way 17-year-old Barbara and 45-year-old Sigismund entered Kraków together. The wedding and coronation ceremony took place on 8 February. Her dowry was 100,000 red złoty, which was a very large sum. Sigismund's youngest sister Elisabeth, who married three years later, brought only 20,000 złoty as her dowry. The celebrations, financed by a loan from Jan Boner, cost another 34,365 złoty. This showed not only the riches of the Zápolya family but also the importance of a royal wedding to their family. In exchange for the dowry, Barbara received the towns of Nowy Korczyn, Wiślica, Żarnowiec, Radom, Jedlnia, Kozienice, Chęciny, Stężyca, and others as well as income from custom taxes of several cities and an annual sum of 200 Hungarian florins from the Wieliczka Salt Mine.

== Queen of Poland and Grand Duchess of Lithuania ==
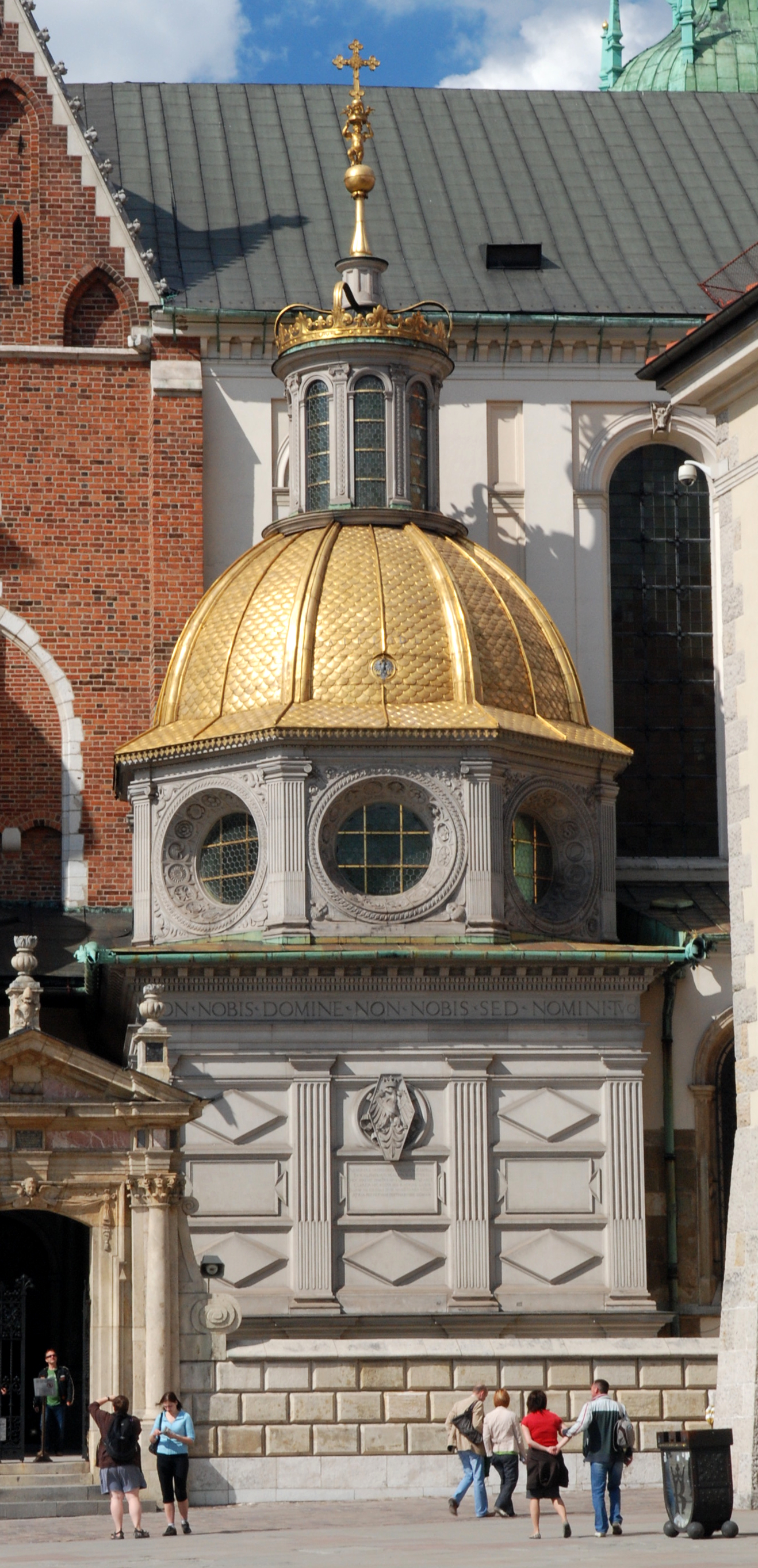
Sigismund's Chapel at Wawel Castle was originally constructed for Barbara Zápolya

Despite the age difference, the marriage was happy. The couple traveled together, even when Barbara was late in her pregnancy. Their first daughter Hedwig was born on 15 March 1513 in Poznań. After two months, Sigismund and Barbara departed towards Vilnius to attend to the renewed war with the Grand Duchy of Moscow. The two-month-old Hedwig was sent to Kraków. The couple separated for the first time in July–September 1514 when Sigismund organized the army against Moscow. Sigismund returned to his wife in Vilnius after the victory in the Battle of Orsha. In February 1515, the couple returned to Kraków where Barbara was reunited with her daughter after almost two years. Barbara, pregnant with her second child, remained in Kraków while Sigismund traveled to Bratislava and then Vienna from March to August 1515. This was the second time that the couple separated.

During that time, they exchanged frequent letters (20 letters by Sigismund and only two letters by Barbara survive) expressing their warm feelings for each other. Sigismund particularly expressed his affection for Barbara and concern for her well-being, reminding her to take good care of her health and encouraging her to keep up her spirits. Contemporary sources almost universally praised Barbara for her virtues. Marcin Bielski wrote of her devotion to God, obedience to husband, kindheartedness and generosity to paupers. Marcin Kromer even attributed the victory at Orsha to her Catholic piety and devotion, while Justus Ludwik Decjusz did not doubt that Barbara would join ranks of saints in the heaven.

Despite her husband's affection and public support, Barbara did not have a strong political influence. For example, her mother and brother urged her to prevent Piotr Tomicki, a known sympathizer with the Habsburgs, from becoming Bishop of Przemyśl and Vice-Chancellor of the Crown. Tomicki was promoted to the posts regardless and, after learning of Zápolyas' interference, became an even stronger supporter of the Habsburgs. Marriage to Barbara also did not stop Sigismund from supporting the wedding between Louis II of Hungary and Maria of Austria, granddaughter of Maximilian I, Holy Roman Emperor. Sigismund's shift to pro-Habsburg policies was caused by the war with the Grand Duchy of Moscow – Sigismund did not feel confident enough to fight two strong enemies and sought an alliance with the Emperor.

Their second daughter Anna was born on 1 July 1515. After the childbirth, Barbara became ill. It is unclear if it was childbed fever or some other disease. On 1 October 1515, Barbara suffered what was described as apoplexy, though it is impossible to determine the actual cause. She died the next day and was buried at Wawel Cathedral. In 1517, Sigismund ordered the construction of the Sigismund's Chapel at the cathedral. Barbara and her daughter Anna, who died at the age of 5, were reburied in the completed chapel on 13 June 1533.

== Ancestors ==
Ancestors of Barbara Zápolya

4. László Zápolya
2. Stephen Zápolya
5. Dorothea
1. Barbara Zápolya
24. Przemyslaus I Noszak, Duke of Cieszyn
12. Boleslaus I, Duke of Cieszyn
25. Elisabeth of Bytom
6. Przemyslaus II, Duke of Cieszyn
26. Siemowit IV, Duke of Masovia
13. Euphemia of Masovia
27. Alexandra of Lithuania
3. Hedwig of Cieszyn
28. Bolesław III of Warsaw
14. Bolesław IV of Warsaw
29. Anna of Halshany
7. Anna of Warsaw
30. Aleksandras Olelka
15. Barbara Aleksandrówna
31. Anastasia Vasilievna

Barbara Zápolya House of Zápolya Born: 1495 Died: 2 October 1515
Royal titles
Preceded by Helena of Moscow	Queen consort of Poland; Grand Duchess consort of Lithuania; 1512–1515	Succeeded by Bona Sforza
