= Stephen Zápolya =

Palatine of the Kingdom of Hungary (1492–1499)

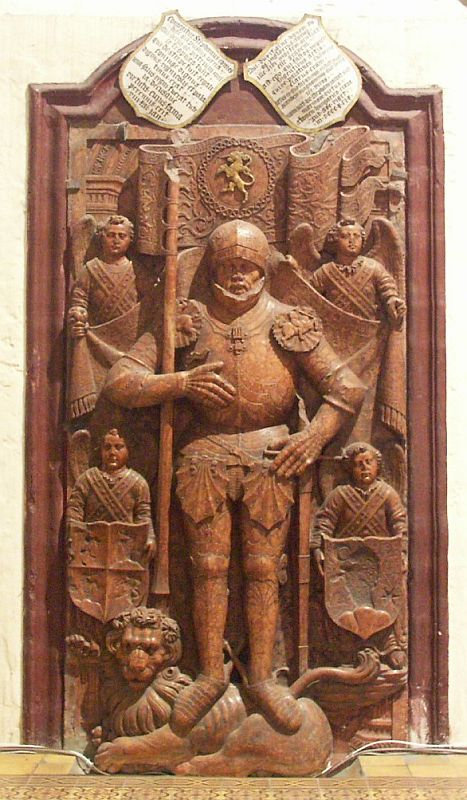
Tomb of Stephen Zápolya

Stephen Zápolya (Hungarian: Szapolyai István; died on 23 December 1499), was Palatine of the Kingdom of Hungary between 1492 and 1499.

He married Polish princess Hedwig of Cieszyn on 11 August 1483 (his second marriage), by whom he had four children:

- János Zápolya (2 June 1487 – 22 July 1540), later King of Hungary;
- George Zápolya (ca. 1494 – 29 August 1526), killed in action at Mohács;
- Barbara Zápolya (1495 – 2 October 1515), queen consort of Poland after her marriage to Sigismund I the Old;
- Magdalena Zápolya (b. ca. 1499 – 1499), died young.

He was buried in the Zápolya family vault on the Szepes chapter house.

== Sources ==
- C. Tóth, Norbert; Horváth, Richárd; Neumann, Tibor; Pálosfalvi, Tamás (2016). Magyarország világi archontológiája, 1458–1526, I. Főpapok és bárók [Secular Archontology of Hungary, 1458–1526, Volume I: Prelates and Barons] (in Hungarian). MTA Bölcsészettudományi Kutatóközpont Történettudományi Intézete. ISBN 978-963-4160-35-9.
- Engel, Pál (2001). The Realm of St Stephen: A History of Medieval Hungary, 895–1526. I.B. Tauris Publishers. ISBN 1-86064-061-3.
- Markó, László (2006). A magyar állam főméltóságai Szent Istvántól napjainkig: Életrajzi Lexikon [Great Officers of State in Hungary from King Saint Stephen to Our Days: A Biographical Encyclopedia] (in Hungarian). Helikon Kiadó. ISBN 963-547-085-1.
- Kubinyi, András (2008). Matthias Rex. Balassi Kiadó. ISBN 978-963-506-767-1.
- Nagy, Gábor (2008). "Szapolyai István és János alakja Isthvánffi Miklós Historiaejában [The personalities of Stephen and John Zápolya in Miklós Isthvánffi's Historiae]" (PDF). Publicationes Universitatis Miskolcinensis, Sectio Philosophica (in Hungarian). 13 (3). Miskolci Egyetem: 267–294. ISSN 1219-5448.
- Neumann, Tibor (2012). "Régi genealógiai legendák nyomában. Szapolyai István nádor házasságai, leányai és leánytestvérei [In the Footsteps of Old Genealogical Legends. The Marriages, Daughters and Sisters of Palatine Stephen Zápolya]". In Mikó, Gábor; Péterfi, Bence; Vadas, András (eds.). Tiszteletkör: Történeti tanulmányok Draskóczy István egyetemi tanár 60. születésnapjára (in Hungarian). Eötvös Loránd University. pp. 431–438. ISBN 978-963-312-095-8.
- Neumann, Tibor (2014). "A gróf és a herceg magánháborúja (Szapolyai István és Corvin János harca a liptói hercegségért) [Private War between the Count and the Duke (The Struggle of István Szapolyai and János Corvinus for the Duchy of Liptó)]". Századok (in Hungarian). 148 (2). Magyar Történelmi Társulat: 387–426. ISSN 0039-8098.
- Neumann, Tibor (2020). "Két nádor és egy vajda, avagy a Szapolyaiak útja a királyi trónig [Two Palatines and one Voivode: or, the Szapolyais' Road to the Hungarian Throne]". In Fodor, Pál; Varga, Szabolcs (eds.). Egy elfeledett magyar királyi dinasztia: A Szapolyaiak (in Hungarian). MTA Bölcsészettudományi Kutatóközpont. pp. 13–47. ISBN 978-963-416-220-9.

Stephen House of Zápolya Born: ? Died: 23 December 1499
Political offices
Vacant Title last held by Emeric Zápolya	Palatine of Hungary; 1492–1499	Succeeded by Peter Geréb
