= Cathedral Basilica of St. Mary, Oradea =

Cathedral Basilica of St. Mary
- Catedrala romano-catolică Adormirea Maicii Domnului; Nagyboldogasszony székesegyház
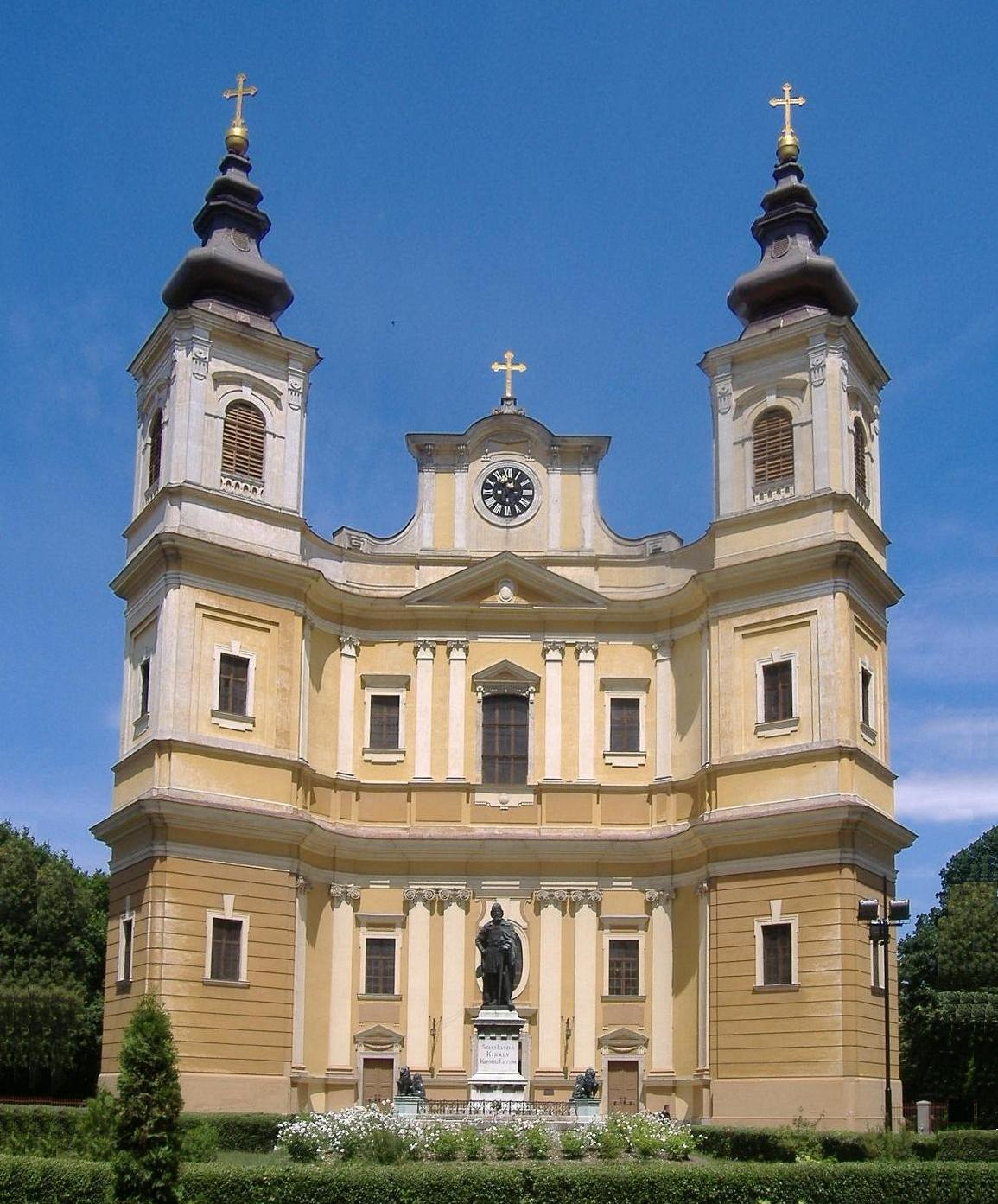
- Cathedral Basilica of St. Mary
- 47.0689°N 21.9320°E
- Location: Strada Șirul Canonicilor, Nr. 2, Oradea
- Country: Romania
- Denomination: Roman Catholic Church
- Website: varad.org

History
- Founded: 1752–1780

The Cathedral Basilica of St. Mary (Romanian: Catedrala romano-catolică Adormirea Maicii Domnului; Hungarian: nagyváradi Nagyboldogasszony székesegyház) also called the Catholic Cathedral of the Assumption, is the cathedral church of the Latin Diocese of Oradea Mare. It is located at 2 Șirul Canonicilor Street, Oradea, Romania.

The basilica was built between 1752 and 1780, and was designed by Italian architect Giovanni Battista Ricca (1691-1757). After the death of the first architect, construction was completed by the Viennese Franz Anton Hillebrandt and the church was adorned with baroque decorations of Austria.

== See also ==
- Roman Catholicism in Romania
