= Zápolya family =

Hungarian noble family

Zápolya family Szapolyai-család
- Hungarian noble family
- Country: Hungary; Poland
- Founded: 14th century
- Current head: None, extinct
- Final ruler: John Sigismund Zápolya
- Titles: Prince of Transylvania (1570–1571); King of Hungary (contested) (1526–1570); Voivode of Transylvania (1510–1526); Palatine of Hungary (1486–1487; 1492–1499); Ban of Croatia and Slavonia (1464–1465)
- Dissolution: 14 March 1571
- Italic is used for non-hereditary titles

The Szapolyai or Zápolya family was a noble family in the Kingdom of Hungary in the second half of the 15th century and in the early 16th century. A member of the family, John Szapolyai, was King of Hungary between 1526 and 1540, but he only ruled the central and eastern parts of the kingdom, because many Hungarian lords and prelates supported his opponent, Ferdinand of Habsburg.

== Origins ==
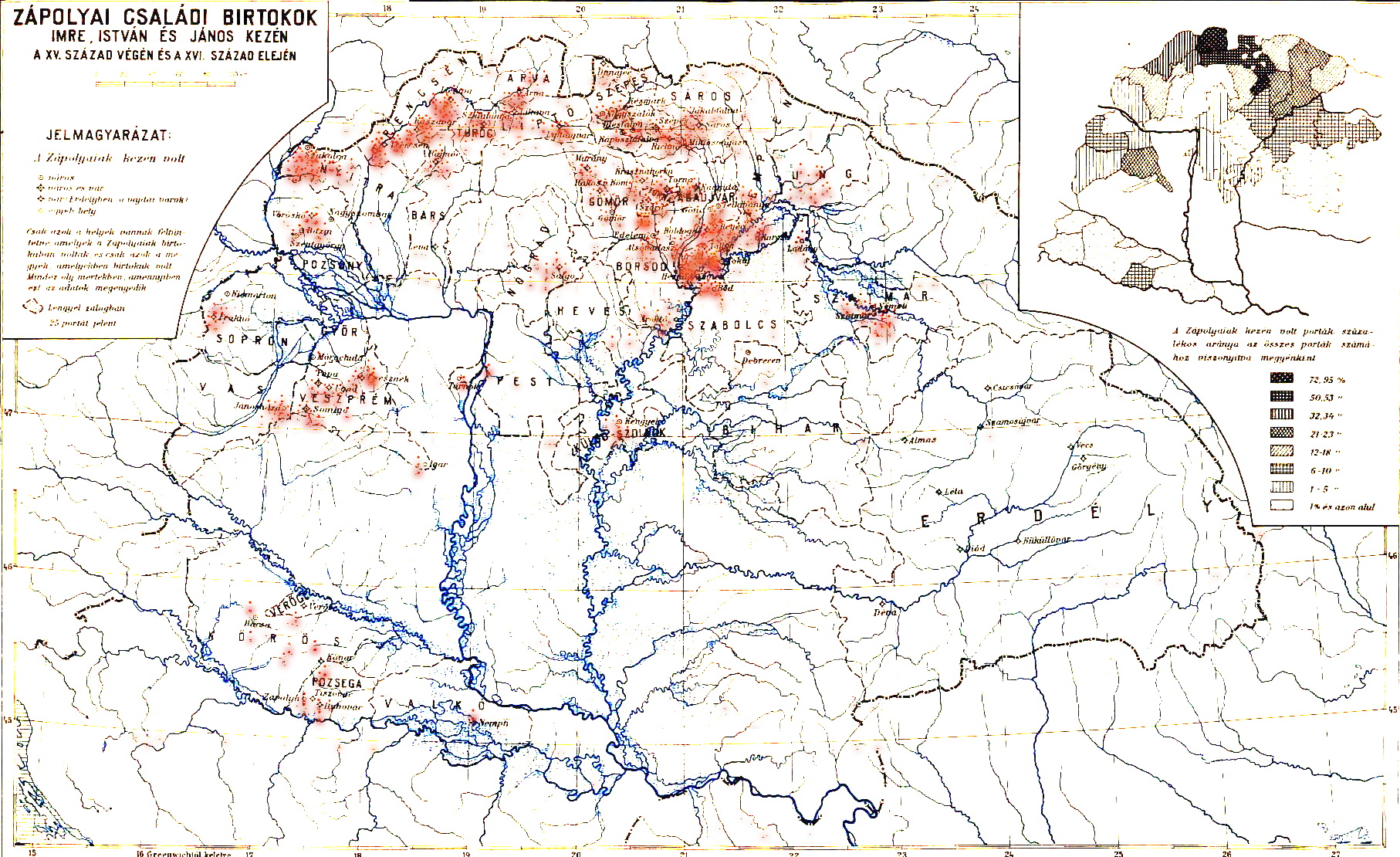
Map of the estates of the Zápolya family by Bálint Hóman

The first known member of the family was one Ladislaus Vajdafi Szapolyai, who was a Slavonian nobleman with estates in former Požega County. Most notably the today small eponymous village Zapolje in Rešetari municipality, Brod-Posavina county.

His eldest son, Emeric, was the first member of the family to achieve the status of "true baron of the realm" when Matthias Corvinus, King of Hungary, appointed him high treasurer in 1459 or 1460. The sudden emergence of Emeric and his two brothers – Nicholas and Stephen – during Matthias Corvinus's reign gave rise to scholarly theories about their kinship with the royal Hunyadi family. The joint appearance of the Szapolyai, Hunyadi and Szilágyi coat-of-arms in certain places also support this theory, taking into account that Matthias Corvinus's mother was Elizabeth Szilágyi. The Szapolyai coat-of-arms (which depicted a wolf) appears together with the Hunyadi coat-of-arms on the tomb of Matthias Corvinus's father, John Hunyadi, and with the Hunyadi and Szilágyi coat-of-arms in the Dominican monastery in Buda and on a well in Matthias Corvinus's summer palace in Visegrád. According to one theory, John Hunyadi's mother was born to the Szapolyai family; according to a concurring scholarly view, Emeric Szapolyai was Matthias Corvinus's half-brother. None of the theories can be proven, because no member of the Szapolyai family referred to his kinship with the Hunyadis.

== Notable members ==
- Emeric Zápolya
- Stephen Zápolya
- George Zápolya
- Barbara Zápolya, Queen of Poland
- John Zápolya, King of Hungary
- John Sigismund Zápolya, King of Hungary and Prince of Transylvania

== See also ==
- List of titled noble families in the Kingdom of Hungary

== Sources ==
- E. Kovács, Péter (1990). Matthias Corvinus (in Hungarian). Officina Nova. ISBN 963-7835-49-0.
- Engel, Pál (2001). The Realm of St Stephen: A History of Medieval Hungary, 895–1526. I.B. Tauris Publishers. ISBN 1-86064-061-3.
- Kubinyi, András (2008). Matthias Rex. Balassi Kiadó. ISBN 978-963-506-767-1.
- Neumann, Tibor (2007). "Péter püspök és rokonsága. Az első Szapolyaiak [Bishop Peter and his Family. The first Szapolyais]". In Makk, Ferenc; Piti, Ferenc (eds.). Acta Universitatis Szegediensis. Acta Historica (in Hungarian). MTA-SZTE-MOL Magyar Medievisztikai Kutatócsoport. pp. 59–70.
- Neumann, Tibor (2020). "Két nádor és egy vajda, avagy a Szapolyaiak útja a királyi trónig [Two Palatines and one Voivode: or, the Szapolyais' Road to the Hungarian Throne]". In Fodor, Pál; Varga, Szabolcs (eds.). Egy elfeledett magyar királyi dinasztia: A Szapolyaiak (in Hungarian). MTA Bölcsészettudományi Kutatóközpont. pp. 13–47. ISBN 978-963-416-220-9.
