= John Zápolya =

King of Hungary from 1526 to 1540

John I
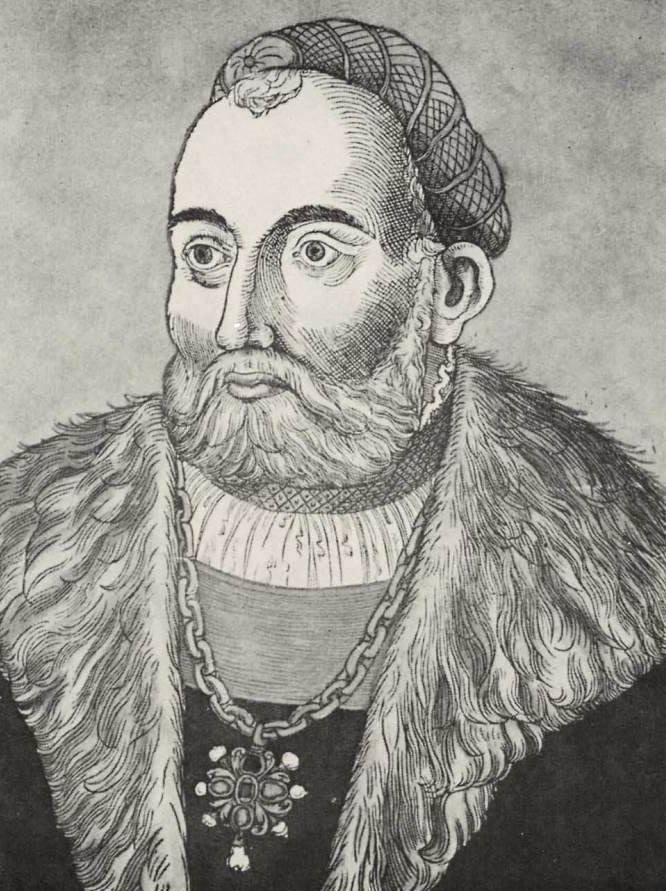
- Engraving by Erhard Schön

King of Hungary and Croatia Contested by Ferdinand I
- Reign: 1526–1540
- Coronation: 11 November 1526
- Predecessor: Louis II
- Successor: Ferdinand I John II Sigismund Zápolya
- Born: 1487; Szepesváralja, Kingdom of Hungary (now Spišské Podhradie, Slovakia)
- Died: 22 July 1540 (aged 52–53); Szászsebes, Kingdom of Hungary (now Sebeș, Romania)
- Burial: Székesfehérvár Basilica
- Spouse: Isabella Jagiellon
- Issue: John II Sigismund Zápolya
- House: House of Zápolya
- Father: Stephen Zápolya
- Mother: Hedwig of Cieszyn
- Religion: Roman Catholic
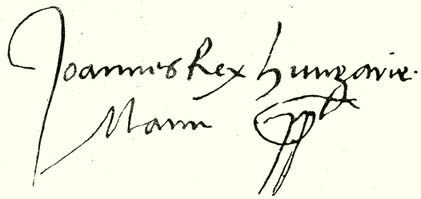
- Signature

John Zápolya or Szapolyai (Hungarian: Szapolyai/ Zápolya János; Croatian: Ivan Zapolja; Romanian: Ioan Zápolya; Slovak: Ján Zápoľský; 1487 – 22 July 1540), was King of Hungary (as John I) from 1526 to 1540. His rule was disputed by Archduke Ferdinand I, who also claimed the title King of Hungary. He was Voivode of Transylvania before his coronation, from 1510 to 1526.

John came from a prominent Croatian-Slavonian noble family. His father became one of Hungary's wealthiest lords and served as Palatine of Hungary. During the Peasants' Revolt of 1514 led by György Dózsa, John gained influence through his military campaigns and by crushing the revolt, which bolstered his authority and earned him the title of "liberator of the realm." However, his power declined after his sister Barbara's death in 1515. And in 1528, he fled to Poland, later aligning with the Ottomans, leading Hungary to become an Ottoman vassal state.

== Rise of the Szápolya family ==
John was the oldest son of Count Stephen Zápolya and his second wife, Hedwig of Cieszyn. Stephen Zápolya was descended from a Croatian noble family from Slavonia. Their family name was derived from the Croatian phrase "za polje" (literally translated as "behind field"). Stephen became one of the wealthiest lords in the Kingdom of Hungary after inheriting the large domains of his brother, Emeric Zápolya, in 1487. Stephen Zápolya's marriage with the Silesian duchess, Hedwig, who was related to Emperor Maximilian I, increased the prestige of the Zápolya family.

=== Habsburg-Jagiellon war of succession ===
Stephen Zápolya had no sons when Matthias Corvinus, King of Hungary, died on 6 April 1490, according to a contemporaneous report, but a charter issued in September 1491 already mentioned John, showing that John was born between the two dates. Stephen Zápolya became Palatine of the Kingdom of Hungary from 1492 until his death in 1499.

Vladislaus's brother, King Sigismund Jagiellon of Poland, came to Hungary to mediate between the royal family and the Zápolyas in late June. Emperor Maximilian had already in September declared war on Hungary, because he wanted to protect his claim (acknowledged in the 1491 Peace of Pressburg) to succeed Vladislaus. The teenager Stephen Zápolya was made one of the commanders of the Hungarian army. During the war, the envoys of King Vladislaus and Maximilian signed a secret treaty on 30 March 1506 about the marriage of Vladislaus's daughter, Anne Jagiellon, and Maximilian's grandson, Ferdinand.

=== Childhood ===
John was born in Szepes Castle (now Spiš Castle in Slovakia), which was an important center of the Zápolyas' domains. At the Diet of Hungary in 1497, Stephen Zápolya's opponents circulated rumours about his intention to have his son crowned king. John and his younger brother, George, inherited their father's vast domains in 1499. Their domains were primarily located in Upper Hungary (now Slovakia), where they held most landed estates in five counties. John could write letters in Latin, showing that his mother provided excellent education to him. Hedwig of Cieszyn wanted to persuade Vladislaus II, King of Hungary and Bohemia, to marry his only child, Anne, to John. However king Vladislaus refused the idea of marriage between princess Anne and John Zápolya.

== Party leader of the gentry ==
Zápolya began his public career as a member of the new Diet at Rákos in 1505. On 13 October, the Diet, prompted by Zápolya, passed a bill which prohibited the election of a foreigner as king if Vladislaus died without male issue. The bill was aimed at creating a legal basis for Zápolya's ascension to the throne after the death of Vladislaus, but the king refused to ratify it, and the Diet was closed by the king. Moreover, Vladislaus's wife, Anne of Foix-Candale, gave birth to a son, Louis, on 1 July 1506.

Zápolya's serious conflicts with the royal court had meanwhile made him the leader of a "national party", consisting of the smaller untitled noblemen (the gentry) who were opposed to the pro-Habsburg orientation of the higher aristocracy, the higher clergy, and King Vladislaus. The Diet initially refused to elect the infant crown prince Louis as successor to Vladislaus, but Louis was finally crowned on Vladislaus's demand on 4 June 1508. According to the late 16th-century historian Miklós Istvánffy, when the king returned from Bohemia in early 1510, Zápolya asked Vladislaus for the hand of his daughter Anne, but Vladislaus refused.

== Voivode of Transylvania ==
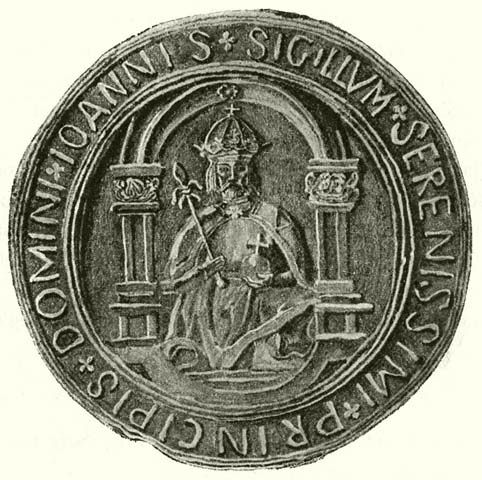
Royal seal of Zápolya

Vladislaus II made John Zápolya Voivode of Transylvania and Count of the Székelys on 8 November 1510. He moved to Transylvania and took up residence in Kolozsvár (now Cluj-Napoca, Romania) in March 1511. The Ottomans invaded the southern frontier of the Kingdom of Hungary in April 1511. John regularly held Diets for the representatives of the "Three Nations of Transylvania". He also headed the judicial assemblies of the Székely people.

Vladislaus's brother, Polish king Sigismund I the Old, married John's younger sister, Barbara Zápolya in early 1512. To show off his wealth, John went with Barbara to Poland accompanied by 800 horsemen who wore gilded clothes. This increased the influence of the Zápolyas, but only in the short term, as Barbara died in 1515. John raided Ottoman Bulgaria in summer 1513. After returning to Transylvania, he crushed a revolt in Hermannstadt (now Sibiu, Romania) and forced the townspeople to pay an extraordinary tax.

=== Crushing the Peasants' Revolt of 1514 ===
Zápolya launched a new campaign into Bulgaria in early May 1514. Meanwhile, Tamás Bakócz, Archbishop of Esztergom, declared a Crusade against the Turks on 9 April. About 40,000 peasants joined the crusade and assembled near Pest, although their lords had tried to retain them before the harvest. The "crusade" soon turned into a peasant rebellion. As the peasant army marched toward Turkish territory, they took to plundering nearby noble manors. Many villagers refused to pay taxes and duties. On 22 May, Vladislaus and the Archbishop ordered the peasants to disband, but they refused. Peasant bands took control of the southern lowlands along the rivers Danube and Tisza and murdered many nobles.

The main army of the peasants, commanded by György Dózsa, laid siege to Temesvár (now Timișoara, Romania). Stephen Báthory defended the town. Zápolya, who had returned from his Ottoman campaign, came to relieve Temesvár. His army routed the peasants on 15 July.

The leaders of the revolt were tortured to death with much cruelty. Dózsa was put on a red-hot iron "throne" with a red-hot iron "crown" on his head, and his accomplices were compelled to eat his flesh before being executed. In October, the Diet deprived the peasants of the right to free movement and obliged them to work on their lords' lands without remuneration one day in every week. Zápolya's victory over the peasant revolt strengthened his authority in several ways: on the one hand, he had opposed the "crusade" from the beginning, and on the other hand, it gained him support among the petty nobility (gentry). The Diet hailed Zápolya as the "liberator of the realm" and rewarded him with a payment of 20 denars for each peasant household. Supporters of Zápolya were appointed to the royal council, becoming a majority, and his friend, Gregory Frankopan, Archbishop of Kalocsa, was made chancellor. The previous chancellor, George Szatmári, Archbishop of Esztergom, remained hostile to Zápolya.

Zápolya, Stephen Báthory, Emeric Török, and Michael Paksy joined forces to lay siege to Žrnov, the Ottoman fortress near Nándorfehérvár (now Belgrade, Serbia) in April 1515. However, Sinan, Bey of Smederovo, defeated their united troops. The defeat weakened Zápolya's position.

== King of Hungary ==
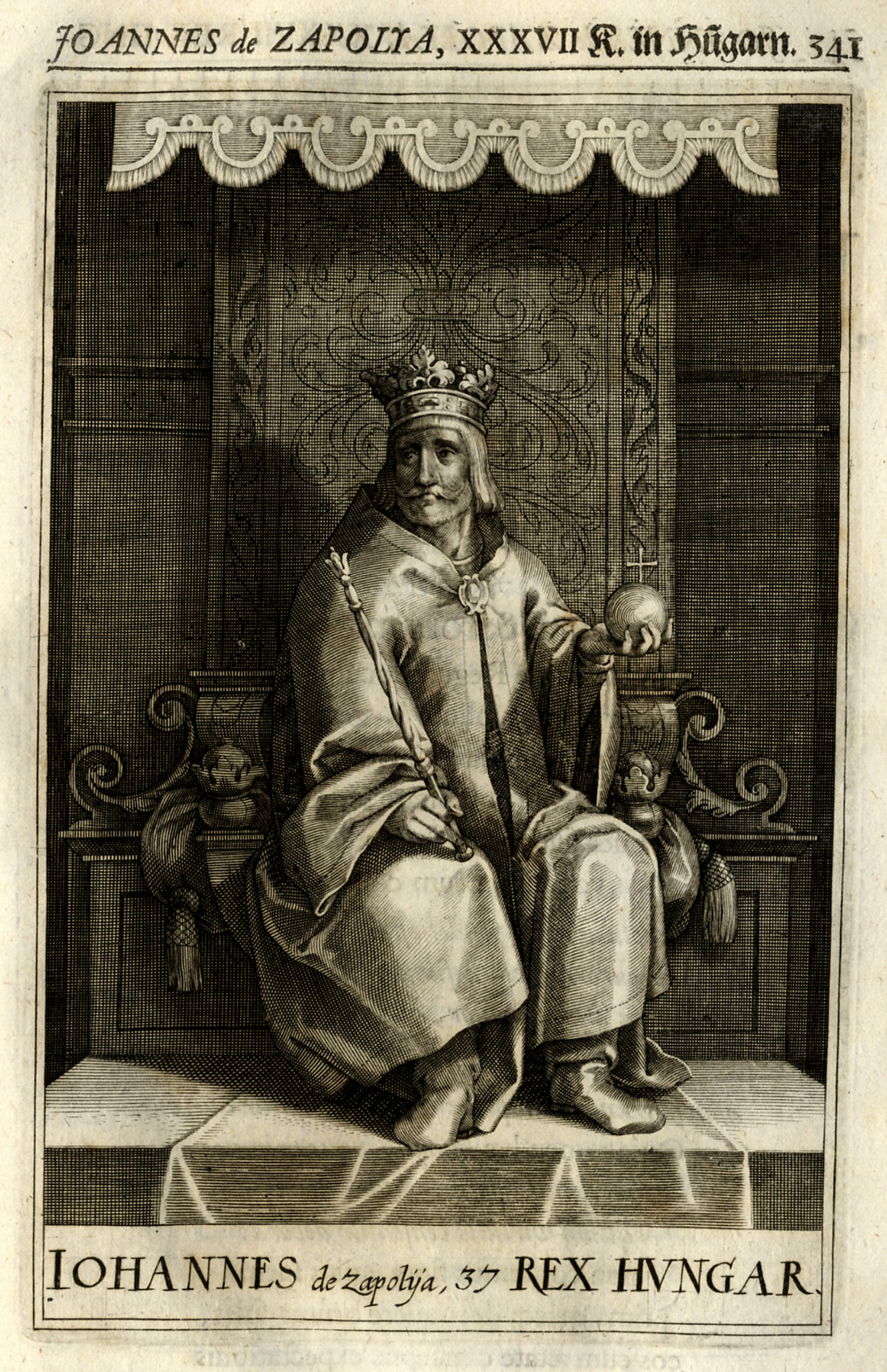
King John Zápolya of Hungary (Nádasdy Mausoleum, 1664)

In 1526, the Ottoman Empire crushed the Hungarian royal army in the Battle of Mohács and killed King Louis II. Zápolya was en route to the battlefield with his sizable army but did not participate in the battle for unknown reasons. The Ottomans sacked the royal capital of Buda and occupied Syrmia, then withdrew from Hungary. The last three months of the year were marked by a power vacuum; political authority was in a state of collapse, yet the victors chose not to impose their rule.

Two candidates stepped into the breach. One was Zápolya, voivode of Transylvania and Hungary's most prominent aristocrat as well as commander of an intact army. The other was Archduke Ferdinand of Austria, the late king's brother-in-law and brother of Holy Roman Emperor Charles V, who claimed Hungary for the House of Habsburg.

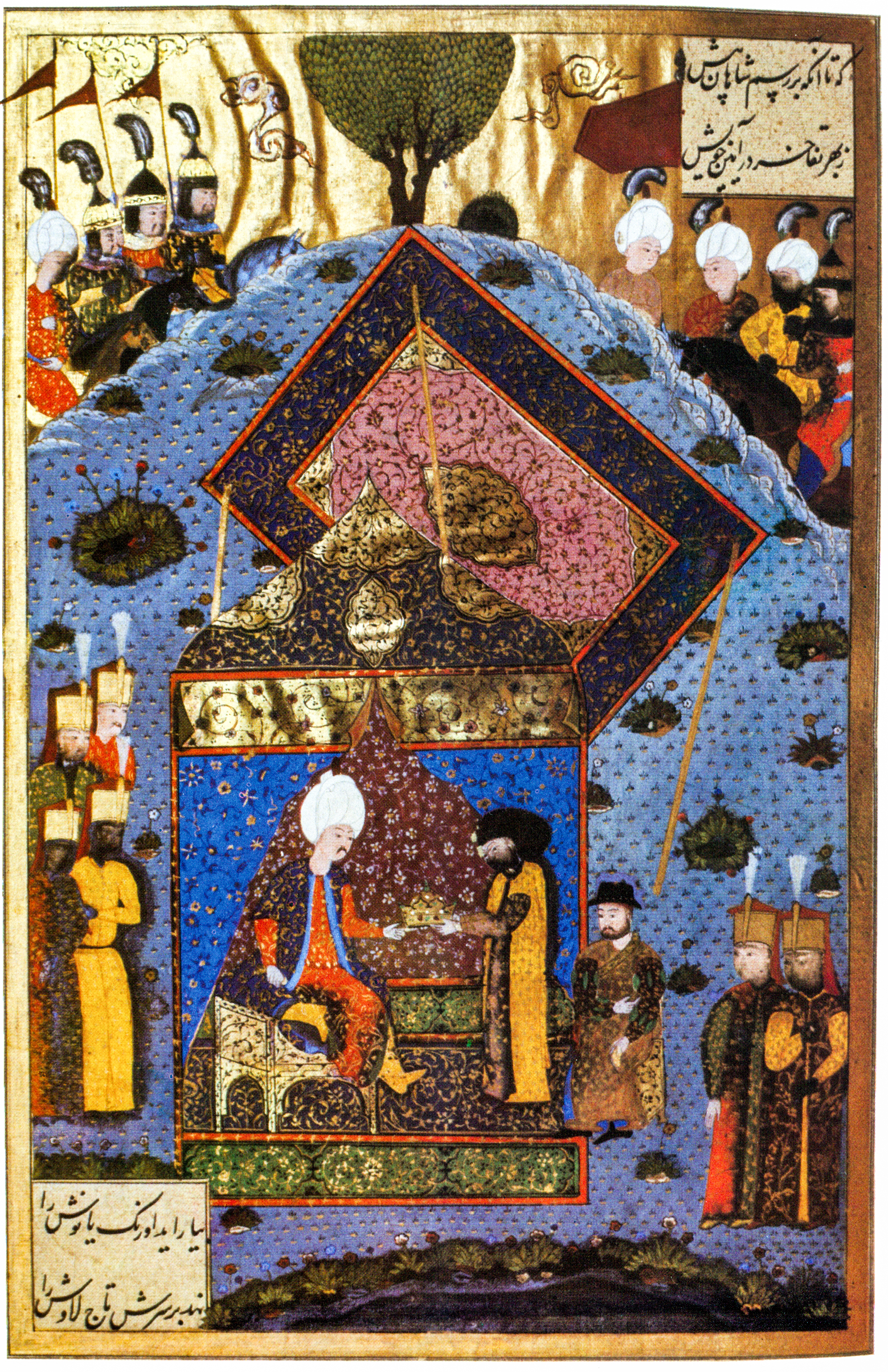
The Ottoman Sultan Suleiman the Magnificent returns the Holy Crown to John Zápolya.

The majority of Hungary's untitled lesser nobility (the gentry) backed Zápolya, who for fifteen years had been playing a leading role in Hungarian political life. Part of the aristocracy acknowledged his leadership, and he enjoyed the enthusiastic support – not always reciprocated – of the lesser nobility. Most of his opponents succumbed at Mohács: the Hungarian branch of the Jagiellon dynasty became defunct, and its pro-Habsburg following was decimated. The higher nobility of Hungary (the magnates or barons) sided with Ferdinand, and gathered in Pozsony for Ferdinand's election. The German dynasty's main argument – one that many historians would judge to be decisive – was that the Habsburg dynasty could help Hungary fight against the Ottomans. But in 1526, the promise rang empty. Hungary had been fighting the Ottomans for over a century, during which time the Empire and the Habsburgs had offered much encouragement but no tangible help. The likelihood of assistance was further reduced by the conflict of Ferdinand's older brother, Emperor Charles V, and King Francis I of France that once again flared into open war in the summer of 1526. This circumstance led the Voivode to discount the threat lurking behind the Habsburgs' candidacy: that Zápolya's Hungary would have to contend not only with the Ottomans, but also with an attack from the west.

Thus Zápolya took no notice of his rival's protests, nor of those voiced by the few Hungarians who rallied to Ferdinand. On 10 November 1526, Zápolya had himself proclaimed king at the Diet at Székesfehérvár by the lesser nobles (gentry), and he was duly crowned the next day. Ferdinand was also elected king by the magnates, barons, and the Catholic clergy in a rump Diet in Pozsony on 17 December 1526.

Profiting from nine months of relative calm, John strove to restore state authority. He drew on his vast private wealth, the unconditional support of the lesser nobility, and the assistance of some aristocrats to impose his policies in domestic affairs. However, in the crucial sphere of foreign relations, success eluded him. He sought an entente with the Habsburgs, proposing to form an alliance against the Ottomans, but Ferdinand rejected all attempts at reconciliation. John's envoys fanned out across Europe in quest of support. Only in France did they find a positive response, but even that was ineffective since Francis was intent not on reconciling Hungary and the Habsburgs, but on drawing Hungary into a war against Charles and his family.

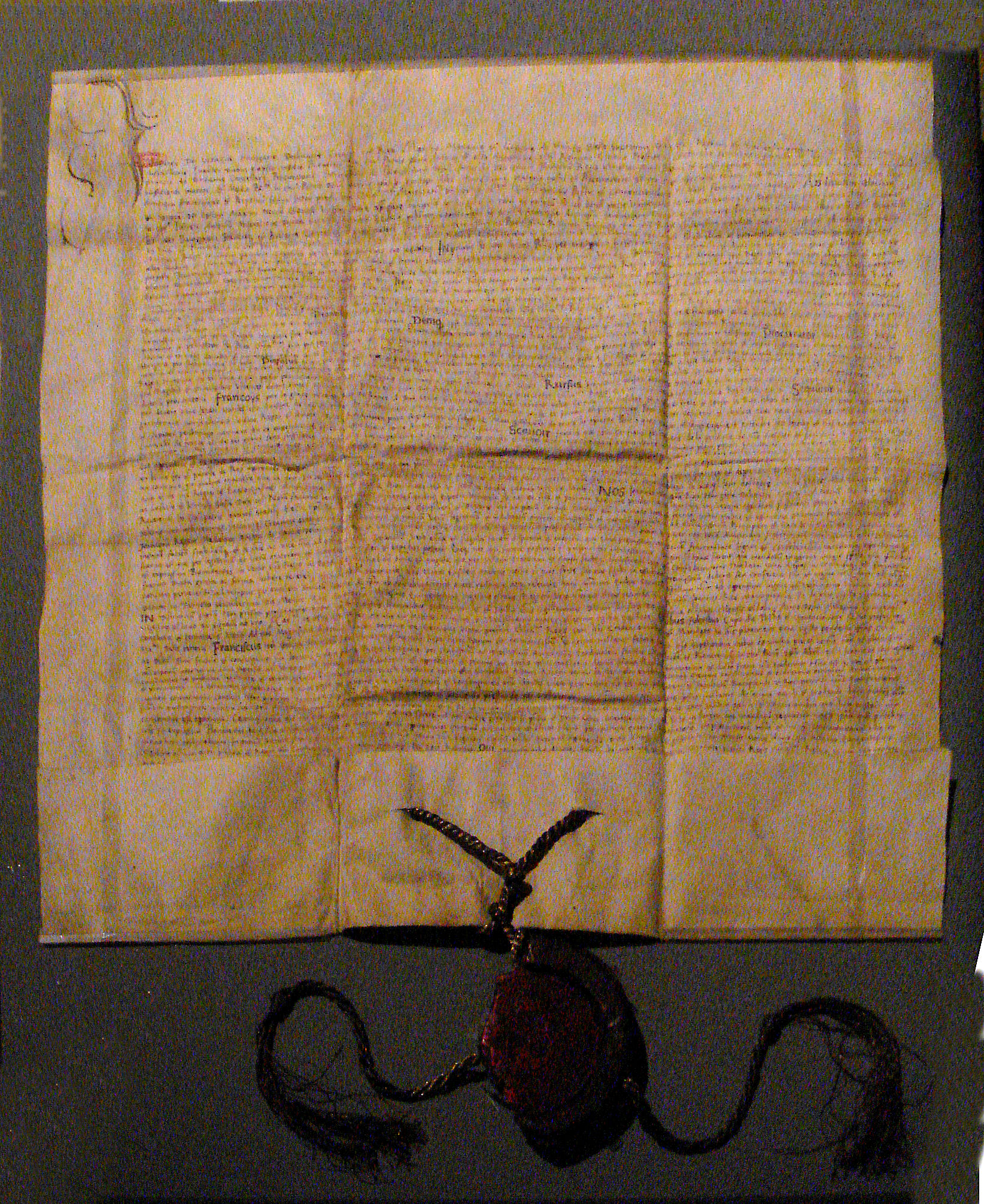
Franco-Hungarian Treaty of alliance, 1529.

Europe's political balance underwent a major shift in the summer of 1527, when, in a somewhat unplanned operation, mercenary forces of the emperor occupied Rome and drove Pope Clement VII, one of France's principal allies, to capitulate. This development freed Ferdinand – who also acquired the Bohemian throne in late 1526 – from the burden of assisting his brother. By then, Ferdinand had developed a Hungarian policy that was fully in keeping with the interests of his realms. He judged that if Hungary, unable to resist the Ottoman Empire, took action independently of Austria and Bohemia, it might well enter into an alliance with the Ottomans against its western neighbors. It was therefore in the interest of Austria and Bohemia that the Habsburgs gain control of Hungary, by force if necessary.

In July 1527, Ferdinand sent an army of German mercenaries into Hungary. The moment was well chosen, for John Zápolya's forces were tied up in the southern counties of Hungary, where Slavonic peasants, incited by Ferdinand, had rebelled; the revolt was led by the 'Black Man', Jovan Nenad. In one sweep, the pro-Habsburg soldiers captured Buda. John hurriedly redeployed his army, but on 27 September in the Battle of Tarcal (near Tokaj), he suffered a bloody defeat. Based on the earlier election of the Diet at Pozsony, Ferdinand was crowned in the Székesfehérvár Basilica on 3 November 1527. In 1528 John fled Hungary for Poland, where he stayed with Prince Jan Amor Tarnowski.

After Zápolya received no assistance from European rulers to resolve the ongoing war conflict with Ferdinand (only empty promises), he had no choice but to send his envoy, Heironymus Łaski, to Istanbul to seek help. Suleiman I, who had not invaded the country in 1526, now did not want it to fall under Habsburg control. Therefore, alongside military support, he began the actual occupation of Hungarian territories and their annexation to the Ottoman Empire. The sultan sought to force Zápolya into a vassal relationship, which he later accomplished with Transylvania. This was an old method used by the Ottoman Empire, which had also been applied against Balkan states, such as Serbia, in the 14th and 15th centuries, where they were first compelled into dependency and then annexed in the following decades.

In 1529 John approached the Ottomans, and agreed to make Hungary a vassal state in return for recognition and support. Sultan Suleiman the Magnificent accepted, and sent Ottoman armies to invade Austria (which included the Siege of Vienna), a war which lasted till 1533. This allowed John to regain his position in Hungary in 1529, by the efforts of Frater George Martinuzzi, despite the association with the Ottomans which tainted him at the time. Martinuzzi became royal treasurer and John's most trusted minister.

In 1533, the Ottomans made peace and ceded western Hungary to Ferdinand. Ferdinand now began to press John for control of the rest. In 1538, by the Treaty of Nagyvárad, John designated Ferdinand to be his successor after his death, as he was childless. However, in late January to early February 1539, he married Isabella Jagiellon, and on 15 July 1540 they had a son, John Sigismund. King John died seven days later on 22 July 1540 in Szászsebes (Sebeş).

== Ancestors ==
Ancestors of John Zápolya

8. John
4. Ladislaus Vajdafi (+1453)
2. Stephen Zápolya
5. Katalin (from unknown family)
1. John Zápolya
24. Przemyslaus I of Cieszyn
12. Bolesław I of Cieszyn
25. Elisabeth (+1373), Duchess of Bytom
6. Przemysław II of Cieszyn
26. Siemowit IV, Duke of Masovia
13. Euphemia of Masovia
27. Alexandra of Lithuania
3. Hedwig of Cieszyn
28. Boleslaw III of Warszawa
14. Bolesław IV of Warsaw
29. Anna Olshansky
7. Anna of Masovia
30. Alexander of Kiev
15. Barbara Aleksandrówna
31. Anastasia of Moscow

== See also ==
- Beatrice of Naples
- First Congress of Vienna
- Ivan Karlović
- Petar Keglević

== Sources ==
- Barta, Gábor (1994). "The Emergence of the Principality and its First Crises (1526–1606)". In Köpeczi, Béla; Barta, Gábor; Bóna, István; Makkai, László; Szász, Zoltán; Borus, Judit (eds.). History of Transylvania. Akadémiai Kiadó. pp. 247–300. ISBN 963-05-6703-2.
- Barta, Gábor; Granasztói, György (1981). "A három részre szakadt ország és a török kiűzése (1526–1605)". In Benda, Kálmán; Péter, Katalin (eds.). Magyarország történeti kronológiája, II: 1526–1848 [Historical Chronology of Hungary, Volume I: 1526–1848] (in Hungarian). Akadémiai Kiadó. pp. 361–430. ISBN 963-05-2662-X.
- Cartledge, Bryan (2011). The Will to Survive: A History of Hungary. C. Hurst & Co. ISBN 978-1-84904-112-6.
- Engel, Pál; Kristó, Gyula; Kubinyi, András (1998). Magyarország története, 1301–1526 (in Hungarian). Osiris. ISBN 963-379-171-5.
- Engel, Pál (2001). The Realm of St Stephen: A History of Medieval Hungary, 895–1526. I.B. Tauris Publishers. ISBN 1-86064-061-3.
- Kontler, László (1999). Millennium in Central Europe: A History of Hungary. Atlantisz Publishing House. ISBN 963-9165-37-9.
- Markó, László (2006). A magyar állam főméltóságai Szent Istvántól napjainkig: Életrajzi Lexikon [Great Officers of State in Hungary from King Saint Stephen to Our Days: A Biographical Encyclopedia] (in Hungarian). Helikon Kiadó. ISBN 963-547-085-1.
- Nagy, Gábor (2008). "Szapolyai István és János alakja Isthvánffi Miklós Historiaejában [The personalities of Stephen and John Zápolya in Miklós Isthvánffi's Historiae]" (PDF). Publicationes Universitatis Miskolcinensis, Sectio Philosophica (in Hungarian). 13 (3). Miskolci Egyetem: 267–294. Archived from the original (PDF) on 4 March 2016.
- Neumann, Tibor (November 2014). "Dózsa legyőzője. Szapolyai János erdélyi vajdasága (1510–1526). [The man who defeated Dózsa: voivodeship of John Zápolya in Transylvania (1510–1526)]". Székelyföld (in Hungarian). 18 (11). Hargita Kiadó: 93–107.
- Neumann, Tibor (2020). "Két nádor és egy vajda, avagy a Szapolyaiak útja a királyi trónig [Two Palatines and one Voivode: or, the Szapolyais' Road to the Hungarian Throne]". In Fodor, Pál; Varga, Szabolcs (eds.). Egy elfeledett magyar királyi dinasztia: A Szapolyaiak (in Hungarian). MTA Bölcsészettudományi Kutatóközpont. pp. 13–47. ISBN 978-963-416-220-9.
- Oborni, Teréz (2012). "Szapolyai (I) János". In Gujdár, Noémi; Szatmáry, Nóra (eds.). Magyar királyok nagykönyve: Uralkodóink, kormányzóink és az erdélyi fejedelmek életének és tetteinek képes története [Encyclopedia of the Kings of Hungary: An Illustrated History of the Life and Deeds of Our Monarchs, Regents and the Princes of Transylvania] (in Hungarian). Reader's Digest. pp. 152–155. ISBN 978-963-289-214-6.
- Szakály, Ferenc (1981). "A középkori magyar királyság virágzása és bukása, 1301–1526: 1490–1525 [Heyday and fall of the medieval Kingdom of Hungary, 1301–1526: 1490–1526]". In Solymosi, László (ed.). Magyarország történeti kronológiája, I: a kezdetektől 1526-ig [Historical Chronology of Hungary, Volume I: From the Beginning to 1526] (in Hungarian). Akadémiai Kiadó. pp. 318–350. ISBN 963-05-2661-1.

János I Szapolyai House of Szapolyai Born: 2 February 1487 Died: 22 July 1540
Regnal titles
| Preceded by Péter Szentgyörgyi | Voivode of Transylvania; 1510–1526 | Succeeded by Péter Perényi |
| Preceded by Louis II | King of Hungary contested by Ferdinand I 1526–1540 | Succeeded by John II Sigismund |
