= János Statileo =

Bishop of Transylvania (c. 1472 – 1542)

- Born: c. 1472; Trogir
- Died: 8 April 1542
- Occupations: Writer, diplomat, bishop
- Family: Antun Vrančić, (nephew)

János Statileo (Croatian: Ivan Statilić; c. 1472 – 8 April 1542) was a writer, the Bishop of Transylvania, and a diplomat at the courts of King Louis II of Hungary and John Zápolya. He was also the uncle of Antun Vrančić.

== Family ==
The Statilić (Statileo) family was a Croatian noble family from Trogir. The earliest known family member was Stannius Stanossevich. Over time, the family name evolved from Stanossevich to Stanošević and eventually to Statilić in Croatian, Statileo in Venetian, and Statilius in Latin.

Stannius had two known children: a daughter, Magdalena, and a son, Mihovil. Magdalena married Ivan Berislavić, and they had a son, Petar Berislavić, who became the Ban of Croatia (1513–1520).

Mihovil had five known children:

- Nikola (c. 1470 – after 1500)
- Ivan (c. 1472 – 1543)
- Matej (c. 1475 – after c. 1510)
- Klara (c. 1485 – c. 1516)
- Margareta (c. 1485 – ?).

Margareta married Frane (Franjo, Francisco) Vrančić and gave birth to Antun Vrančić (1504–1573).

== History ==
Ivan Statilić (Statileo) was born in Trogir between c. 1472 and 1475, into a Croatian noble family. Historians often refer to him by the Hungarian version of his first name, János, and use either the Latin Statilius or the Venetian Statileo variants of his family name.

Ivan Statilić pursued his studies in Italy before entering the ecclesiastical field. By 1513, Petar Berislavić appointed Statilić as the archpriest of Segesd and tasked him, as provost of the guard, with administering the bishopric of Veszprém while Berislavić went to fight the Ottomans. After Berislavić was killed in 1520 during a battle near Plješevica, Statilić transported his body from Bihać to Veszprém, where he buried him.

Subsequently, Statilić became the guardian of his nephew, Antun Vrančić, the future Archbishop of Esztergom, and ensured his education.

Statilić entered the royal court of King Ulászló II (Vladislaus) around 1515, where he was appointed royal secretary. He retained this position after Ulászló's death when King Lajos (Louis) II ascended the throne.

In 1516, King Lajos sent Statilić to Rome, where he addressed Pope Leo X and the cardinals, requesting financial support for the Bishop of Veszprém to aid in the fight against the Ottomans. That same year, Statilić authored a book about Saint John of Trogir (Ivan Trogirski) titled Vita beati Ioannis episcopi et confessoris Traguriensis, et eius miracula ("The Life of the Blessed John, Bishop and Confessor of Traguria, and His Miracles").

Due to his eloquence and fluency in Latin, Italian, Croatian, and Hungarian, along with his knowledge of French, German, and Polish, Statilić was an ideal candidate for diplomacy and became one of Hungary's most skilled diplomats.

In 1521, King Lajos II sent Statilić, accompanied by an entourage of 18 staff, to Venice to request financial support from the Signoria for defense against the Turks. On 29 August, the same day Belgrade fell to Sultân Süleymân, Statilić, dressed in black mail armor, entered the Council of Venice. He presented a letter from King Lajos and delivered a powerful speech in Latin, titled Iohannis Statilii Hungariae Legati Oratio, urging the Venetians to assist Hungary in its struggle against the advancing Ottoman forces.

On 21 September, Doge Antonio Grimani responded, explaining that Venice, having signed a treaty with the Sultan in 1517, wished to maintain good relations with the High Porte and, therefore, could not provide Hungary with the aid requested by the king. However, three days later, Statilić was discreetly given 800 sequins to support the defense of Senj, on the condition that the donation remain strictly confidential. On 26 September, deeply disappointed, Statilić bid farewell to the Council of Venice.

In 1526, Statilić marched with King Lajos II toward Mohács and defended János Zápolya against criticism for not yet joining the king's army. Before the Battle of Mohács, Lajos sent Statilić to Erdély (Transylvania) with orders for Zápolya.

What Statilić did next remains uncertain. According to one account, he stayed with Zápolya and missed the battle. Another report claims that he returned to the king and relayed Zápolya's message, urging Lajos to postpone the battle until Zápolya could arrive with his larger army. Despite this, King Lajos did not wait, and Statilić did not participate in the battle.

After the disastrous defeat at the Battle of Mohács, and, most significantly, the death of King Lajos, Hungary descended into civil war between two rival kings: János Zápolya and Ferdinand of Habsburg. Statilić, who believed that Transylvania had the right to exist independently of foreign rule, sided with Zápolya and became one of his most loyal supporters.

For the remainder of his life, Statilić undertook numerous diplomatic missions on behalf of Zápolya, including the negotiations for the Franco-Hungarian Alliance of 1528. In 1534, when Medgyes fell and Alvise Gritti was killed on 29 September, Gritti's compatriot Fran Trankvil Andreis (Andronicus Tranquillus Parthenius), a native of Trogir, was captured. Statilić saved Andreis's life by paying a ransom of 500 florins to the Moldavians.

From 1534 to 1542, Statilić served as the Roman Catholic Bishop of Transylvania in the Eastern Hungarian Kingdom. He worked tirelessly to prevent the spread of the Protestant Reformation in Transylvania.

Along with George Martinuzzi, Bishop of Várad (now Oradea in Romania), and Franjo Frankopan, Archbishop of Kalocsa, Statilić was one of the main organizers of a 1538 religious debate in Segesvár (now Sighișoara, Romania) between Catholic and Evangelical clerics. He also played a significant role, alongside Fráter György Martinuzzi (Juraj Utješenović), in negotiating the Peace of Várad, concluded on 4 February 1538.

This treaty, initially kept secret, established mutual recognition between the two rival kings' territories based on the status quo. Furthermore, it stipulated that after King János's death, his portion of Hungary would be inherited by Ferdinand and his successors.

Cruel rumors and slanders were spread about Statilić by Ferdinand's supporters. On 11 February 1539, Papal nuncio Girolamo Aleandro, referencing comments by Pál Várdai, wrote the following about Statilić:

"... Statilium odio esse hominibus, quia sit avarus, rapax, inhonestus, satis doctus tamen et facundus et audax et in primis omnium mortalium maledicentissimus, qui etiam pontificibus et regibus non parcat." (Statilius is hated by men because he is avaricious, rapacious, and dishonest, but quite learned, eloquent, audacious, and, above all mortals, the most slanderous, who spares not even popes and kings.)

After King János Zápolya learned that the Sultan intended to attack him with a large army the following year, he tasked Statilić with an extensive diplomatic mission to secure support from King Ferdinand I, Pope Paul III, King François I, and King Henry VIII.

On 15 December 1538, after a challenging journey, Statilić arrived in Vienna and held a lengthy discussion with King Ferdinand. He explained that his mission was to seek assistance from Christian princes for an offensive war on land and sea against the Turks. He emphasized the grave danger faced by Hungary and all of Christendom, asserting that the defense of Transylvania and eastern Hungary was integral to the defense of Christian Europe.

After a brief stay, Statilić departed Vienna and arrived in Venice on 3 January 1539, where he attempted to persuade the Republic to join forces against the Turks. Later that month, he reached Rome, though he fell ill with a severe fever. By February, having recovered, he met with Pope Paul III. In their discussions, Statilić highlighted the shared interests of Christendom and urged the Pope to mediate a peace agreement between the French king and the Habsburg emperor. He also addressed the lack of religious leadership in the kingdom due to Ferdinand’s political opposition to pro-Zápolya bishops, urging the Pope to confirm the bishops appointed by King János Zápolya. Additionally, he requested that the Pope send an envoy to King János. The Pope, impressed by Statilić’s diplomatic skill and candor, noted that he felt comfortable speaking openly with him. During his stay in Rome, Statilić also met with the envoy of Emperor Charles V to discuss peace.

Statilić left Rome for the French court on 22 March, arriving in Paris in early June. King François I provided 40,000 écus for Zápolya and gifted Statilić 2,500 écus for his efforts. On 25 June, Statilić bid farewell to the French king and, two days later, wrote to English Chancellor Thomas Cromwell, informing him that he could not travel to London and would instead send Zápolya's Chamberlain, Péter Bábay, a Knight of the Golden Spur, to meet with Henry VIII.

By late June, Statilić began his journey home. During the first week of August, upon entering Italy, he received the news that, after years of waiting, the Pope had officially appointed him as a bishop.

Following the death of János Zápolya in 1540, Statilić continued to protect the interests of Queen Izabella. That year, he traveled to Antwerp, arriving in July, to meet with the English ambassador in Bruges and request a treaty and financial support to fight the Ottomans. He then traveled to Antwerp to meet Emperor Charles V, but by the time he arrived, Charles had already left. On 18 August, Statilić met the Emperor in Utrecht before traveling to Brussels.

At the start of September, he began his journey back home. During his absence, on 7 July, King János and Queen Izabella’s son, János Zsigmond, was born. On 22 July, King János died. On his deathbed, he instructed his nobles not to abide by the Peace of Várad, but instead to place his son János Zsigmond on the throne.

While in Italy, Statilić encountered difficulties when Ferdinand had arrested his secretary, who had been carrying a letter from the King of France urging the Hungarians to continue the fight against the Habsburgs. Ferdinand refused to issue Statilić a passport to travel through his domains in Italy, as Statilić had continued to work against him, despite having promised to support Ferdinand after Zápolya's death.

Because Statilić needed to return to Buda before envoys sent to the High Porte returned, he sent a messenger to Constantinople (Istanbul) to request a passport for travel through Ottoman territories in Bosnia and Serbia. Statilić overcame all obstacles and arrived in Ragusa (Dubrovnik) on 30 March 1541, in Belgrade on 10 April, and finally reached Transylvania, where debate continued over whether the Peace of Várad should be implemented.

On 4 May, King Ferdinand's army besieged Buda in an attempt to seize it from Zápolya. However, the defenders repelled attack after attack, and the poorly managed siege weakened. Sultan Suleiman arrived on 21 August and defeated the Habsburg army, forcing it to flee. Losing faith in Zápolya's supporters, Suleiman not only rescued Buda but, on 29 August, his soldiers took the city by deception. On 2 September, Suleiman entered the city and took control of it.

The fall of Buda caused widespread fear, not only in Austria and Bohemia but also among Zápolya's supporters. Martinuzzi and Statilić began questioning Suleiman's benevolence, and discussions were held about reuniting Hungary under Ferdinand.

On 29 December 1541, Gáspár Serédy, Captain of Upper Hungary, representing Ferdinand, and Ivan Statilić, Bishop of Transylvania, representing Zápolya, signed the Treaty of Gyalu (Gilău). According to the treaty, Hungary would be reunited under Ferdinand if he retook Buda. Ferdinand began planning a military campaign to liberate Buda the following summer.

By the end of December 1541, Statilić had fallen ill and had doctors and medicine brought to him. Despite his weakened condition, he traveled to Torda (Turda) for a Diet of Transylvania, held on 2 March 1542, where he supported Fráter György Martinuzzi's bid for leadership of Transylvania. Martinuzzi was elected royal governor and called for another Diet to be held on 19 March to revise the constitution of Transylvania. Since Statilić was crucial to the discussions, the Diet was initially set to be held at Gyula-Fehér Castle. However, due to Statilić's failing health, the Diet was moved up to 8 March and held in Torda.

Upon his return home, Statilić's health rapidly deteriorated. By 16 March, he was so ill that he could not even move in his bed. Sensing the seriousness of his condition, he took the final measures, preparing his will and making donations and pledges regarding his possessions.

On 8 April 1542, Ivan Statilić died of "un colpo di apoplessia" (a stroke of apoplexy) and did not live to witness Ferdinand's failure during the Siege of Pest. He was the last Bishop of Transylvania, and after his death, the Diet of Hungary appropriated the Transylvanian bishopric's revenues in favor of the royal family. The episcopal see was left vacant for a decade. After Statilić's death, Fráter György Martinuzzi, the powerful cardinal, continued to control the politics of Transylvania.

== Works ==
Statileo, János (1516). Vita beati Ioannis episcopi et confessoris Traguriensis, et eius miracula. Vienna, Pannonia.

== Sources ==
- Botlik, Richárd (2013). "Statileo János diplomáciai küldetései János király (1526–1540) uralkodásának idejéből [The Diplomatic Missions of János Statileo during the Reign of King John (1526–1540)]". Századok (in Hungarian). 147 (4). Magyar Történelmi Társulat: 813–854. ISSN 0039-8098.
- Csepregi, Zoltán (2020). "Egyházi irodalom és reformáció a Szapolyai-uralkodók országrészében (1526–1570) [Religious literature and Reformation in the Zápolya kings' realm (1526–1570]". In Fodor, Pál; Varga, Szabolcs (eds.). Egy elfeledett magyar királyi dinasztia: a Szapolyaiak [A Forgotten Hungarian Royal Dynasty: The Zápolya]. MTA Bölcsészettudományi Kutatóközpont. pp. 243–260. ISBN 978-963-416-220-9.
- Ferrari-Cupilli, Giuseppe (1887). Cenni Biografici di alcuni uomini illustri della Dalmazia[Biographical notes of some illustrious men of Dalmatia].
- Keul, István (2009). Early Modern Religious Communities in East-Central Europe: Ethnic Diversity, Denominational Plurality, and Corporative Politics in the Principality of Transylvania (1526–1691). Brill. ISBN 978-90-04-17652-2.
- Sörös, Pongrác (1916). Statileo János életéhez[The life of János Statileo].
- Szegedi, Edit (2009). "The Reformation in Transylvania: New Denominational Identities; Confessionalization". In Pop, Ioan-Aurel; Nägler, Thomas; Magyari, András (eds.). The History of Transylvania, Vol. II (From 1541 to 1711). Romanian Academy, Center for Transylvanian Studies. pp. 229–254. ISBN 978-973-7784-04-9.
