= Treaty of Gyalu =

1541 treaty between Holy Roman Emperor Ferdinand I and Isabella Jagiellon

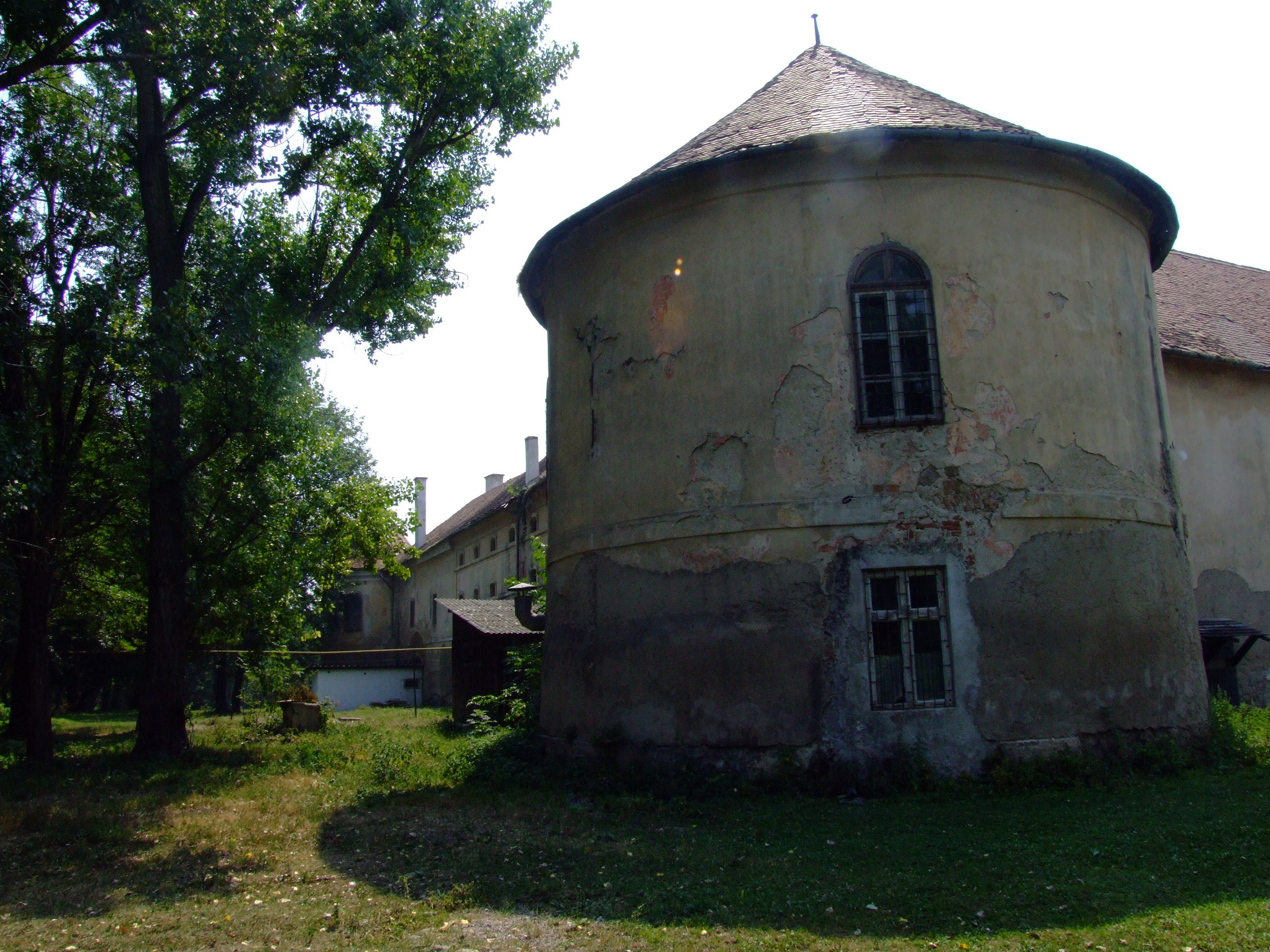
Tha Gyalu Castle where the treaty was signed.

The Treaty of Gyalu was an agreement between Holy Roman Emperor Ferdinand I and Isabella Jagiellon the queen dowager of the Eastern Hungarian Kingdom and the widow of John Zápolya, signed in Gyalu (today Gilău, Romania) by Gáspár Serédy captain of Upper Hungary and János Statileo bishop of Transylvania on 29 December 1541. The participants tried to renegotiate John Sigismund Zápolya's possessions in connection with the previous Treaty of Nagyvárad. According to the treaty, Royal Hungary and the Eastern Hungarian Kingdom would have been re-united under Ferdinand's rule, in case he had recaptured Buda. However, the Diet of Torda negotiated the Ottoman disapproval in reference to the treaty in October and refused to accept the terms of the agreement on 20 December 1542.

The eastern territories of the former medieval Kingdom of Hungary ruled by King John Sigismund Zápolya were known as the Eastern Hungarian Kingdom until the Treaty of Speyer (1570).
