= Treaty of Speyer (1570) =

Agreement between the Principality of Transylvania and Habsburg Kingdom of Hungary

The Treaty of Speyer, signed at the Diet of Speyer in 1570, was a peace agreement between the two Hungarian Kingdoms, Royal Hungary led by Maximilian II, and the Eastern Hungarian Kingdom, ruled by John Sigismund Zápolya, which led to the establishment of the Principality of Transylvania.

== Transylvania before the Treaty of Speyer ==
Unlike the autonomous Kingdom of Croatia, medieval Transylvania was not a separate Land of the Holy Crown of Hungary, it was simply an administrative district, and an integral part of the medieval Kingdom of Hungary.

== Status of Transylvania after the treaty ==
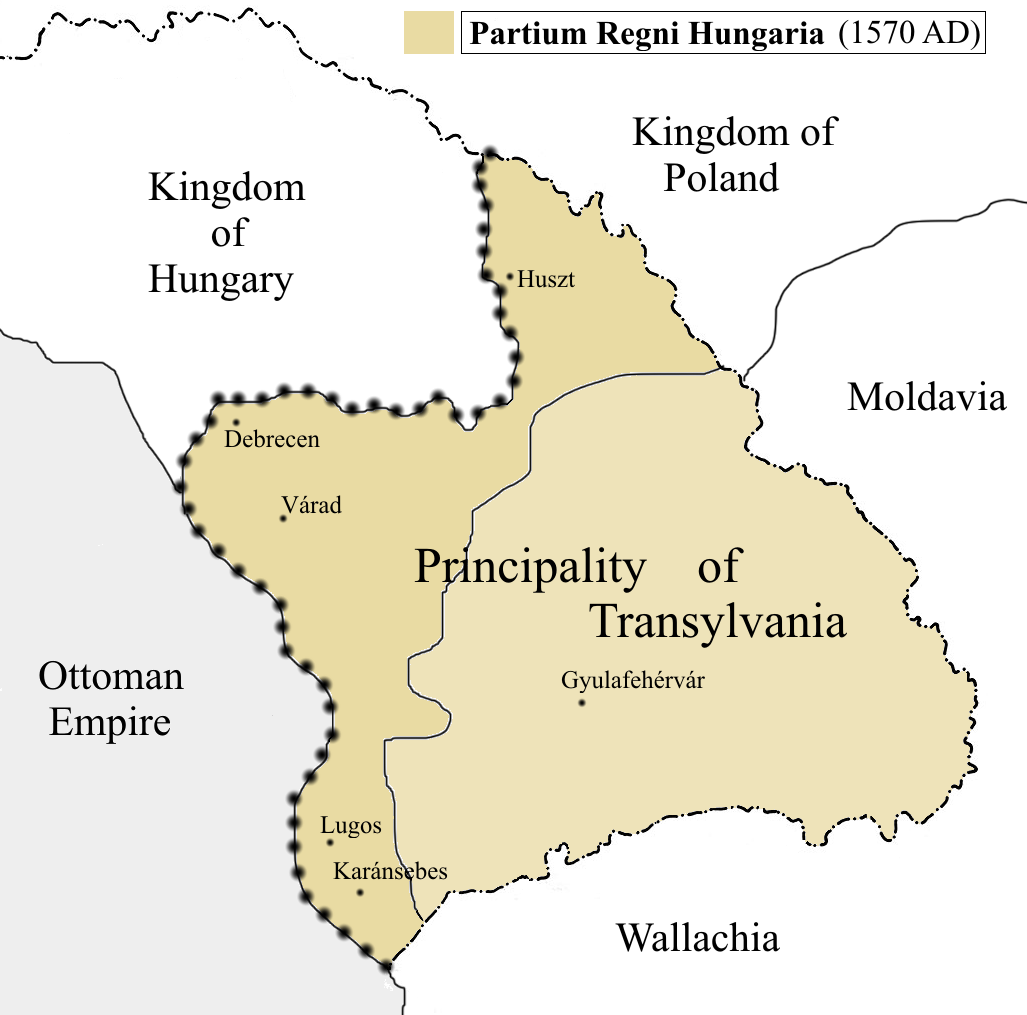
John Sigismund's realm in 1570

John Sigismund abdicated as King of Hungary, however, Maximilian II recognized John Sigismund's authority as "Prince of Transylvania" and, in return, John Sigismund accepted Maximilian II as King of Hungary with suzerainty over his principality.

John Sigismund became princeps Transsylvaniae et partium regni Hungariae dominus – Prince of Transylvania and of a part of the Kingdom of Hungary. According to the treaty, the Principality of Transylvania continued to be part of the Kingdom of Hungary in the sense of public law, the Treaty of Speyer stressed in a highly significant way that John Sigismund's possessions belonged to the Holy Crown of Hungary and he was not permitted to alienate them.

This treaty, like the earlier Treaty of Nagyvárad, endorsed the principle of a united Hungary. Partium and Transylvania were entrusted to John Sigismund Zápolya, as a vassal of King Maximilian. As mentioned above, the Zápolyas had already held the Partium, but now the Habsburgs recognized their lordship. In a sense, John Sigismund traded his royal title for territory.
