= Kingdom of Hungary (1526–1867) =

Period of Hungary under Habsburg control

Kingdom of Hungary Magyar Királyság (Hungarian) Königreich Ungarn (German) Regnum Hungariae (Latin)
- 1526–1867
- Coat of arms
- Motto: Regnum Mariae Patrona Hungariae ("Kingdom of Mary, the Patroness of Hungary")
- Anthem: "Rákóczi-induló" (Hungarian) (English: "Rákóczi March")
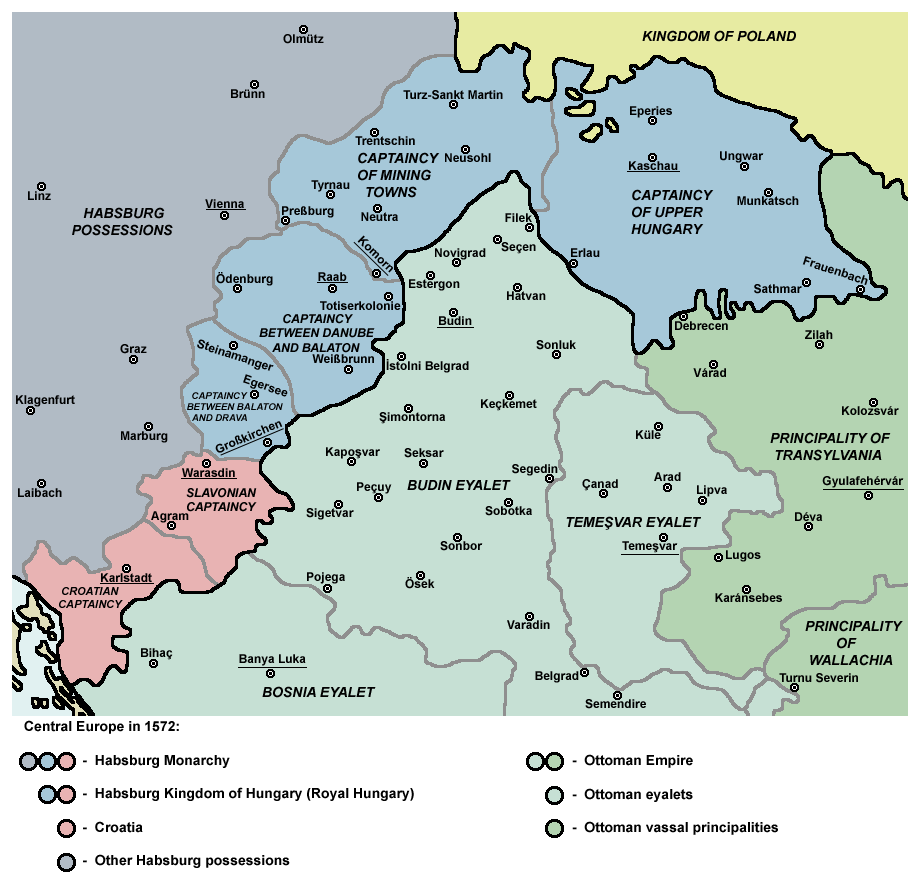
- Habsburg Kingdom of Hungary (light blue) in personal union with the Kingdom of Croatia (red), both within the Habsburg monarchy (in shades of blue) in 1572.
- Status: Crownland of Habsburg monarchy and from 1804 the Austrian Empire; In personal union with the Kingdom of Croatia (see historical context section)
- Capital: Buda (1526–1536, 1784–1873); Pressburg (1536–1783)
- Common languages: Official languages: Latin; (before 1784; 1790–1844); German; (1784–1790; 1849–1867); Hungarian; (1836–1849) Other spoken languages: Romanian; Slovak; Croatian; Slovene; Serbian; Italian; Ruthenian
- Religion: Catholic; Reformed; Lutheranism; Orthodox; Unitarianism; Judaism
- Demonym: Hungarian
- Government: Absolute monarchy
- Apostolic King
  - 1526–1564 (first): Ferdinand I
  - 1848–1867 (last): Franz Joseph I
- Palatine
  - 1526–1530 (first): Stephen Báthory
  - 1847–1848 (last): Stephen Francis
- Legislature: Royal Diet
- Historical era: Early Modern
  - Battle of Mohács: 29 August 1526
  - Treaty of Nagyvárad: 24 February 1538
  - Siege of Eger: 9 September – 17 October 1552
  - Battle of Saint Gotthard: 1 August 1664
  - Wesselényi conspiracy: 1664–1671
  - Treaty of Karlowitz: 26 January 1699
  - War of Independence: 1703–1711
  - Hungarian Reform Era: 1825-1848
  - Hungarian Revolution: 15 March 1848
  - 1867 Compromise: 30 March 1867
- Currency: Forint
Preceded by	Succeeded by
Kingdom of Hungary (1301–1526); Hungarian State	Austria-Hungary; Lands of the Crown of Saint Stephen
- Today part of: Hungary

The Kingdom of Hungary between 1526 and 1867 existed as a state outside the Holy Roman Empire, (Note: Although the Habsburgs ruled Hungary, it remained a separate country ruled in personal union with both the imperial title and the various lands within the empire (see Habsburg monarchy for details), and it was neither annexed nor incorporated into the empire.) but part of the lands of the Habsburg monarchy that became the Austrian Empire in 1804. After the Battle of Mohács in 1526, the country was ruled by two crowned kings (John I and Ferdinand I). Initially, the exact territory under Habsburg rule was disputed because both rulers claimed the whole kingdom. This unsettled period lasted until 1570 when John Sigismund Zápolya (John II) abdicated as King of Hungary in Emperor Maximilian II's favor.

In the early stages, the lands that were ruled by the Habsburg Hungarian kings were regarded as both the "Kingdom of Hungary" and "Royal Hungary". Royal Hungary was the symbol of the continuity of formal law after the Ottoman occupation, because it could preserve its legal traditions, but in general, it was de facto a Habsburg province. The Hungarian nobility forced Vienna to admit that Hungary was a special unit of the Habsburg lands and had to be ruled in conformity with its own special laws. However, Hungarian historiography positioned Transylvania in a direct continuity with the medieval Kingdom of Hungary in pursuance of the advancement of Hungarian interests.

Under the terms of the Treaty of Karlowitz, which ended the Great Turkish War in 1699, the Ottomans ceded nearly all of Ottoman Hungary. The new territories were united with the territory of the Kingdom of Hungary, and although its powers were mostly formal, the Diet of Hungary in Pressburg ruled the lands.

Two major Hungarian rebellions were the Rákóczi's War of Independence in the early 18th century and the Hungarian Revolution of 1848 and marked important shifts in the evolution of the polity. The kingdom became a dual monarchy in 1867, known as Austria-Hungary.

== Royal Hungary (1526–1699) ==
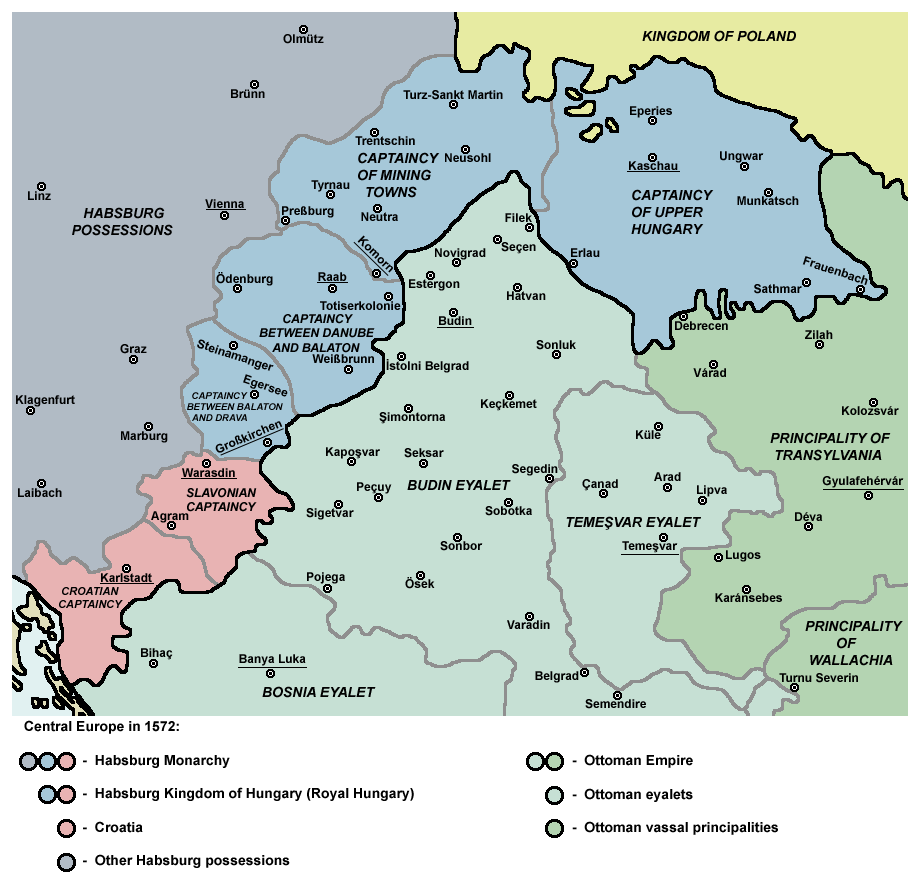
Captaincies of the Kingdom of Hungary around 1572

Royal Hungary (1526–1699), (Hungarian: Királyi Magyarország, German: Königliches Ungarn), was the name of the portion of the medieval Kingdom of Hungary where the Habsburgs were recognized as Kings of Hungary in the wake of the Ottoman victory at the Battle of Mohács (1526) and the subsequent partition of the country.

Temporary territorial division between the rival rulers John I and Ferdinand I occurred only in 1538, under the Treaty of Nagyvárad, when the Habsburgs got the northern and western parts of the country (Royal Hungary), with the new capital Pressburg (Pozsony, now Bratislava). John I secured the eastern part of the kingdom (known as the Eastern Hungarian Kingdom). The Habsburg monarchs needed the economic power of Hungary for the Ottoman wars. During the Ottoman wars the territory of the former Kingdom of Hungary was reduced by around 60 per cent. Despite these enormous territorial and demographic losses, the smaller and heavily war torn Royal Hungary was as important as the Austrian hereditary lands or the Lands of the Bohemian Crown in the late 16th century.

The territory of present-day Slovakia and northwestern Transdanubia were parts of this polity, while control of the region of northeastern Hungary often shifted between Royal Hungary and the Principality of Transylvania. The central territories of the medieval Hungarian kingdom were annexed by the Ottoman Empire for 150 years (see Ottoman Hungary).

In 1570, John Sigismund Zápolya abdicated as King of Hungary in Emperor Maximilian II's favor under the terms of the Treaty of Speyer.

The term "Royal Hungary" fell into disuse after 1699, and the Habsburg kings referred to the newly enlarged country by the more formal term "Kingdom of Hungary".

=== Habsburg kings ===
The Habsburgs, an influential dynasty of the Holy Roman Empire, were elected Kings of Hungary.

Royal Hungary became a part of the Habsburg monarchy and enjoyed little influence in Vienna. The Habsburg king directly controlled Royal Hungary's financial, military, and foreign affairs, and imperial troops guarded its borders. The Habsburgs avoided filling the office of palatine to prevent the holders amassing too much power. In addition, the so-called Turkish question divided the Habsburgs and the Hungarians: Vienna wanted to maintain peace with the Ottomans; the Hungarians wanted the Ottomans ousted. As the Hungarians recognized the weakness of their position, many became anti-Habsburg. They complained about foreign rule, the behaviour of foreign garrisons, and the Habsburgs' recognition of Turkish suzerainty in the Principality of Transylvania. This was usually under the suzerainty of the Ottoman Empire, however, it often had dual vassalage -Ottoman Turkish sultans and the Habsburg Hungarian kings- in the 16th and 17th centuries). Protestants, who were persecuted in Royal Hungary, considered the Counter-Reformation a greater menace than the Turks, however. The Austrian branch of Habsburg monarchs needed the economic power of Hungary for the Ottoman wars. During the Ottoman wars the territory controlled by the Kingdom of Hungary shrank by around 60%. Despite these enormous territorial and demographic losses, the smaller, heavily war-torn Royal Hungary had remained as economically important to the Habsburg rulers as the Austrian hereditary lands or the Bohemian crownlands even in the late 16th century. Out of all his countries, the depleted Kingdom of Hungary was, at that time, Ferdinand I's largest source of revenue.

=== Reformation ===
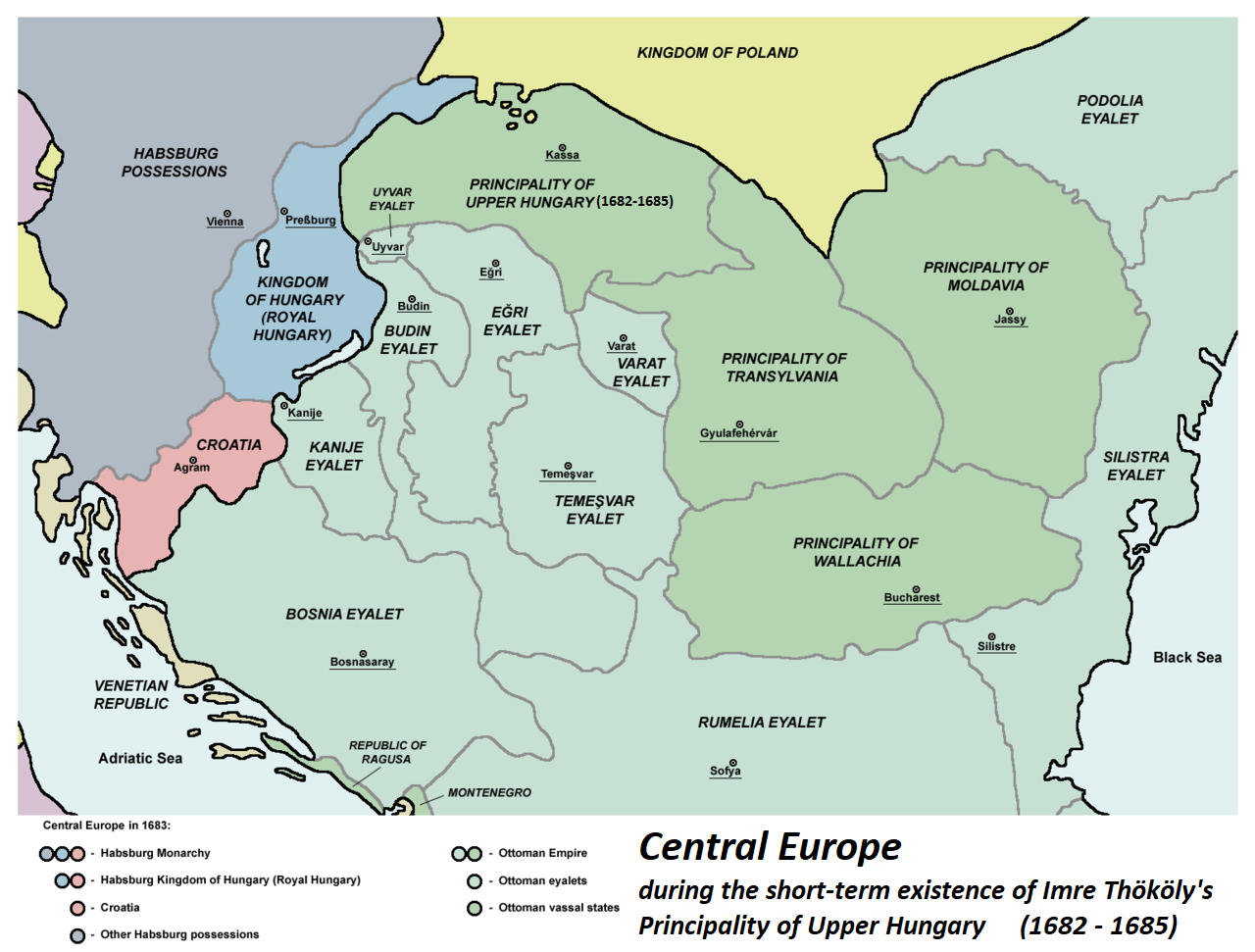
Royal Hungary, the Principality of Upper Hungary, the Principality of Transylvania and Ottoman eyalets around 1683

The Reformation spread quickly, and by the early 17th century hardly any noble families remained Catholic. In Royal Hungary, the majority of the population became Lutheran by the end of the 16th century.

Archbishop Péter Pázmány reorganized Royal Hungary's Roman Catholic Church and led a Counter-Reformation that reversed the Protestants' gains in Royal Hungary, using persuasion rather than intimidation. The Reformation caused rifts between Catholics, who often sided with the Habsburgs, and Protestants, who developed a strong national identity and became rebels in Austrian eyes. Chasms also developed between the mostly Catholic magnates and the mainly Protestant lesser nobles.

== Kingdom of Hungary in the early modern period until 1848 ==
=== 18th century ===
As the Habsburgs' control of the Turkish possessions started to increase, the ministers of Leopold I argued that he should rule Hungary as conquered territory. At the Diet of "Royal Hungary" in Pressburg, in 1687, the Emperor promised to observe all laws and privileges. Nonetheless, the hereditary succession of the Habsburgs was recognized, and the nobles' right of resistance was abrogated. In 1690 Leopold began redistributing lands freed from the Turks. Protestant nobles and all other Hungarians thought disloyal by the Habsburgs lost their estates, which were given to foreigners. Vienna controlled the foreign affairs, defense, tariffs, and other functions.

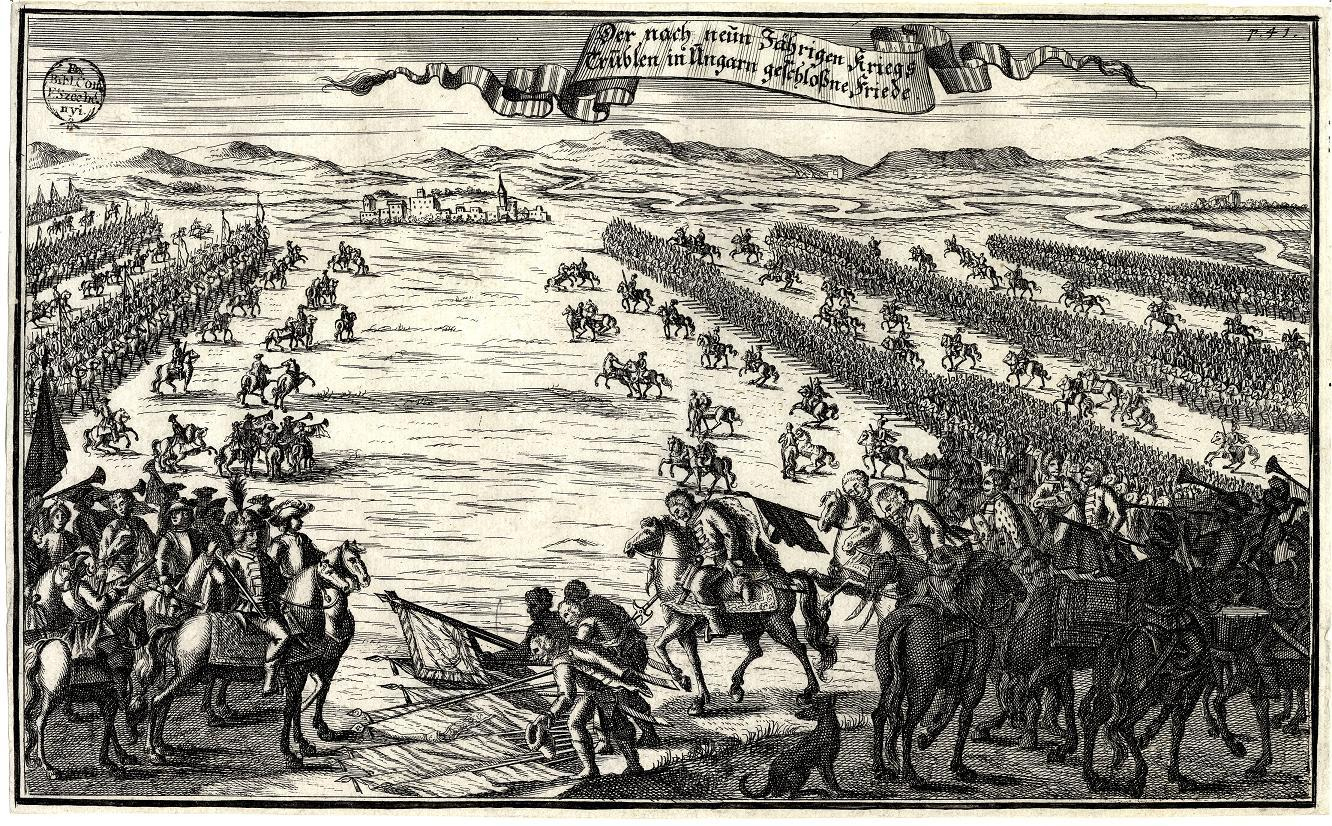
The capitulation of the Kuruc army in 1711

The repression of Protestants and the land seizures frustrated the Hungarians, and in 1703 a peasant uprising sparked an eight-year rebellion against Habsburg rule. In Transylvania, which became part of Hungary again at the end of the 17th century (as a province, called "Principality of Transylvania" with the Diet seated at Gyulafehérvár), the people united under Francis II Rákóczi, a Roman Catholic magnate. Most of Hungary soon supported Rákóczi, and the Hungarian Diet voted to annul the Habsburgs' right to the throne. Fortunes turned against the Hungarians, however, when the Habsburgs made peace in the west and turned their full force against them. The war ended in 1711, when Count Károlyi, General of the Hungarian Armies agreed to the Treaty of Szatmár. The treaty contained the emperor's agreement to reconvene the Diet in Pressburg and to grant an amnesty for the rebels.

Leopold's successor, King Charles III (1711–40), began building a workable relationship with Hungary after the Treaty of Szatmár. Charles asked the approval of the Diet for the Pragmatic Sanction, under which the Habsburg monarch was to rule Hungary not as emperor, but as a king subject to the restraints of Hungary's constitution and laws. He hoped that the Pragmatic Sanction would keep the Habsburg Empire intact if his daughter, Maria Theresa, succeeded him. The Diet approved the Pragmatic Sanction in 1723, and Hungary thus agreed to become a hereditary monarchy under the Habsburgs for as long as their dynasty existed. In practice, however, Charles and his successors governed almost autocratically, controlling Hungary's foreign affairs, defense, and finance but lacking the power to tax the nobles without their approval.

Charles organized the country under a centralized administration and in 1715 established a standing army under his command, which was entirely funded and manned by the non-noble population. This policy reduced the nobles' military obligation without abrogating their exemption from taxation. Charles also banned conversion to Protestantism, required civil servants to profess Catholicism, and forbade Protestant students to study abroad.

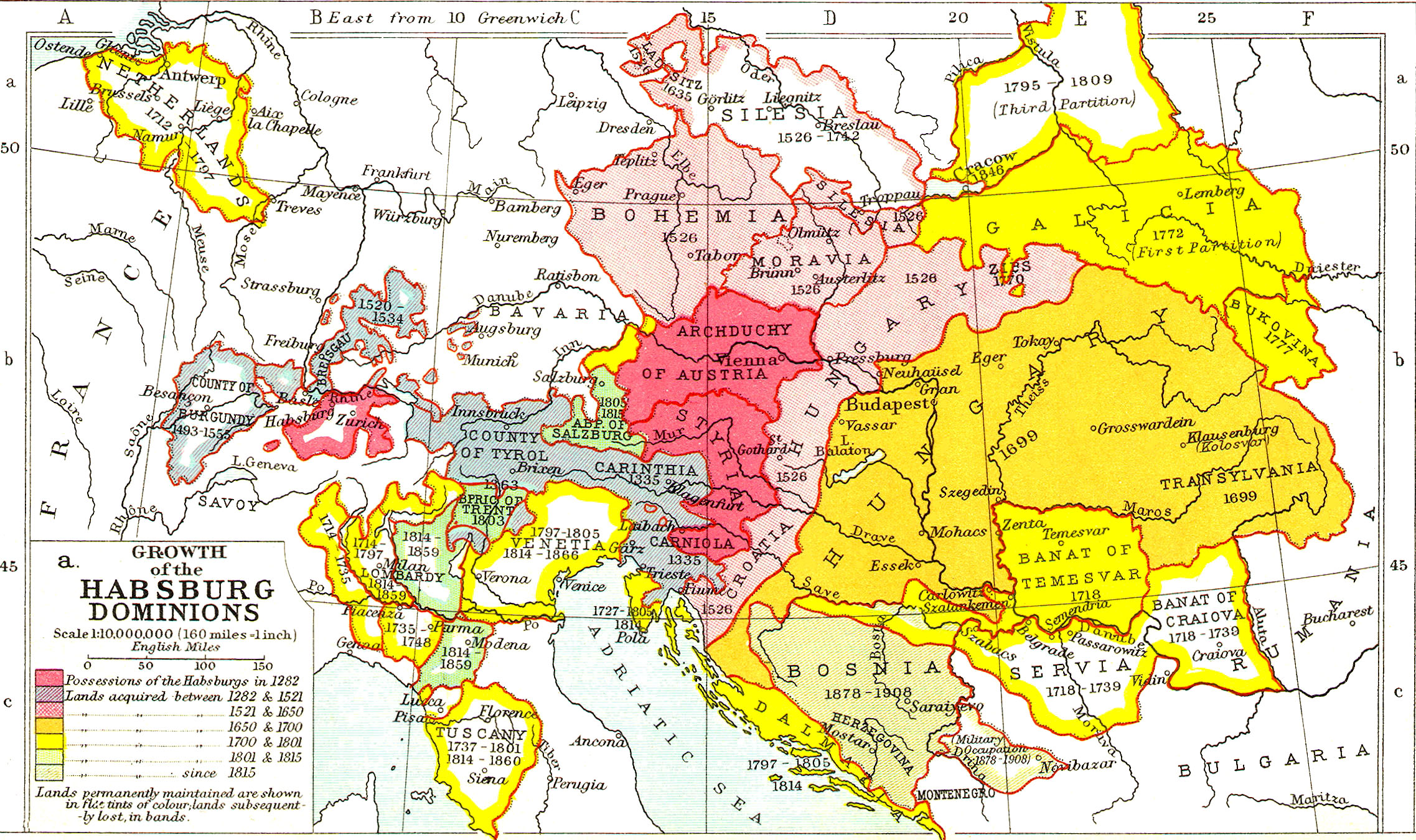
Growth of Habsburg territories

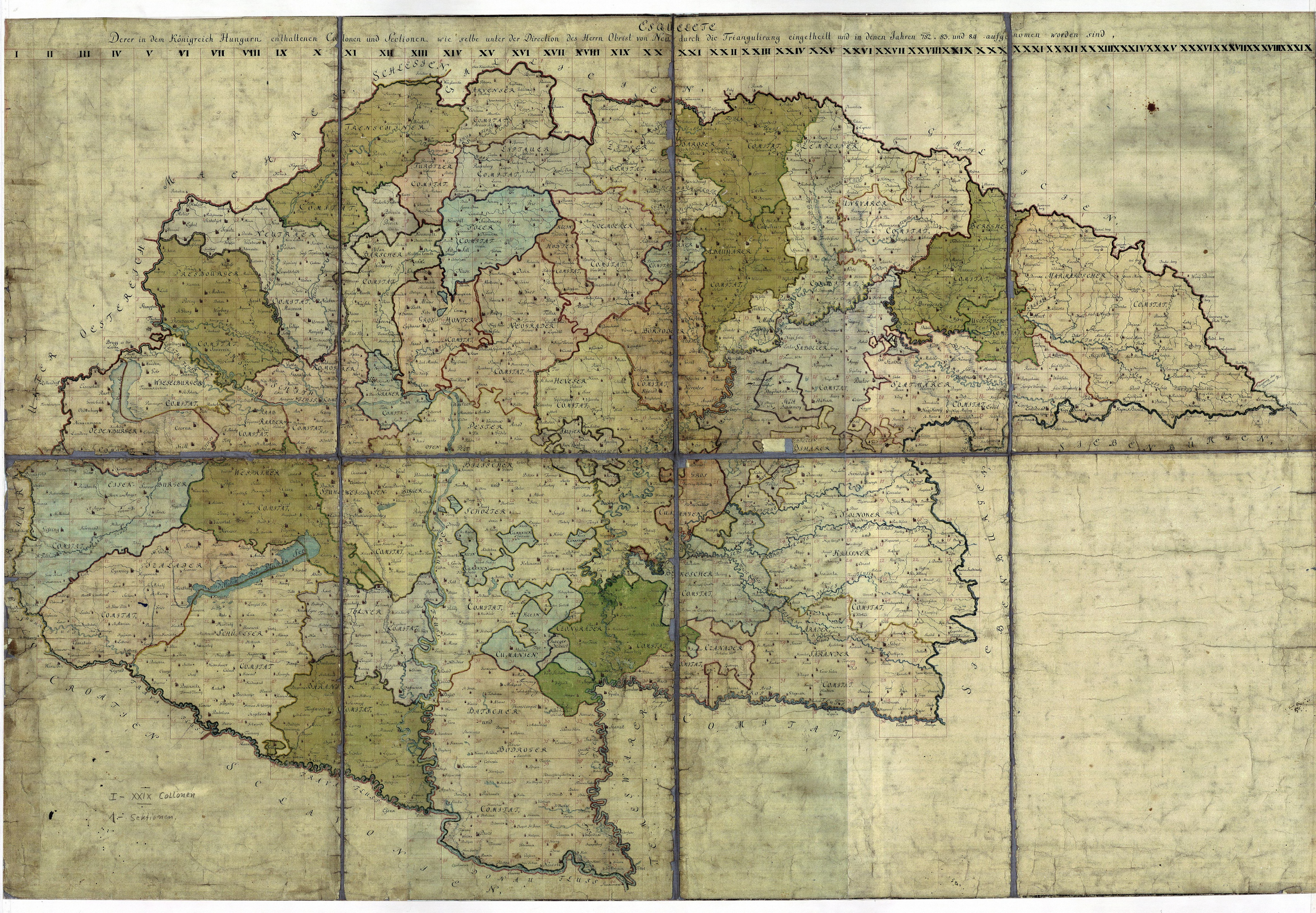
The Kingdom of Hungary on the Josephinische Landesaufnahme Original Map, 1782–1785

Maria Theresa (1741–80) faced an immediate challenge from Prussia's Frederick II when she became head of the House of Habsburg, facing the First Silesian War. In 1741 she appeared before the Diet of Pressburg holding her newborn son and entreated Hungary's nobles to support her. They stood behind her and helped secure her rule. Maria Theresa later took measures to reinforce links with Hungary's magnates. She established special schools to attract Hungarian nobles to Vienna.

Under Charles and Maria Theresa, Hungary experienced further economic decline. Centuries of Ottoman occupation and war had reduced Hungary's population drastically, and large parts of the country's southern half were almost deserted. A labor shortage developed as landowners restored their estates. In response, the Habsburgs began to colonize Hungary with large numbers of peasants from all over Europe, especially Slovaks, Serbs, Croatians, and Germans. Many Jews also immigrated from Vienna and the empire's Polish lands near the end of the 18th century. Hungary's population more than tripled to 8 million between 1720 and 1787. However, only 39 percent of its people were Magyars, who lived mainly in the center of the country.

In the first half of the 18th century, Hungary had an agricultural economy that employed 90 percent of the population. The nobles failed to use fertilizers, roads were poor and rivers blocked, and crude storage methods caused huge losses of grain. Barter had replaced money transactions, and little trade existed between towns and the serfs. After 1760 a labor surplus developed. The serf population grew, pressure on the land increased, and the serfs' standard of living declined. Landowners began making greater demands on new tenants and began violating existing agreements. In response, Maria Theresa issued her Urbarium of 1767 to protect the serfs by restoring their freedom of movement and limiting the corvée. Despite her efforts and several periods of strong demand for grain, the situation worsened. Between 1767 and 1848, many serfs left their holdings. Most became landless farmworkers because a lack of industrial development meant few opportunities for work in the towns.

Joseph II (1780–90), a dynamic leader strongly influenced by the Age of Enlightenment, shook Hungary from its malaise when he inherited the throne from his mother, Maria Theresa. In the framework of Josephinism, Joseph sought to centralize control of the empire and to rule it by decree as an enlightened despot. He refused to take the Hungarian coronation oath to avoid being constrained by Hungary's constitution. In 1781–82 Joseph issued a Patent of Toleration, followed by an Edict of Tolerance which granted Protestants and Orthodox Christians full civil rights and Jews freedom of worship. He decreed that German replace Latin as the kingdom's official language and granted the peasants the freedom to leave their holdings, to marry, and to place their children in trades. Hungary, Slavonia, Croatia, the Military Frontier and Transylvania became a single imperial territory under one administration, called the Kingdom of Hungary or "Lands of the Crown of St. Stephen". When the Hungarian nobles again refused to waive their exemption from taxation, Joseph banned imports of Hungarian manufactured goods into Austria and began a survey to prepare for the imposition of a general land tax.

Joseph's reforms outraged nobles and clergy of Hungary, and the peasants of the country grew dissatisfied with taxes, conscription, and requisitions of supplies. Hungarians perceived Joseph's language reform as German cultural hegemony, and they reacted by insisting on the right to use their own tongue. As a result, Hungarian lesser nobles sparked a renaissance of the Hungarian language and culture, and a cult of national dance and costume flourished. The lesser nobles questioned the loyalty of the magnates, of whom less than half were ethnic Hungarians, and even those had become French- and German-speaking courtiers. The Hungarian national reawakening subsequently triggered national revivals among the Slovak, Romanian, Serbian, and Croatian minorities within Hungary and Transylvania, who felt threatened by both German and Hungarian cultural hegemony. These national revivals later blossomed into the nationalist movements of the 19th and 20th centuries that contributed to the empire's ultimate collapse.

Late in his reign, Joseph led a costly, ill-fated campaign against the Turks that weakened his empire. On 28 January 1790, three weeks before his death, the emperor issued a decree cancelling all of his reforms except the Patent of Toleration, peasant reforms, and the abolition of the religious orders.

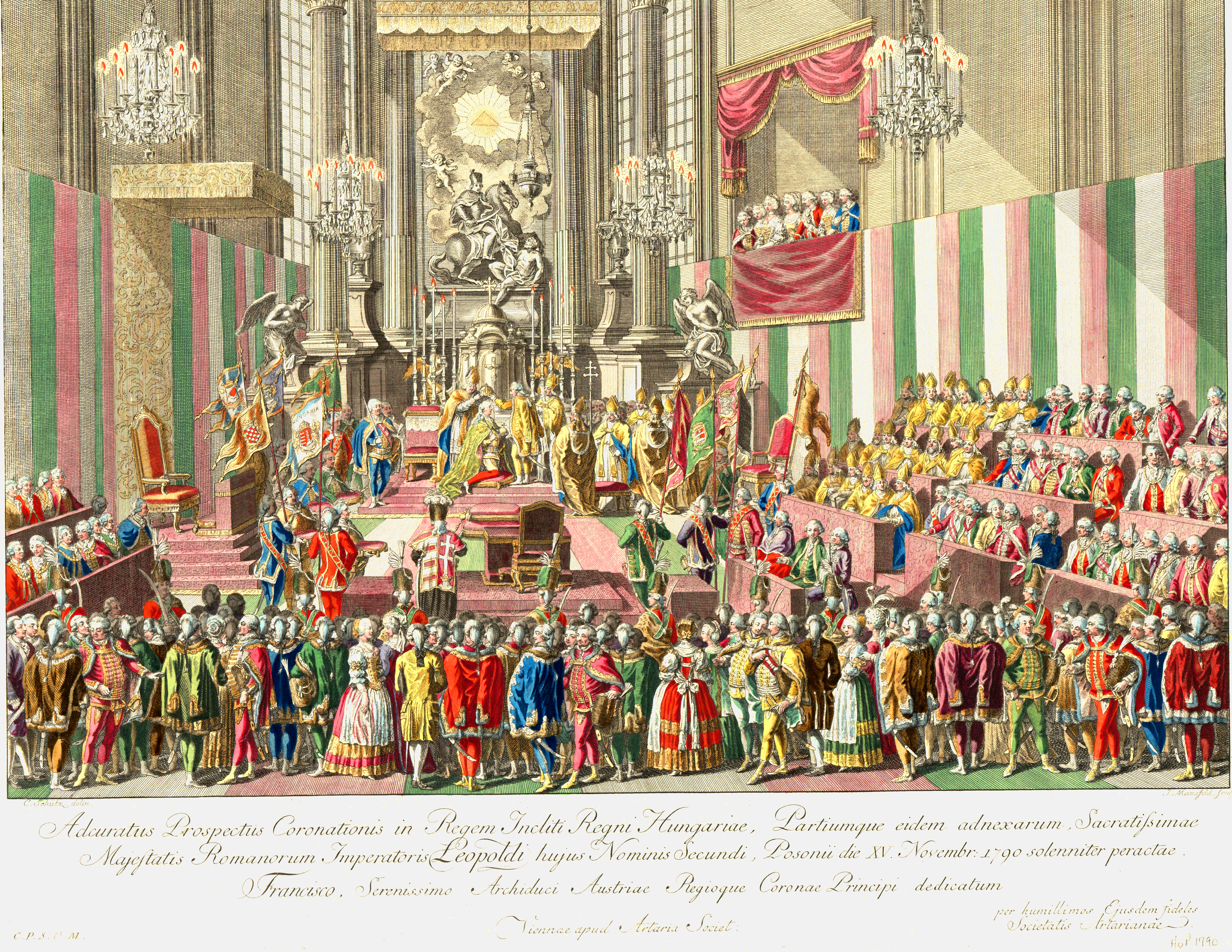
The coronation of Leopold II in Pressburg (today Bratislava), 1790

Joseph's successor, Leopold II (1790–92), re-introduced the bureaucratic technicality which viewed Hungary as a separate country under a Habsburg king. In 1791 the Diet passed Law X, which stressed Hungary's status as an independent kingdom ruled only by a king legally crowned according to Hungarian laws. Law X later became the basis for demands by Hungarian reformers for statehood in the period from 1825 to 1849. New laws again required approval of both the Habsburg king and the Diet, and Latin was restored as the official language. The peasant reforms remained in effect, however, and Protestants remained equal before the law. Leopold died in March 1792 just as the French Revolution was about to degenerate into the Reign of Terror and send shock waves through the royal houses of Europe.

=== First half of the 19th century ===
Enlightened absolutism ended in Hungary under Leopold's successor, Francis II (ruled 1792–1835), who developed an almost abnormal aversion to change, bringing Hungary decades of political stagnation. In 1795 the Hungarian police arrested Ignác Martinovics and several of the country's leading thinkers for plotting a Jacobin kind of revolution to install a radical democratic, egalitarian political system in Hungary. Thereafter, Francis resolved to extinguish any spark of reform that might ignite a revolution. The execution of the alleged plotters silenced any reform advocates among the nobles, and for about three decades reform ideas remained confined to poetry and philosophy. The magnates, who also feared that the influx of revolutionary ideas might precipitate a popular uprising, became a tool of the crown and seized the chance to further burden the peasants.

In 1804 Francis II, who was also the Holy Roman Emperor and ruler of the other dynastic lands of the Habsburg dynasty, founded the Austrian Empire, in which Hungary and all his other dynastic lands were included. In doing so he created a formal overarching structure for the Habsburg Monarchy, that had functioned as a composite monarchy for about three hundred years before. He himself became Francis I (Franz I.), the first Emperor of Austria (Kaiser von Österreich), ruling from 1804 to 1835, so later he was named the one and only Doppelkaiser (double emperor) in history. The workings of the overarching structure and the status of the new Kaiserthum’s component lands at first stayed much as they had been under the composite monarchy that existed before 1804. This was especially demonstrated by the status of the Kingdom of Hungary, whose affairs remained to be administered by its own institutions (King and Diet) as they had been under the composite monarchy, in which it had always been considered a separate Realm. Article X of 1790, which was added to Hungary's constitution during the phase of the composite monarchy uses the Latin phrase "Regnum Independens". In the new situation, therefore, no Imperial institutions were involved in its internal government.

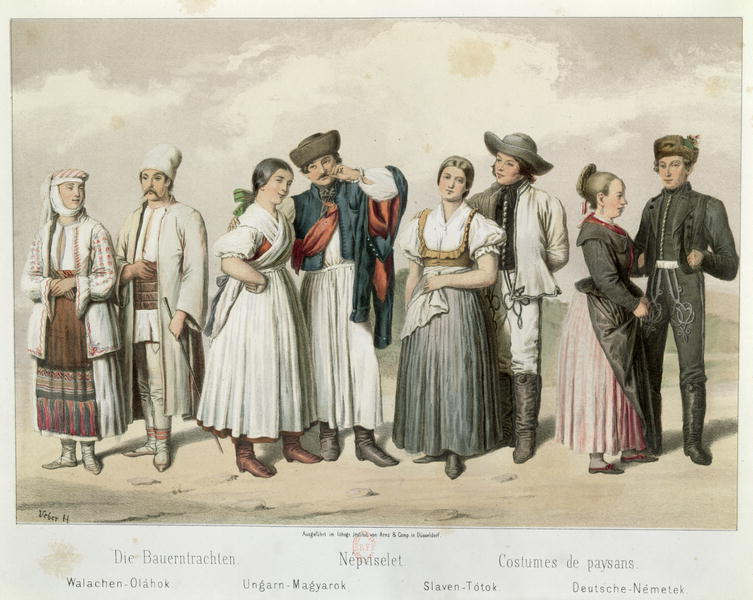
Costumes of inhabitants of the Kingdom of Hungary in 1855: ethnic Romanian, Hungarian (Magyar), Slovak and German peasants

By the start of the 19th century, the aim of Hungary's agricultural producers had shifted from subsistence farming and small-scale production for local trade to cash-generating, large-scale production for a wider market. Road and waterway improvements cut transportation costs, while urbanization in Austria, Bohemia, and Moravia and the need for supplies for the Napoleonic Wars boosted demand for foodstuffs and clothing. Hungary became a major grain and wool exporter. New lands were cleared, and yields rose as farming methods improved. Hungary did not reap the full benefit of the boom, however, because most of the profits went to the magnates, who considered them not as capital for investment but as a means of adding luxury to their lives. As expectations rose, goods such as linen and silverware, once considered luxuries, became necessities. The wealthy magnates had little trouble balancing their earnings and expenditures, but many lesser nobles, fearful of losing their social standing, went into debt to finance their spending.

Napoleon's final defeat brought recession. Grain prices collapsed as demand dropped, and debt ensnared much of Hungary's lesser nobility. Poverty forced many lesser nobles to work to earn a livelihood, and their sons entered education institutions to train for civil service or professional careers. The decline of the lesser nobility continued despite the fact that by 1820 Hungary's exports had surpassed wartime levels. As the number of lesser nobles who earned diplomas increased, the bureaucracy and professions became saturated, leaving a host of disgruntled graduates without jobs. Members of this new intelligentsia quickly became enamored of radical political ideologies emanating from Western Europe and organized themselves to effect changes in Hungary's political system.

Francis rarely called the Diet into session (usually only to request men and supplies for war) without hearing complaints. Economic hardship brought the lesser nobles' discontent to a head by 1825, when Francis finally convoked the Diet after a fourteen-year hiatus. Grievances were voiced, and open calls for reform were made, including demands for less royal interference in the nobles' affairs and for wider use of the Hungarian language.

The first great figure of the reform era came to the fore during the 1825 convocation of the Diet. Count István Széchenyi, a magnate from one of Hungary's most powerful families, shocked the Diet when he delivered the first speech in Hungarian ever uttered in the upper chamber and backed a proposal for the creation of a Hungarian academy of arts and sciences by pledging a year's income to support it. In 1831 angry nobles burned Szechenyi's book Hitel (Credit), in which he argued that the nobles' privileges were both morally indefensible and economically detrimental to the nobles themselves. Szechenyi called for an economic revolution and argued that only the magnates were capable of implementing reforms. Szechenyi favored a strong link with the Habsburg Empire and called for the abolition of entail and serfdom, taxation of landowners, financing of development with foreign capital, the establishment of a national bank, and introduction of wage labor. He inspired such projects as the construction of the Széchenyi Chain Bridge linking Buda and Pest. Szechenyi's reform initiatives ultimately failed because they were targeted at the magnates, who were not inclined to support change, and because the pace of his program was too slow to attract disgruntled lesser nobles.

The most popular of Hungary's great reform leaders, Lajos Kossuth, addressed passionate calls for change to the lesser nobles. Kossuth was the son of a landless, lesser nobleman of Protestant background. He practiced law with his father before moving to Pest. There he published commentaries on the Diet's activities, which made him popular with young, reform-minded people. Kossuth was imprisoned in 1836 for treason. After his release in 1840, he gained quick notoriety as the editor of a liberal party newspaper. Kossuth argued that only political and economic separation from Austria would improve Hungary's plight. He called for broader parliamentary democracy, rapid industrialization, general taxation, economic expansion through exports, and the abolition of privileges (equality before the law) and serfdom. But Kossuth was also a Hungarian patriotic whose rhetoric provoked the strong resentment of Hungary's minority ethnic groups. Kossuth gained support among liberal lesser nobles, who constituted an opposition minority in the Diet. They sought reforms with increasing success after Francis's death in 1835 and the succession of Ferdinand V (1835–48). In 1844 a law was enacted making Hungarian the country's exclusive official language.

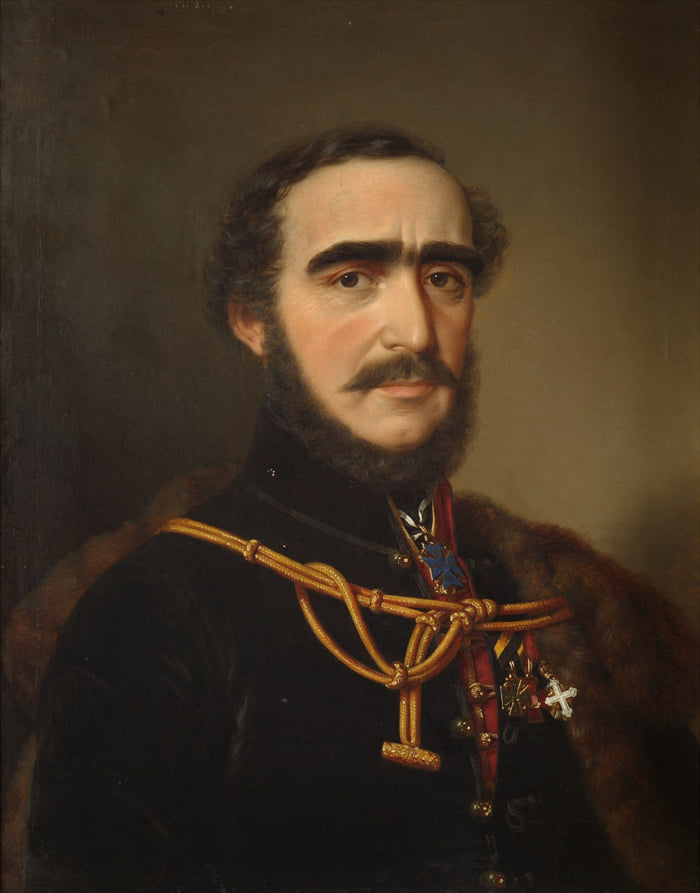
István Széchenyi, the first great figure of the reform era

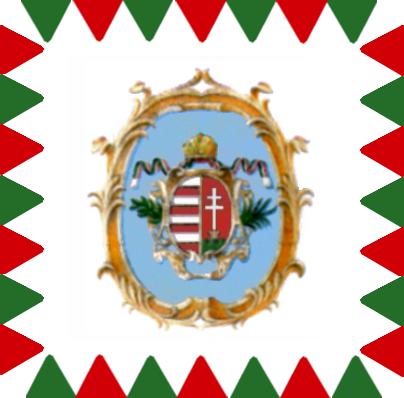
Revolutionary flag, 1848–49

Arms of Hungary, 1849

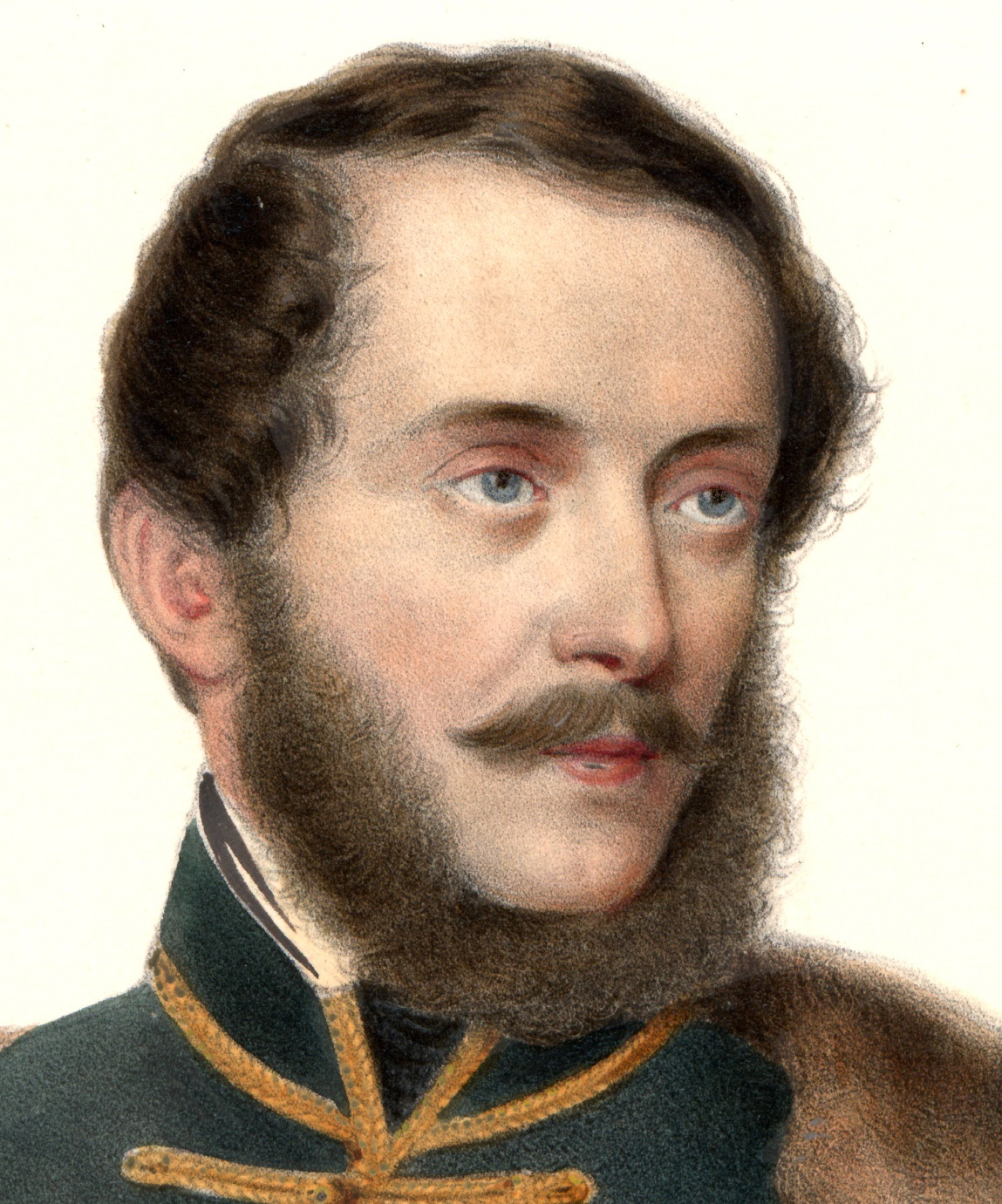
Lajos Kossuth, the most popular of Hungary's great reform leaders

== 1848–1867 ==
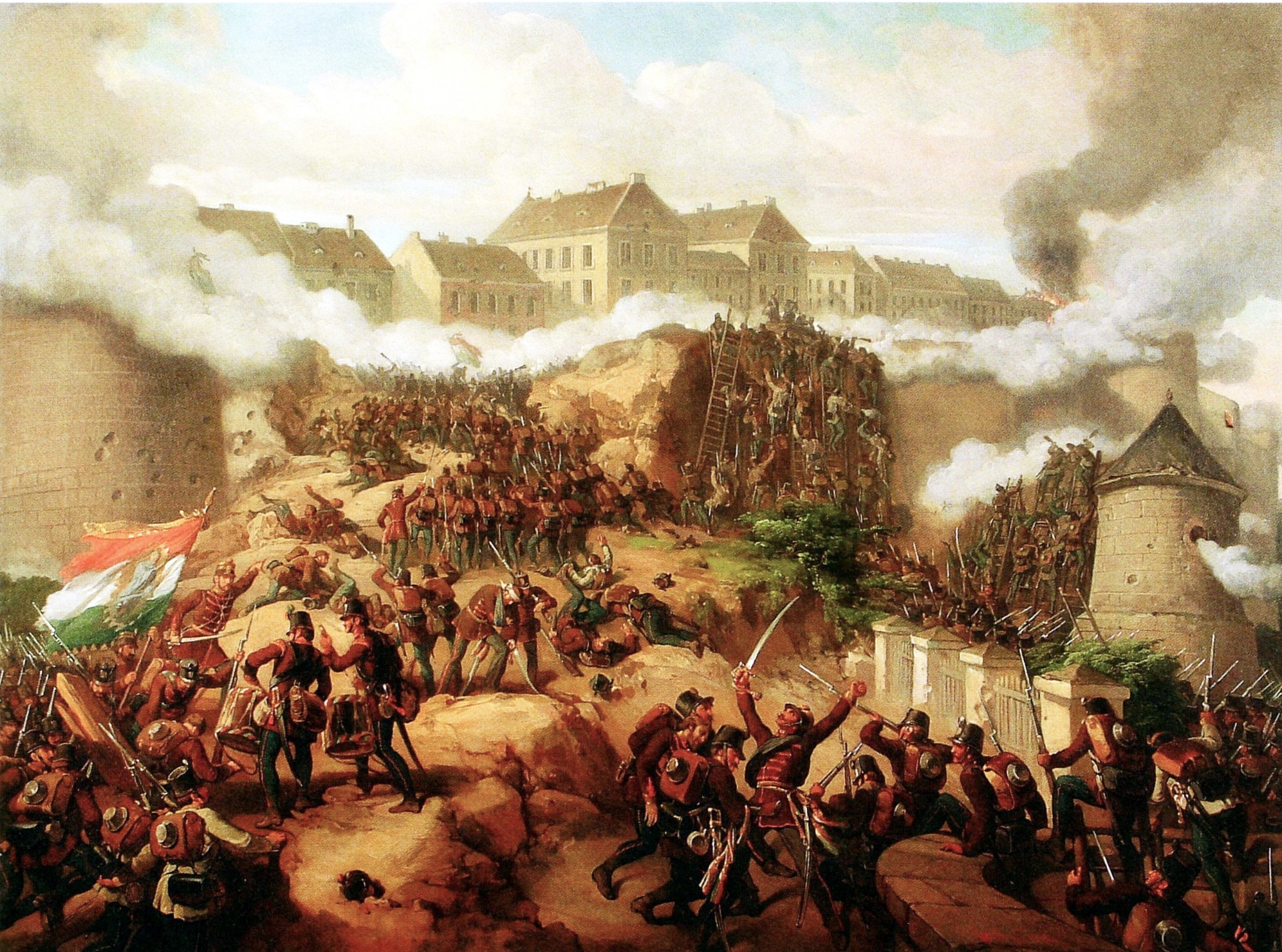
The Battle of Buda in May 1849 by Mór Than

After the Hungarian Revolution of 1848, the emperor revoked Hungary's constitution and assumed absolute control. Emperor Franz Joseph divided the country into four distinct territories: Hungary, Transylvania, Croatia-Slavonia, and Vojvodina (also known as the Banat). German and Bohemian administrators managed the government, and German became the language of administration and higher education. The non-Magyar minorities of Hungary received little for their support of Austria during the turmoil. A Croat reportedly told a Hungarian: "We received as a reward what the Magyars got as a punishment."

Hungarian public opinion split over the country's relations with Austria. Some Hungarians held out hope for full separation from Austria; others wanted an accommodation with the Habsburgs, provided that they respected Hungary's constitution and laws. Ferenc Deák became the main advocate for accommodation. Deak upheld the legality of the April laws and argued that their amendment required the Hungarian Diet's consent. He also held that the dethronement of the Habsburgs was invalid. As long as Austria ruled absolutely, Deak argued, Hungarians should do no more than passively resist illegal demands.

The first crack in Franz Joseph's neo-absolutist rule developed in 1859, when the forces of Sardinia-Piedmont and France defeated Austria at the Battle of Solferino. The defeat convinced Franz Joseph that national and social opposition to his government was too strong to be managed by decree from Vienna. Gradually he recognized the necessity of concessions towards Hungary, and Austria and Hungary thus moved towards a compromise.

In 1866 the Prussians defeated the Austrians in the Austro-Prussian War, further underscoring the weakness of the Habsburg Empire. Negotiations between the emperor and the Hungarian leaders were intensified and finally resulted in the Compromise of 1867, which created the Dual Monarchy of Austria-Hungary, also known as the Austro-Hungarian Empire.

== Demography ==
Ethnic groups of the Kingdom of Hungary according to Hungarian statistician Elek Fényes	Number c. 1840	Percent
Magyars (including Gypsies (75,107) because they speak Hungarian)	4,812,759	37.36 %
Slavs (Slovaks, Rusyns, Bulgarians, Serbs, Croats, etc.)	4,330,165	33.62 %
Vlachs	2,202,542	17.1 %
Germans (Transylvanian Saxons, Danube Swabians, etc.)	1,273,677	9.89 %
Jews	244,035	1.89 %
French (mostly from Lorraine and Alsace)	6,150	0.05 %
Greeks	5,680	0.04 %
Armenians	3,798	0.03 %
Albanians	1,600	0.01 %
Total	12,880,406	100 %

== See also ==
- List of Hungarian rulers
