= John Sigismund Zápolya =

Disputed King of Hungary from 1540 to 1551 and 1556 to 1570

John II Sigismund
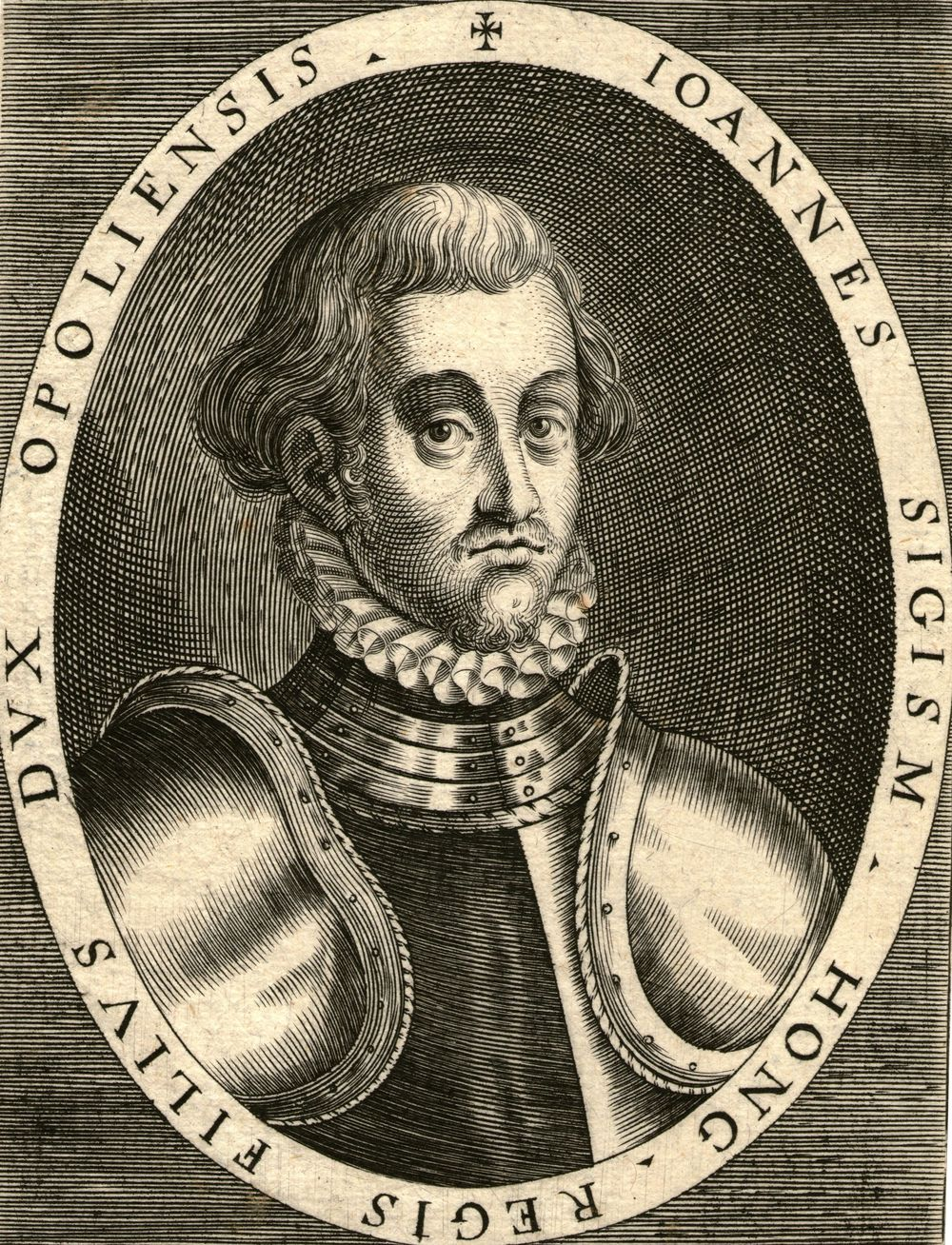
- Engraving by Dominicus Custos, c. 1600

King of Hungary
- 1st reign: 13 September 1540 – 19 July 1551
- Predecessor: John I
- Successor: Ferdinand I
- 2nd reign: 25 November 1556 – 16 August 1570
- Predecessor: Ferdinand I
- Successor: Maximilian
- Regent: Isabella Jagiellon

Prince of Transylvania
- Reign: 1570–1571
- Successor: Stephen Báthory

Duke of Opole and Racibórz
- Reign: 1551–1556
- Regent: Isabella Jagiellon
- Born: 7 July 1540; Buda, Kingdom of Hungary
- Died: 14 March 1571 (aged 30); Gyulafehérvár, Transylvania (now Alba Iulia, Romania)
- Burial: St. Michael's Cathedral; Gyulafehérvár, Transylvania (now Alba Iulia, Romania)
- House: Zápolya
- Father: John Zápolya
- Mother: Isabella Jagiellon
- Religion: Roman Catholic (1540–1562); Lutheran (1562–1564); Calvinist (1564–1568); Unitarian (1568–1571)

John Sigismund Zápolya or Szapolyai (Hungarian: Szapolyai János Zsigmond; 7 July 1540 – 14 March 1571) was King of Hungary as John II from 1540 to 1551 and from 1556 to 1570, and the first Prince of Transylvania, from 1570 to his death. He was the only son of John I, King of Hungary, and Isabella of Poland. John I ruled parts of the Kingdom of Hungary with the support of the Ottoman Sultan Suleiman; the remaining areas were ruled by Ferdinand I of Habsburg, who also ruled Austria and Bohemia. The two kings concluded a peace treaty in 1538 acknowledging Ferdinand's right to reunite Hungary after John I's death, though shortly after John Sigismund's birth, and on his deathbed, John I bequeathed his realm to his son. The late king's staunchest supporters elected the infant John Sigismund king, but he was not crowned with the Holy Crown of Hungary.

Suleiman invaded Hungary under the pretext of protecting John Sigismund from Ferdinand. Buda, the capital of Hungary, fell to the Ottomans without opposition in 1541, but Suleiman allowed the dowager queen, Isabella, to retain the territory east of the river Tisza on John Sigismund's behalf. Isabella and John Sigismund moved to Lippa (now Lipova in Romania). Before long, they took up residence in Gyulafehérvár in Transylvania (Alba Iulia in Romania). John Sigismund's realm was administered by his father's treasurer, George Martinuzzi, who sought to reunite Hungary under the rule of Ferdinand. Martinuzzi forced Isabella to renounce her son's realm in exchange for two Silesian duchies and 140,000 florins in 1551. John Sigismund and his mother settled in Poland, but she continued to negotiate for John Sigismund's restoration with Ferdinand's enemies.

Ferdinand was unable to protect eastern Hungary against the Ottomans. At Suleiman's urging, the Transylvanian Diet in 1556 persuaded John Sigismund and his mother to return to Transylvania, where she ruled her son's realm until her death in 1559. A wealthy lord, Melchior Balassa, rebelled against John Sigismund in late 1561, and Ferdinand gained control of most counties outside Transylvania. The Székely people, whose liberties had been restricted in the 1550s, also rose up against John Sigismund, but he crushed the rebellion. During the ensuing war against the Habsburgs, the Ottomans supported John Sigismund, and he paid homage to Suleiman in Zemun in 1566. The 1568 Treaty of Adrianople concluded the war, confirming John Sigismund in the eastern territories of the medieval Kingdom of Hungary (Transylvania and "Partium").

John Sigismund initiated a series of theological debates among the representatives of the concurring theological schools of the Reformation in the 1560s. He converted from Catholicism to Lutheranism in 1562 and from Lutheranism to Calvinism in 1564. Around five years later, accepting the Anti-Trinitarian views of his physician, Giorgio Biandrata and court preacher Ferenc Dávid, he became the only Unitarian monarch in history. In 1568, the Diet passed the Edict of Torda (now Turda in Romania), which emphasized that "faith is a gift of God" and prohibited the persecution of people for religious reasons. The edict expanded the limits of freedom of religion beyond the standards of late 16th-century Europe. John Sigismund abandoned the title "elected king of Hungary" in the Treaty of Speyer in 1570. Thereafter, he styled himself "Prince of Transylvania and Lord of Parts of the Kingdom of Hungary". He died childless. The Catholic Stephen Báthory succeeded him.

== Family ==
John Sigismund's father, John Zápolya, was the wealthiest Hungarian lord in the early 16th century. After the Ottoman Sultan, Suleiman the Magnificent, inflicted a crushing defeat on the Hungarian army in the Battle of Mohács, the majority of the noblemen elected John Zápolya king in 1526. However, a group of influential lords proclaimed Ferdinand I, Archduke of Austria, king in the same year. Hungary fell into a civil war that lasted for decades.

John paid homage to Suleiman at Mohács in 1529 to secure Ottoman support against Ferdinand. However, neither John nor Ferdinand could win control of the whole country during the next years. To conclude the civil war, the two kings' envoys signed the Treaty of Várad on 24 February 1538, which confirmed both kings' right to retain the lands that they held. John, who was childless, also acknowledged Ferdinand's right to take control of his realm (the central and eastern part of the Kingdom of Hungary) after his death. John also stipulated, if he fathered a son, his son would inherit his ancestral domains. Ferdinand, however, proved unable to protect John's realm against an Ottoman invasion. At age 52 John married Isabella Jagiellon, the 20-year-old daughter of Sigismund I the Old, King of Poland, on 2 March 1539. The humanist scholars Paolo Giovio and Antun Vrančić emphasized that Isabella was one of the most educated women of their age.

John Sigismund was born in Buda on 7 July 1540. On learning of his birth, his father, who was on campaign in Transylvania, rode to his soldiers' camp to inform them of the good news. The following day John fell ill, and he died on 21 or 22 July. Before his death he persuaded those present at his death bed to take an oath that they would prevent the transfer of his realm to Ferdinand.

== Childhood ==
=== Accession ===
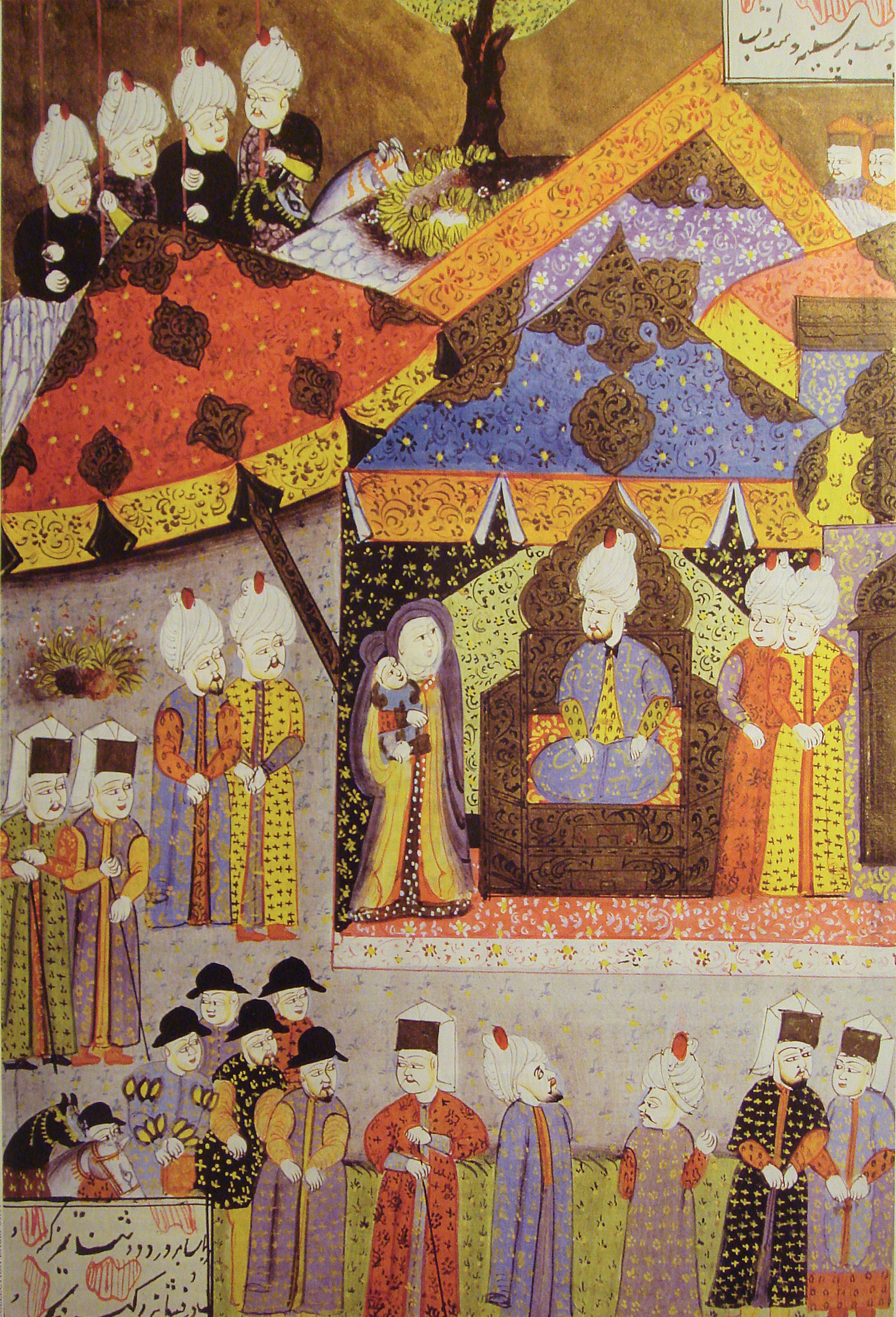
The Ottoman Sultan Suleiman the Magnificent receives Queen Isabella and John Sigismund at Buda on 29 August 1541

Soon after John Zápolya died, his treasurer, George Martinuzzi, hurried to Buda to secure John Sigismund's inheritance. On Martinuzzi's proposal, the Diet of Hungary elected John Sigismund king on 13 September 1540, but he was not crowned with the Holy Crown of Hungary. The Diet proclaimed Queen Isabella and George Martinuzzi, along with two powerful lords, Péter Petrovics and Bálint Török, the guardians of the infant monarch.

In August, Ferdinand's envoys had demanded the transfer of the late John Zápolya's realm to Ferdinand in accordance with the Treaty of Várad. Peter Perényi, who had been the commander of Zápolya's troops in Upper Hungary, and Franjo Frankopan, Archbishop of Kalocsa, soon deserted to Ferdinand. The wealthy Stephen Majláth expelled most of John Sigismund's supporters from Transylvania in an attempt to seize the province for himself. Ferdinand's envoy, Hieronymus Łaski, informed Suleiman of the Treaty of Várad, asking the sultan to consent to the unification of Hungary under Ferdinand's rule. Instead, the sultan stated that he supported John Sigismund and had Łaski arrested.

Ferdinand's army seized Visegrád, Vác, Pest, Tata and Székesfehérvár in October, but could not capture Buda. His military commander, Wilhelm von Roggendorf, again laid siege to Buda on 4 May 1541. Suleiman left Istanbul at the head of a large army in June to take advantage of the new civil war in Hungary. On his command, Petru Rareș, Prince of Moldavia, captured Stephen Majláth and forced the Transylvanian Diet to swear fealty to John Sigismund in late July. Roggendorf lifted the siege of Buda before Suleiman reached the town on 26 August.

Suleiman said that he had come to protect John Sigismund's interests, but also announced that he wanted to see the infant king, because he had heard rumours about Isabella's having actually given birth to a daughter. Six Hungarian lords (including George Martinuzzi and Bálint Török) accompanied John Sigismund to the sultan's camp on 29 August. During the meeting, janissaries entered Buda, saying that they wanted to see the town. This turned out to be a trick that enabled them to seize the capital of Hungary without opposition. Bálint Török was captured in the sultan's camp. Suleiman declared that John Sigismund could retain the territories to the east of the river Tisza in exchange for a yearly tribute of 10,000 florins.

=== First rule ===
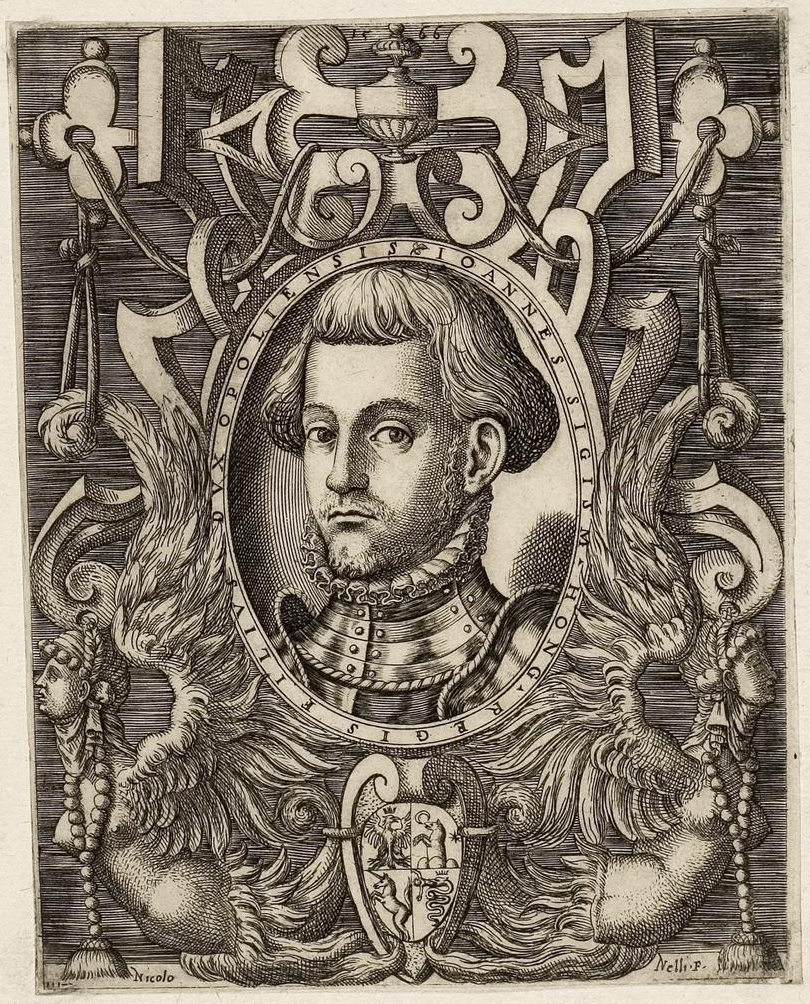
John Sigismund (Klebebände, 1566)

Isabella and Martinuzzi left Buda on 5 September 1541, taking John Sigismund and the Holy Crown with them. She and her son settled in Lippa, which was the center of an old domain of the Zápolya family. The delegates of the counties of John Sigismund's realm met in Debrecen on 18 October. They swore fealty to him and acknowledged the sultan's suzerainty. Martinuzzi signed a treaty with Ferdinand I's representative, Caspar Serédy, in Gyalu (now Gilău in Romania) on 29 December. According to the Treaty of Gyalu, Hungary was to be reunited under the rule of Ferdinand, but John Sigismund's right to the Zápolyas' domains in Upper Hungary was confirmed.

On 29 March 1542, the "Three Nations of Transylvania" urged Isabella to move from Lippa (which was located near the Ottoman Empire) to Transylvania. After John Statileo, Bishop of Transylvania, died in April, the Diet granted the domains of the bishopric to the royal family. Isabella and John Sigismund moved to Gyulafehérvár in June, taking up residence in the bishops' castle.

The Transylvanian Diet confirmed the Treaty of Gyalu in August. The representatives of the noblemen of the Partium (the counties between the Tisza and Transylvania) also consented to a war against the Ottoman Empire in November. However, the Habsburgs' army was unable to recapture Pest or defeat the Ottomans. Caspar Serédy came to Gyalu to take possession of John Sigismund's realm on Ferdinand's behalf, but Isabella refused him on 17 December. Three days later, the Diet declared the Treaty of Gyalu null and void, over the objections of the delegates of the Transylvanian Saxons.

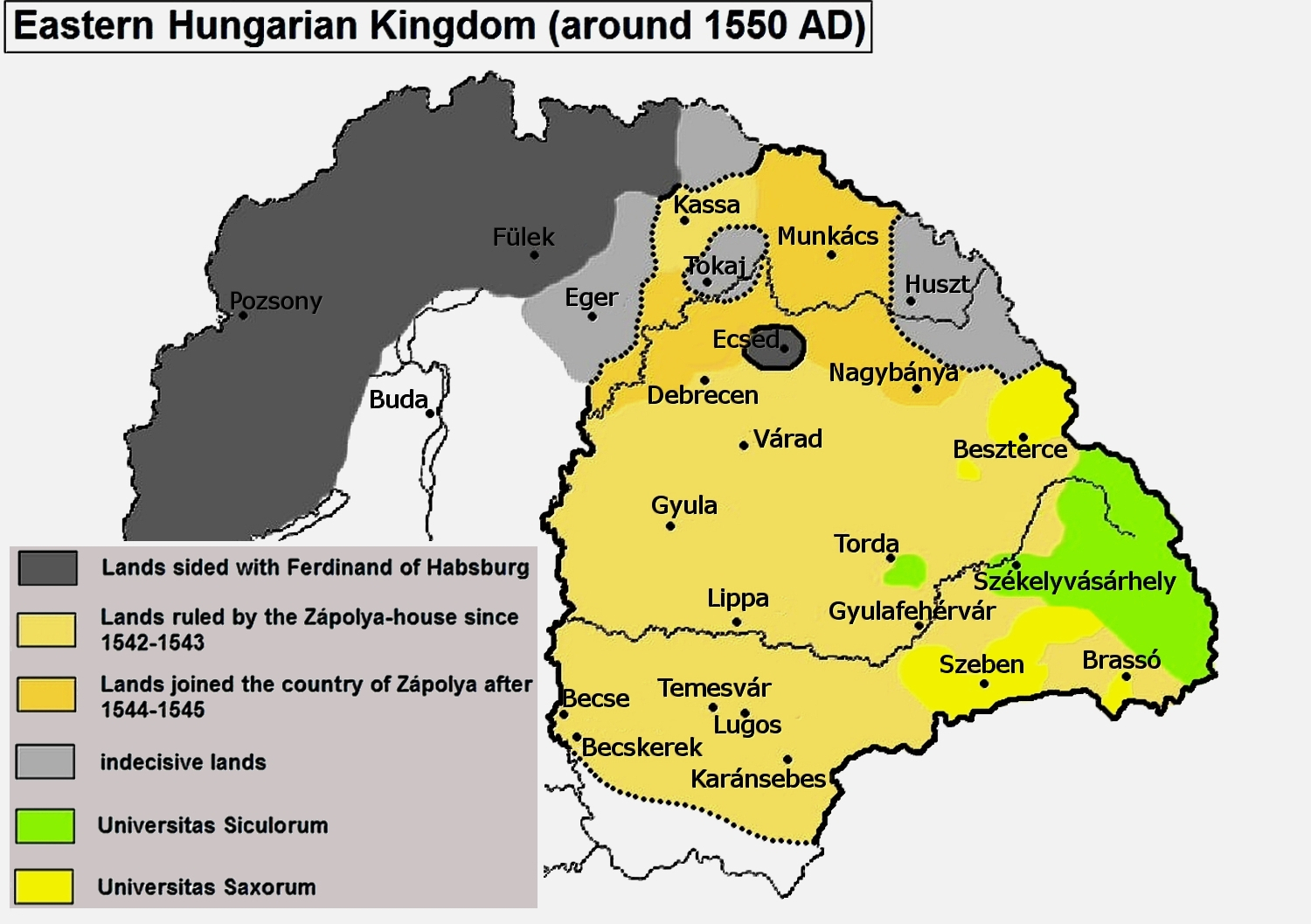
John Sigismund's realm around 1550

The relationship between Isabella and Martinuzzi was tense. Martinuzzi continued to control state administration and finance even after the Diet confirmed Isabella's superior position in February 1543. The first tribute from John Sigismund's realm was sent to the Ottoman Sultan in June. In the same month, Saxon clergymen from Kronstadt (now Brașov in Romania), who had adopted Lutheranism, participated in a debate with Catholic priests in the presence of the queen and Martinuzzi in Gyulafehérvár. The Saxons were allowed to leave, although Martinuzzi, who was bishop of Várad, wanted to bring them before court on charges of heresy. In April 1544, the Diet of Torda prescribed that travellers should respect the religious customs of the settlements they visited, showing that the ideas of the Reformation had spread to the whole province.

The first Transylvanian Diet at which delegates from the Partium were present met in August 1544. At the Diet, Martinuzzi was made chief justice. Five counties that had previously accepted Ferdinand's rule – Bereg, Szabolcs, Szatmár, Ung and Zemplén – swore allegiance to John Sigismund before the end of 1555.

The Ottomans laid claim to two fortresses, Becse and Becskerek (now Novi Bečej and Zrenjanin in Serbia), in early 1546. The sultan refused to include John Sigismund's realm in the peace treaty that he concluded with Ferdinand's brother, Emperor Charles V, in 1547. Both actions suggested that Suleiman intended to seize part of John Sigismund's kingdom, prompting Isabella and Martinuzzi to reopen negotiations with Ferdinand on the reunification of Hungary in 1548. Martinuzzi and Ferdinand's envoy, Nicolaus of Salm, signed a treaty in Nyírbátor on 8 September 1549. According to their agreement, Isabella and John Sigismund were to abdicate in exchange for the Silesian duchies of Opole and Racibórz and 100,000 florins in compensation. Isabella refused to execute the treaty and remained in Gyulafehérvár. Martinuzzi laid siege to the town, forcing her to give up resistance in October 1550.

Isabella and her supporters Péter Petrovics and Ferenc Patócsy made a new attempt to prevent the execution of the Treaty of Nyírbátor in May 1551, but Martinuzzi defeated them. Under duress, Isabella abdicated in favor of Ferdinand on John Sigismund's behalf, in return for the two Silesian duchies and 140,000 florins on 19 July. Two days later, she surrendered the Holy Crown to Ferdinand's representative, Giovanni Battista Castaldo. The Diet acknowledged their abdication and swore fealty to Ferdinand on 26 July.

=== In exile ===
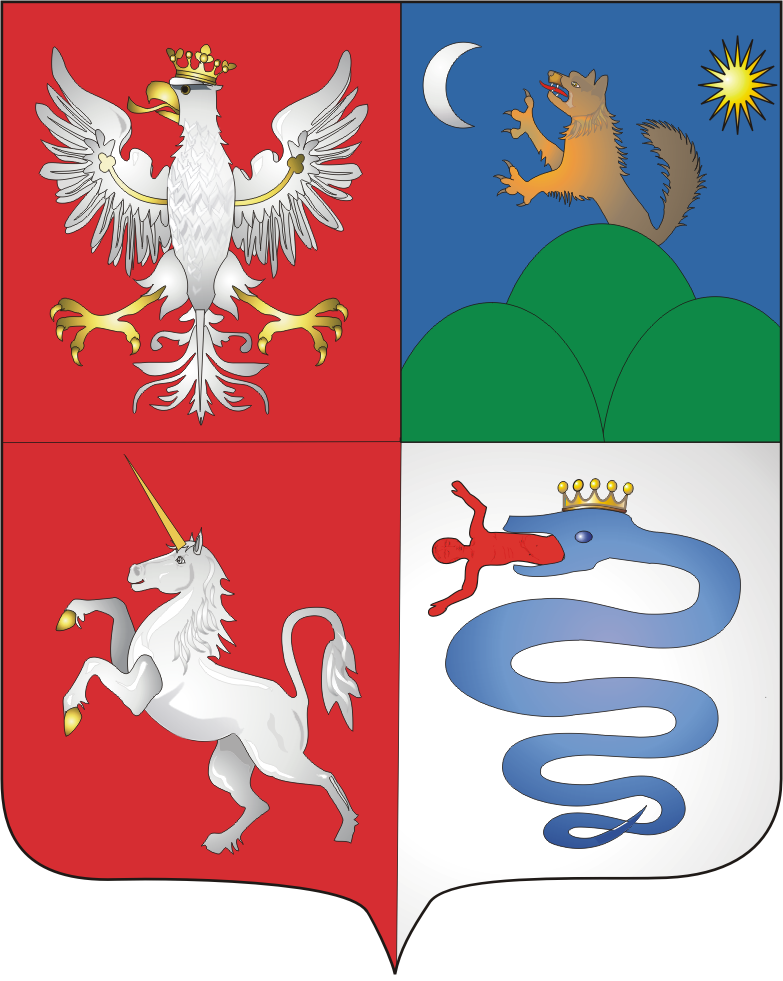
Coat-of-arms of John II Sigismund

Isabella and John Sigismund left Transylvania on 6 August 1551, accompanied by Péter Petrovics. They settled in Kassa (now Košice in Slovakia), and moved to Opole in March 1552. Realizing that the Silesian duchies were poor, they left for Poland before the end of April. During the following years they lived in Kraków, Warsaw, Sanok, and other Polish towns. John Sigismund often went hunting for bison and regularly visited his uncle, Sigismund II Augustus, King of Poland. However, his health was delicate because he suffered from epilepsy and chronic intestinal disorders.

The contemporaneous historian Ferenc Forgách, who was Isabella's implacable enemy, accused her of bringing her son up "shamefully", allowing him to keep bad company and drink. John Sigismund's tutors were actually humanist scholars: the Hungarian Mihály Csáky and the Polish Wojciech Nowopołski. Nowopołski aroused John Sigismund's interest in theological debates.

Ferdinand's rule remained fragile in the eastern territories of the Kingdom of Hungary because he did not send enough mercenaries to defend them. Suspecting that Martinuzzi was conspiring with the Ottomans, Castaldo had Martinuzzi murdered in late 1551. The Ottomans occupied the lowlands of Banat in the summer of 1552.

In March 1553 Suleiman urged Isabella to return to Hungary. Péter Petrovics rose against Ferdinand, and an assembly of the Székely people declared their loyalty to John Sigismund. However, both uprisings were crushed before the end of September. Deciding in April 1554 that Hungary should be restored to John Sigismund, Suleiman allowed Péter Petrovics to take control of two fortresses in Banat. Henry II of France, engaged in war against the Habsburgs, also urged Isabella to return to Hungary, promising one of his daughters in marriage to John Sigismund.

Suleiman sent messages to the Transylvanian lords in 1555, demanding they obey John Sigismund without resistance. Before the end of the year, the representatives of the Three Nations petitioned Ferdinand either to send reinforcements or to absolve them from their oath of fealty. Petrovics stormed into Transylvania in early 1556. The Diet swore an oath of fealty to John Sigismund on 12 March 1556, referring to him as "the son of King John". The envoys of the Diet departed for Poland on 1 June to persuade Isabella and her son to return. Two weeks later, Ferdinand informed Suleiman that he was ready to withdraw his troops from John Sigismund's former realm.

=== Return ===
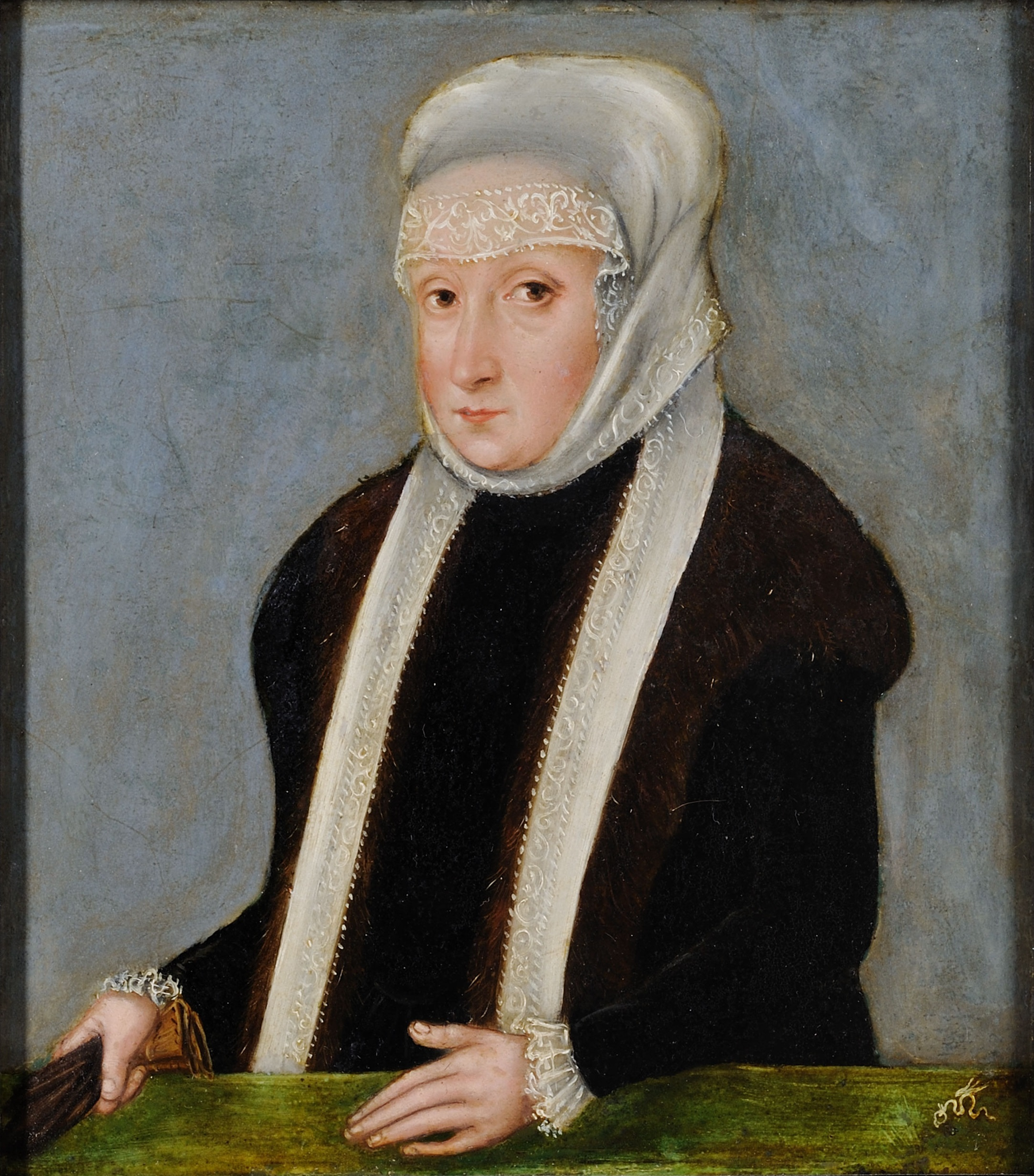
John Sigismund's mother, Isabella Jagiellon (a portrait by Lucas Cranach the Younger)

The representatives of the Three Nations received Isabella and John Sigismund with much pomp and ceremony in Kolozsvár (now Cluj-Napoca in Romania) on 22 October 1556. The Diet confirmed her right to administer state affairs in the name of her son, who was still a minor. In the following months several counties outside Transylvania (including Abaúj, Bihar, and Gömör) also acknowledged John Sigismund's rule.

Isabella adopted a tolerant religious policy, enabling the spread of Calvinism, especially in Partium and Kolozsvár. In 1559 she started new negotiations with Ferdinand, proposing to renounce her son's title of king if Ferdinand would agree to marry one of his daughters to John Sigismund and to confirm John Sigismund's rule in the lands to the east of the Tisza. However, the dowager queen died at the age of 40 on 18 September 1559.

== King-elect ==
=== Start of personal rule ===
John Sigismund's rule began with his mother's death. Rather than adopting a new title, he continued to style himself rex electus (king-elect). Mihály Csáky, Christopher and Stephen Báthory, and his mother's other advisors continued to participate in state administration. John Sigismund sent envoys to Ferdinand to propose marriage with one of Ferdinand's daughters, but also to announce his claim to the parts of Hungary under Ferdinand's rule. His demands were rejected, but peace was preserved.

John Sigismund showed a particular interest in religious matters and initiated several debates among the representatives of diverse theological schools. The first debate was held between Lutheran and Calvinist priests in Medgyes (now Mediaș in Romania) in January 1560. A year and a half later, John Sigismund sent letters to the University of Wittenberg and other theological centers in Germany to seek advice on the main points of the two Protestant schools of thought.

Melchior Balassa, one of the wealthiest lords in John Sigismund's realm, deserted to Ferdinand in December 1561. John Sigismund moved to seize Balassa's domains, but his army was routed at Hadad (now Hodod in Romania) on 4 March 1562. Stirred up by Balassa, the Székely commoners rose to restore their ancient liberties (including exemption from taxes), which had been restricted in the 1550s. John Sigismund's army routed them in May, and their leaders were impaled or mutilated. The Diet adopted new laws to restrict the privileges of the Székelys, including a ban on the employment of commoners as jurors. Two new royal castles named Székelytámad ("Székely-assault") and Székelybánja ("Székely-regret") were erected in the Székely Land. After Balassa's revolt, most counties outside Transylvania changed allegiance from John Sigismund to Ferdinand. To persuade Ferdinand to renounce the counties, John Sigismund even offered not to style himself king, but this was rejected in July 1562.

John Sigismund, originally Roman Catholic, converted to Lutheranism before the end of 1562. However, debates between Lutheran and Calvinist theologians continued. John Sigismund appointed his court physician, Giorgio Biandrata (who as an Anti-Trinitarian did not share either the Lutheran or the Calvinist view) to head a synod to reconcile the Lutheran and the Calvinist clergymen, but their differences proved insuperable in April 1564. The Diet acknowledged the existence of a separate Calvinist denomination in June. John Sigismund also adopted Calvinism and made Ferenc Dávid his court preacher.

=== Wars and debates ===
Ferdinand died on 25 July 1564, and his son Maximilian II succeeded him. The Transylvanian Diet declared war to reoccupy the counties that had been lost to the Habsburgs in 1562. John Sigismund's army seized Szatmár (now Satu Mare in Romania), Hadad and Nagybánya (now Baia Mare in Romania) before the end of 1562, but a counter-invasion by Lazarus von Schwendi reached the river Szamos in March 1565. The envoys of John Sigismund and Maximilian II concluded a treaty in Szatmár on 13 March 1565 in which John Sigismund renounced his title of king in return for the recognition of his hereditary rule in Transylvania John Sigismund was also to marry Maximilian II's sister, Joanna.

However, the Ottomans forced John Sigismund to declare the treaty null and void on 21 April. John Sigismund and Hasan, Pasha of Temesvár, joined forces and recaptured Erdőd (now Ardud in Romania), Nagybánya and Szatmár. He intended to see the sultan in Istanbul to give an explanation for the Treaty of Szatmár, but Suleiman informed him that he would personally come to Hungary.

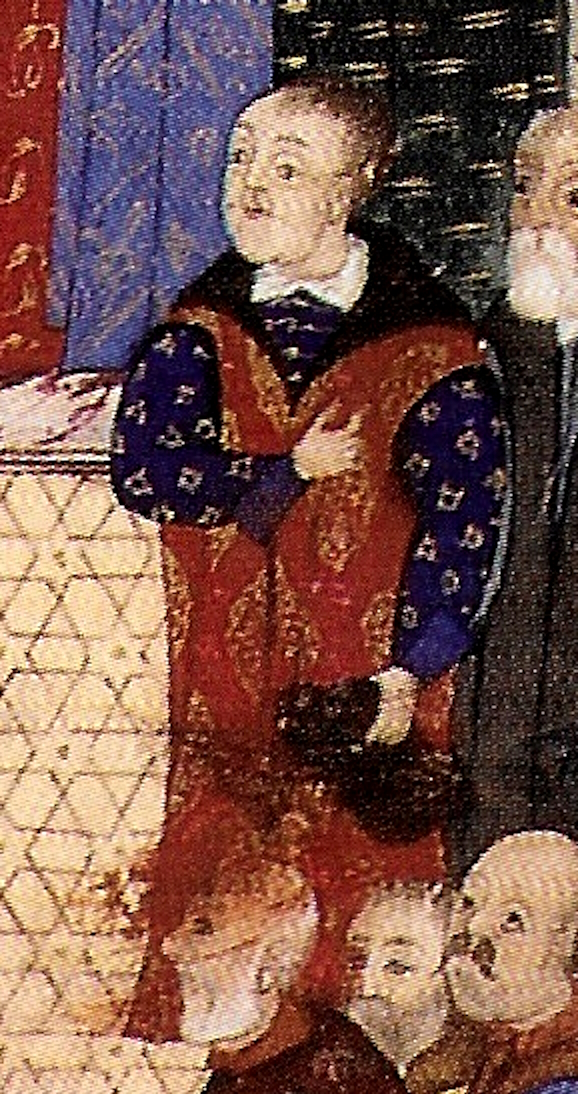
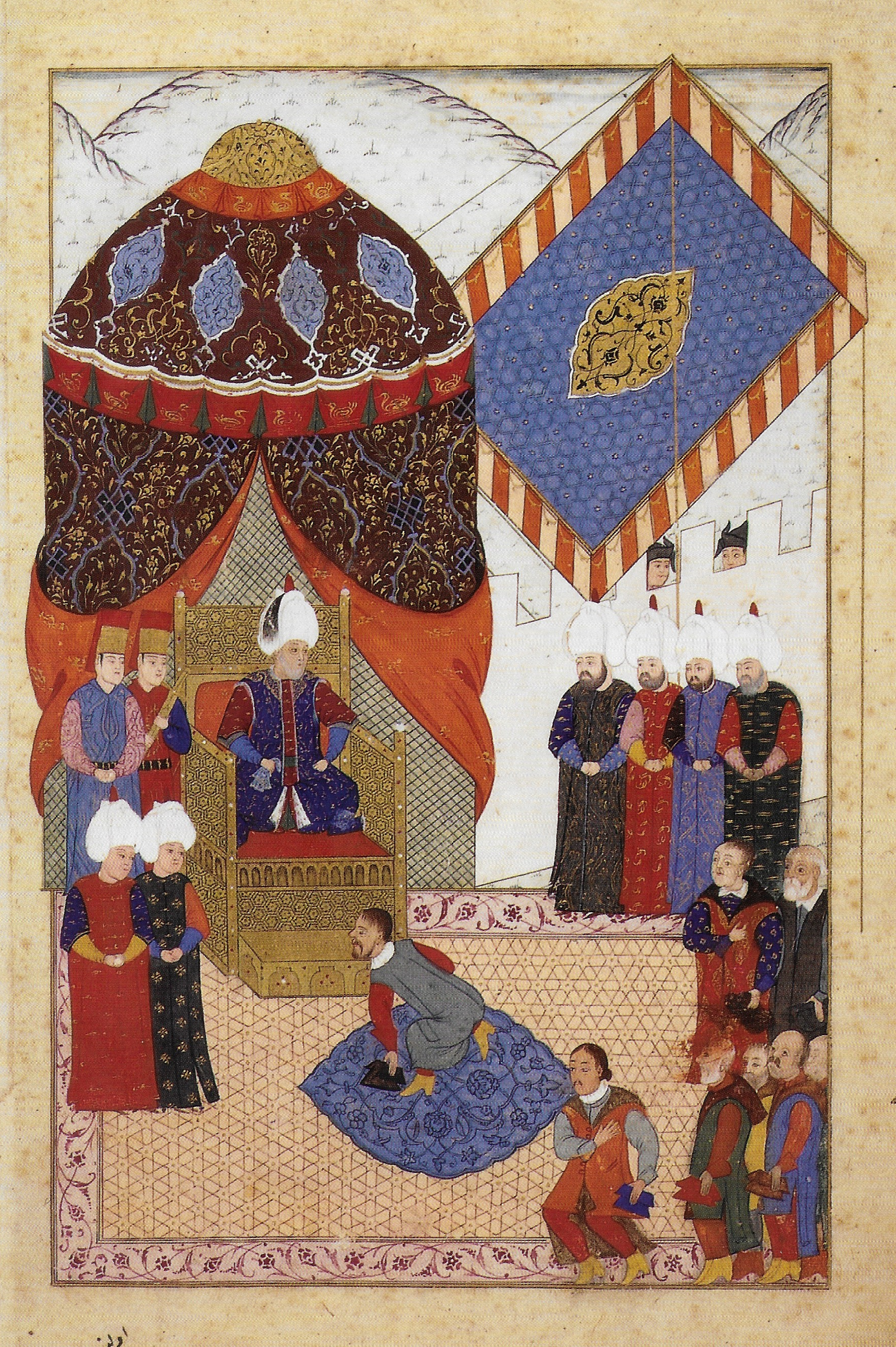
Likely real-life portrait of Janos Zsigmond paying hommage to Suleiman I near the town of Zemun on 29 June 1566. Painted by eyewitness Nakkaş Osman. History of the Szigetvár Campaign, 1568-69 (TSMK H.1339).

Ferenc Dávid began to include Anti-Trinitarian ideas in his sermons, which infuriated the Calvinist bishop of Debrecen, Péter Melius Juhász. John Sigismund organized an open debate about the doctrine of Trinity, which was held in Gyulafehérvár in April 1566. After the debate John Sigismund granted funds to the Calvinist publishing house in Debrecen. He also sponsored the establishment of Protestant colleges in Kolozsvár, Marosvásárhely (present-day Târgu Mureș in Romania) and Nagyvárad. His letters to Petrus Ramus and other leading scholars of the Reformation show that he wanted to develop the royal college in Gyulafehérvár into an academy. An anthology of Italian poems, published in Venice in the 1560s, hailed John Sigismund as "patron of the Renaissance".

Sultan Suleiman came to Zemun on the Danube in preparation for his campaign against Habsburg territories in the summer of 1566. John Sigismund hurried to the sultan's camp, accompanied by 400 Transylvanian lords. After John Sigismund and his principal advisors prostrated themselves before the sultan in his tent, Suleiman confirmed John Sigismund's position as hereditary ruler. According to the eyewitness Mustafa Selaniki, the sultan addressed John Sigismund as his "beloved son".

John Sigismund invaded Upper Hungary on the sultan's order on 28 July. However, when Suleiman died during the Siege of Szigetvár on 6 September, Sokollu Mehmed Pasha ordered John Sigismund to return to Transylvania. In a letter written about this time to Cosimo I, Duke of Florence, the mercenary Giovanandrea Gromo described John Sigismund as "extremely benevolent, gracious, subtle in thought, wise, level-headed, industrious [and] brave". Gromo mentioned that John Sigismund spoke Latin, Italian, German, Polish, Hungarian and Romanian well, and could also speak Greek and Turkish.

[John Sigismund] is of medium height and slender, with blond, silky hair and extremely fine, white skin. ... [H]is blue eyes gaze mildly and with benevolence ... His arms and hands are long and finely articulated, but powerful ... [H]e heartily enjoys every kind of hunting, both for large game ... and for hare and fowl. ... He enjoys training horses. ... He is very strong in battle with the lance ... [I]n archery few are his equal ... He runs and jumps better than average; he loves wrestling, even if many are superior to him ... [H]e loves music very much ... He plays the lute surpassing all but very few. ... [H]e tends more to cheerfulness than to melancholy ... He is opposed to suffering and only with great difficulty does he bring himself to mete out punishment ... Among his recognized fine qualities is his abstinent mode of life ...

— Giovanandrea Gromo's letter to Cosimo I de' Medici, Duke of Florence (1566 or 1567)

John Sigismund appointed a Calvinist bishop as the only religious leader of the Romanians in his realm in November 1566. The Diet also ordered that all Romanian priests who refused to convert to Calvinism were to be expelled, but this decision was not carried out. Influenced by Dávid and Biandrata, John Sigismund became receptive to Anti-Trinitarian ideas from early 1567. With John Sigismund's support, Dávid published five books to promote his views, reproving for idolatry those who accepted the dogma of the Trinity.

John Sigismund and Hasan Pasha stormed into Upper Hungary in March 1567. However, John Sigismund was taken seriously ill in summer. The Transylvanian lords pledged to respect his last will when electing his successor. The Ottoman Sultan Selim II granted the Transylvanian lords the right to freely elect their monarch, only preserving the right to approve their decision. Before long, John Sigismund recovered.

=== Freedom of religion ===
The Diet met again in Torda in early 1568 and authorized preachers to "teach the Gospel" according to their own understanding. The Diet also declared that nobody should "suffer at the hands of others for religious reasons", stating that "faith is a gift of God". The Edict of Torda expanded the limits of religious freedom far beyond the standard of 16th-century Europe. The decree did not put a complete end to discrimination, because official status was granted only to the Catholic, Lutheran, and Calvinist clergymen, but Unitarian, Orthodox, Armenian, Jewish, and Muslim believers could also freely practise their religions.

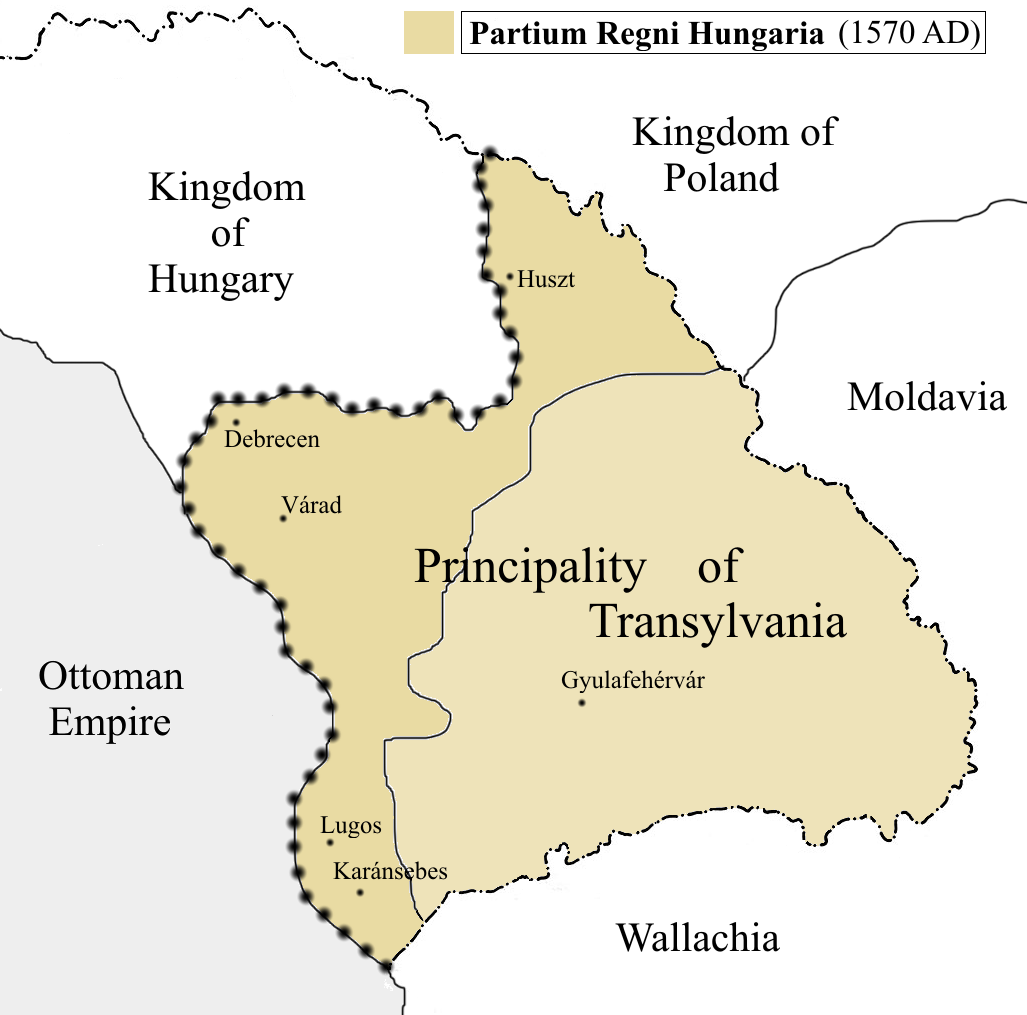
John Sigismund's realm in 1570

The Treaty of Adrianople, signed in February 1568, concluded the first war between the Ottoman Empire and the Habsburgs. According to the treaty, John Sigismund retained all territories that he had conquered from Maximilian II in the previous years. The envoy of the Ottoman Sultan Selim II in Paris suggested that John Sigismund should marry Margaret of Valois, but his proposal was ignored.

Many theological discussions on the Trinity were organized in 1568, the first of them taking place in his presence in Gyulafehérvár from 8 to 17 March. The growing influence of the Anti-Trinitarians on John Sigismund became obvious in 1569. After Péter Károlyi, a Calvinist cleric, complained about John Sigismund's bias, John Sigismund accused the Calvinist bishop, Melius, of having persecuted non-Calvinist priests, stating that Melius "should not play the pope". The largest debate between the Calvinist and Anti-Trinitarian, or Unitarian, theologians took place in Nagyvárad from 20 to 25 October 1569. Although neither side was declared winner, after the debate John Sigismund accepted Anti-Trinitarian ideas, which made him the only Unitarian monarch in history.

We wish that in our country ... freedom shall reign. We know furthermore that faith is a gift from God and that conscience cannot be constrained. And if [Peter Melius Juhász] does not abide by this, he may go to the other side of the Tisza.|John Sigismund's words to Péter Károlyi

After John Sigismund's conversion, most of his courtiers also adhered to Unitarianism. According to historian Gábor Barta, political factors also contributed to John Sigismund's conversion, because he "found in [Anti-Trinitarianism] the means through which he could express both his adherence to the Christian world and the distance from it". István Keul says that the simplicity of the idea that "There is but one God!" also contributed to the spread of Unitarianism, especially among the Székely villagers and the townspeople of Kolozsvár. A religious enthusiast, György Karácsony, stirred up many peasants in Partium to wage holy war against the Ottomans in 1569. They marched against Debrecen, but the neighboring noblemen routed them near the town in early 1570.

== Prince of Transylvania ==
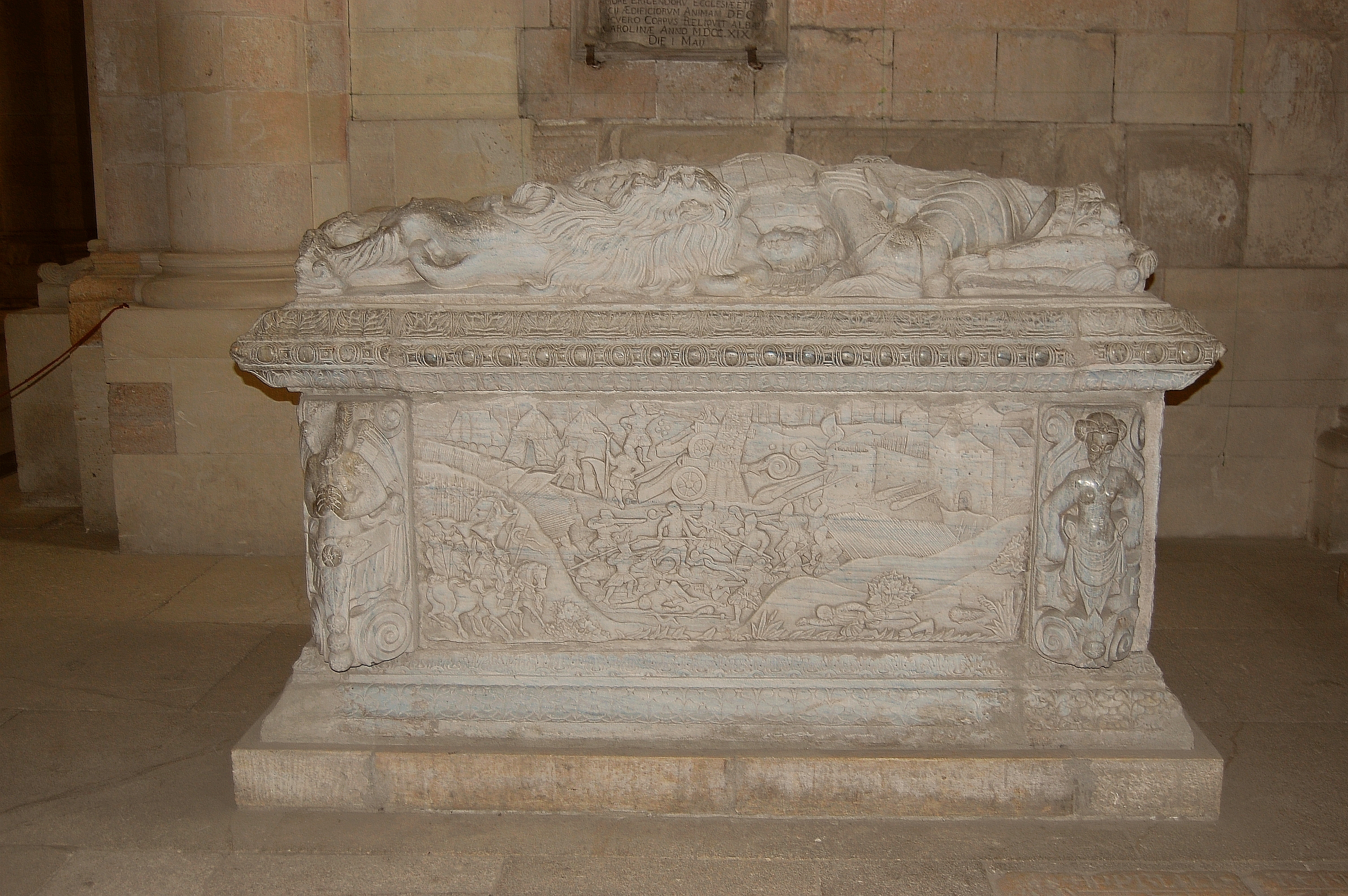
John Sigismund's tomb in St. Michael's Cathedral in Gyulafehérvár (now Alba Iulia in Romania)

Negotiations between John Sigismund and Maximilian II concluded with the Treaty of Speyer, signed on 16 August 1570. John Sigismund acknowledged Maximilian II as the sole king of Hungary and abandoned his own royal title. Instead, he adopted the new title "Prince of Transylvania and Lord of Parts of the Kingdom of Hungary", also confirming that his realm was part of the Kingdom of Hungary and would revert to Maximilian II or Maximilian II's heir after John Sigismund's death.

John Sigismund, now gravely ill, ratified the treaty on 1 December. The last Diet to meet during his reign confirmed the decrees of previous Diets enhancing religious freedom. He died in Gyulafehérvár on 14 March 1571, a few days after Maximilian II had ratified the Treaty of Speyer. The Transylvanian lords kept his death secret for days. He was buried in St. Michael's Cathedral in Gyulafehérvár, in accordance with Unitarian rite.

John Sigismund had made his last testament and will in the presence of Chancellor Mihály Csáky and Treasurer Gáspár Bekes during his earlier illness in the summer of 1567. Despite his recovery, he did not alter the text in the following years. He willed most of his wealth to his uncle, Sigismund August of Poland, and his three aunts, Sophia, Anna and Catherine. He bequeathed his library to the Protestant school of Gyulafehérvár.

John Sigismund, who never married and left no heir, was the last member of the Zápolya family. In his will, he assured the Diet of its right to choose the new monarch. The representatives of the Three Nations elected the Roman Catholic Stephen Báthory, who adopted the title Voivode of Transylvania. Gáspár Bekes, supported by Maximilian II, contested the election, but Báthory emerged victorious in the resulting civil war and consolidated his rule.

== Ancestors ==
Ancestors of John Sigismund Zápolya

16. John Zápolya
8. Ladislaus Vajdafi (+1453)
4. Stephen Zápolya
9. Katalin (from unknown family)
2. John Zápolya
20. Bolesław I of Cieszyn
10. Przemysław II of Cieszyn
21. Euphemia of Masovia
5. Hedwig of Cieszyn
22. Bolesław IV of Warsaw
11. Anna of Masovia
23. Barbara Aleksandrówna
1. John Sigismund Zápolya
24. Władysław II Jagiełło
12. Casimir IV of Poland
25. Sophia of Halshany
6. Sigismund I of Poland
26. Albert II of Germany
13. Elizabeth of Austria
27. Elizabeth of Luxembourg
3. Isabella Jagiellon
28. Galeazzo Maria Sforza
14. Gian Galeazzo Sforza
29. Bona of Savoy
7. Bona Sforza
30. Alfonso II of Naples
15. Isabella of Naples
31. Ippolita Maria Sforza

== Sources ==
- Barta, Gábor (1994). "The Emergence of the Principality and its First Crises (1526–1606)". In Köpeczi, Béla; Barta, Gábor; Bóna, István; Makkai, László; Szász, Zoltán; Borus, Judit (eds.). History of Transylvania. Akadémiai Kiadó. pp. 247–300. ISBN 963-05-6703-2.
- Barta, Gábor; Granasztói, György (1981). "A három részre szakadt ország és a török kiűzése (1526–1605)". In Benda, Kálmán; Péter, Katalin (eds.). Magyarország történeti kronológiája, II: 1526–1848 [Historical Chronology of Hungary, Volume I: 1526–1848] (in Hungarian). Akadémiai Kiadó. pp. 361–430. ISBN 963-05-2662-X.
- Cartledge, Bryan (2011). The Will to Survive: A History of Hungary. C. Hurst & Co. ISBN 978-1-84904-112-6.
- Engel, Pál (2001). The Realm of St Stephen: A History of Medieval Hungary, 895–1526. I.B. Tauris Publishers. ISBN 1-86064-061-3.
- Fehér, G. (1972). "Hungarian historical scenes recorded in Turkish chronicle illustrations". Acta Orientalia Academiae Scientiarum Hungaricae. XXV. Akadémiai Kiadó: 472–492. JSTOR 23657173.
- Felezeu, Călin (2009). "The International Political Background (1541–1699); The Legal Status of the Principality of Transylvania in Its Relations with the Ottoman Porte". In Pop, Ioan-Aurel; Nägler, Thomas; Magyari, András (eds.). The History of Transylvania, Vo. II (From 1541 to 1711). Romanian Academy, Center for Transylvanian Studies. pp. 15–73. ISBN 978-973-7784-04-9.
- Frost, Robert (2015). The Oxford History of Poland-Lithuania, VolumeI: The Making of the Polish-Lithuanian Union, 1385–1569. Oxford University Press. ISBN 978-0-19-820869-3.
- Harris, Mark W. (2009). The A to Z of Unitarian Universalism. Scarecrow Press. ISBN 978-0-8108-6817-5.
- Heckenast, Gusztáv (2005). "János Zsigmond végrendelete (1567)" (PDF). Keresztény Magvető (in Hungarian). 111 (4). Unitarian Church of Transylvania: 317–334.
- Keul, István (2009). Early Modern Religious Communities in East-Central Europe: Ethnic Diversity, Denominational Plurality, and Corporative Politics in the Principality of Transylvania (1526–1691). Brill. ISBN 978-90-04-17652-2.
- Kontler, László (1999). Millennium in Central Europe: A History of Hungary. Atlantisz Publishing House. ISBN 963-9165-37-9.
- Markó, László (2006). A magyar állam főméltóságai Szent Istvántól napjainkig: Életrajzi Lexikon [Great Officers of State in Hungary from King Saint Stephen to Our Days: A Biographical Encyclopedia] (in Hungarian). Helikon Kiadó. ISBN 963-547-085-1.
- Oborni, Teréz (2012). "Szapolyai (I) János; Jagelló Izabella; János Zsigmond". In Gujdár, Noémi; Szatmáry, Nóra (eds.). Magyar királyok nagykönyve: Uralkodóink, kormányzóink és az erdélyi fejedelmek életének és tetteinek képes története [Encyclopedia of the Kings of Hungary: An Illustrated History of the Life and Deeds of Our Monarchs, Regents and the Princes of Transylvania] (in Hungarian). Reader's Digest. pp. 152–155, 171–173. ISBN 978-963-289-214-6.
- Roxburgh, David J. (2005). Turks: a journey of a thousand years, 600-1600. London : New York: Royal Academy of Arts; Distributed in the U.S. and Canada by Harry N. Abrams. ISBN 978-1903973578.
- Szakály, Ferenc (1994). "The Early Ottoman Period, Including Royal Hungary". In Sugar, Peter F.; Hanák, Péter; Frank, Tibor (eds.). A History of Hungary. Indiana University Press. pp. 83–99. ISBN 963-7081-01-1.
- Szegedi, Edit (2009). "The Birth and Evolution of the Principality of Transylvania (1541–1690)". In Pop, Ioan-Aurel; Nägler, Thomas; Magyari, András (eds.). The History of Transylvania, Vo. II (From 1541 to 1711). Romanian Academy, Center for Transylvanian Studies. pp. 99–111. ISBN 978-973-7784-04-9.

John (II) Sigismund House of Zápolya Born: 18 July 1540 Died: 14 March 1571
Regnal titles
Preceded by John I	— DISPUTED — King of Hungary; 1540–1551; 1556–1570; Disputed by Ferdinand I and Maximilian	Relinquished claim
Vacant Royal domain Title last held by George Frederick	Duke of Opole and Racibórz; 1551–1556	Vacant Royal domain Title next held by Sigismund Báthory
New title	Prince of Transylvania; 1570–1571	Succeeded by Stephen Báthory
