= Treaty of Nagyvárad =

1538 agreement between claimants to the Hungarian throne

The Treaty of Nagyvárad (or Treaty of Grosswardein) was a secret peace agreement between Emperor Ferdinand I and John Zápolya, rival claimants to the Kingdom of Hungary, signed in Grosswardein / Várad (modern-day Oradea, Romania) on February 24, 1538. In the treaty, they divided Hungary between them according to the actual possession.

Ferdinand recognized Zápolya as John I, King of Hungary and ruler of two-thirds of the Kingdom, while Zápolya conceded the rule of Ferdinand over western Hungary, and recognized him as heir to the Hungarian throne, since Zápolya was childless.

But in 1540, just before Zápolya's death, his wife bore him a son, John Sigismund Zápolya, and the agreement failed. John Sigismund was elected King of Hungary as John II by the Hungarian nobility. Isabella asked Ottoman Sultan Suleyman I to help in the fight with Ferdinand and his successors that ensued, only to see Suleiman to prevail, declare John II a king, and placing himself as a regent. A large portion of Hungary became essentially a Turkish province, complete with Ottoman governor and garrison in Buda.

== See also ==
- List of treaties

== Sources ==
- Bohnstedt, John W. (1968). "The Infidel Scourge of God: The Turkish Menace as Seen by German Pamphleteers of the Reformation Era". Transactions of the American Philosophical Society. 58 (9). American Philosophical Society: 1–58. doi:10.2307/1006112. ISSN 0065-9746. JSTOR 1006112.
