= Wass =

Wass may refer to:

== People ==
- Wass de Czege, a Hungarian noble family in Transylvania

=== In arts and entertainment ===
- Albert Wass (1908–1998), Hungarian nobleman, forest engineer, novelist, poet and member of the Wass de Czege family
- Ashley Wass (born 1977), British classical pianist
- Chip Wass (born 1965), American illustrator, designer, and animator
- Julian Wass (born 1981), American film composer, producer and electronic musician
- Ted Wass (born 1952), American television director and former actor on the series Soap

=== In government ===
- Paul Wass (1925–2020), American politician
- János Wass (fl. 16th century), king of Hungary and Bohemia; illegitimate son of King Louis II
- Douglas Wass (1923–2017), British civil servant

=== In sport ===
- Ted Wass (footballer) (1910–1955), English footballer
- Thomas Wass, Nottinghamshire cricketer
- Daniel Wass (born 1989), Danish footballer
- George Wass (1882–1966), English cricketer
- Horace Wass (1903–1969), English sportsman
- Lennart Wass (born 1953), Swedish football manager

=== In other fields ===
- Angelitha Wass (fl. 15th–16th century), Hungarian lady's maid of Anne of Foix-Candale
- Niall Wass (born 1969), British businessman

== Other uses ==
- Wass, North Yorkshire, England, United Kingdom

== See also ==
- WASS (disambiguation)
- Was (disambiguation)
