= John Jagiellon =

John Jagiellon might refer to these members of the Jagiellon dynasty:

- John I Albert (1459–1501), King of Poland
- John of Lithuanian Dukes (1499–1538), Bishop of Vilnius and of Poznań (Posen), illegitimate son of Sigismund I the Old, King of Poland
- János Wass (ca. 1521–after 1580), illegitimate son of Louis II Jagiellon, King of Hungary and Bohemia
