= Jagiellonian dynasty =

Lithuanian dynasty that ruled Lithuania, Poland, Hungary and Bohemia

Jagiellons
- Parent house: Gediminids
- Country: Polish–Lithuanian Commonwealth; Grand Duchy of Lithuania; Kingdom of Poland; Kingdom of Hungary; Kingdom of Bohemia
- Founded: 1386
- Founder: Władysław II Jagiełło
- Final ruler: Anna Jagiellon of Poland–Lithuania
- Titles: King of Poland; Grand Duke of Lithuania; King of Hungary; King of Bohemia (and prince-elector); King of Dalmatia; King of Rama; King of Slavonia; King of Croatia; Duke of Silesia; Duke of Ruthenia; Duke of Luxembourg; Queen consort of Sweden
- Dissolution: 1596

The Jagiellonian dynasty (US: /ˌjɑːɡjəˈloʊniən/; US: /ˌjɑːɡəˈ-/; Lithuanian: Jogailaičių dinastija; Polish: dynastia jagiellońska), also known as the House of Jagiellon (Polish: Dom Jagiellonów) or simply the Jagiellons (Lithuanian: Jogailaičiai; Polish: Jagiellonowie; Latin: Iagellonidae), was a cadet branch of the Lithuanian ducal dynasty of Gediminids. The Jagiellons reigned in several European countries between the 14th and 16th centuries. Members of the dynasty were Kings of Poland (1386–1572), Grand Dukes of Lithuania (1377–1392 and 1440–1572), Kings of Hungary (1440–1444 and 1490–1526), and Kings of Bohemia and imperial electors (1471–1526).

The dynasty originated with Jogaila, the Grand Duke of Lithuania, who was baptized as Ladislaus (Polish: Władysław) in 1386, which paved the way to his ensuing marriage to the Queen Regnant (Note: Jadwiga was crowned King of Poland—Hedvig Rex Poloniae, not Hedvig Regina Poloniae.) Jadwiga of Poland, resulting in his ascension to the Crown of the Kingdom of Poland as Władysław II Jagiełło, (Note: Initially Władysław II Jagiełło reigned jure uxoris jointly with Jadwiga until her death.) and the effective promotion of his branch to a royal dynasty. The personal union between the Kingdom of Poland and the Grand Duchy of Lithuania (converted in 1569 with the Treaty of Lublin into the Polish–Lithuanian Commonwealth) is the reason for the common appellation "Poland–Lithuania" in discussions about the area from the Late Middle Ages onward. One Jagiellon, Władysław III of Poland, briefly ruled both Poland and Hungary (1440–1444), and two others ruled both Bohemia and Hungary (1490–1526) and then continued in the distaff line as a branch of the House of Habsburg.

The Polish "Golden Age", the period of the reigns of Sigismund I and Sigismund II, the last two Jagiellonian kings, or more generally the 16th century, is most often identified with the rise of the culture of Polish Renaissance. The cultural blossoming had its material base in the prosperity of the elites, both the landed nobility and urban patriciate at such centers as Kraków and Gdańsk. The Jagiellons were polyglots and per historical evidence Casimir IV Jagiellon and his son Saint Casimir possibly were the last Jagiellons who spoke in their patrilineal ancestors' Lithuanian language; however, even the last patrilineal Jagiellonian monarch Sigismund II Augustus maintained two separate and equally lavish Lithuanian-speaking and Polish-speaking royal courts in Lithuania's capital Vilnius.

At the end of the 15th century, the Jagiellonians reigned over vast territories stretching from the Baltic to the Black to the Adriatic Sea Grand Duchy of Lithuania Crown of the Kingdom of Poland Principality of Moldavia (Polish fief) State of the Teutonic Order (Polish fief) Kingdom of Bohemia Kingdom of Hungary

== Name ==
The name comes from Jogaila (Jagiełło), the first Grand Duke of Lithuania to become King of Poland. In Polish, the dynasty is known as Jagiellonowie and the patronymic form: Jagiellończyk; in Lithuanian it is called Jogailaičiai, in Belarusian Яґайлавічы (Jagajłavičy), in Ukrainian Яґайловичі (Yagaylovychi), in Hungarian Jagelló, in Croatian Jagelovići, in Slovak Jagelovci, and in Czech Jagellonci, as well as Jagello or Jagellon in Latin. Etymologically, the name Jogaila means "strong rider", from the Lithuanian words joti (to ride) and gailus (strong, powerful).

== Pre-dynasty background ==
The rule of Piasts, the earlier Polish ruling house (c. 962–1370) had ended with the death of King Casimir III the Great. Gediminids, the immediate predecessors of the first Jagiellonian, were rulers of medieval Lithuania with the title of Grand Duke. Their realm, the Grand Duchy of Lithuania, was chiefly inhabited by Lithuanians and Ruthenians.

Jogaila, the eponymous first ruler of the Jagiellonian dynasty, started as the Grand Duke of Lithuania. As a result of the Union of Krewo he then converted to Christianity and married the 12-year-old Queen Jadwiga of Poland (daughter of King Louis I of Hungary from the Angevins Dynasty). Thereby he became King of Poland as her co-ruler. Jadwiga died in 1399 and, as her and Jogaila's daughter, Princess Elizabeth, died as infant, Jogaila lost inheritance rights to Polish crown for his future descendants, but he remained the King of Poland as elected ruler. He eventually went to have 4 more children and started a Jagiellonian dynasty, whose members continued to be elected as monarchs of Poland.

== Kingdom of Poland ==
=== Jogaila and Władysław III ===
==== Polish–Lithuanian union ====
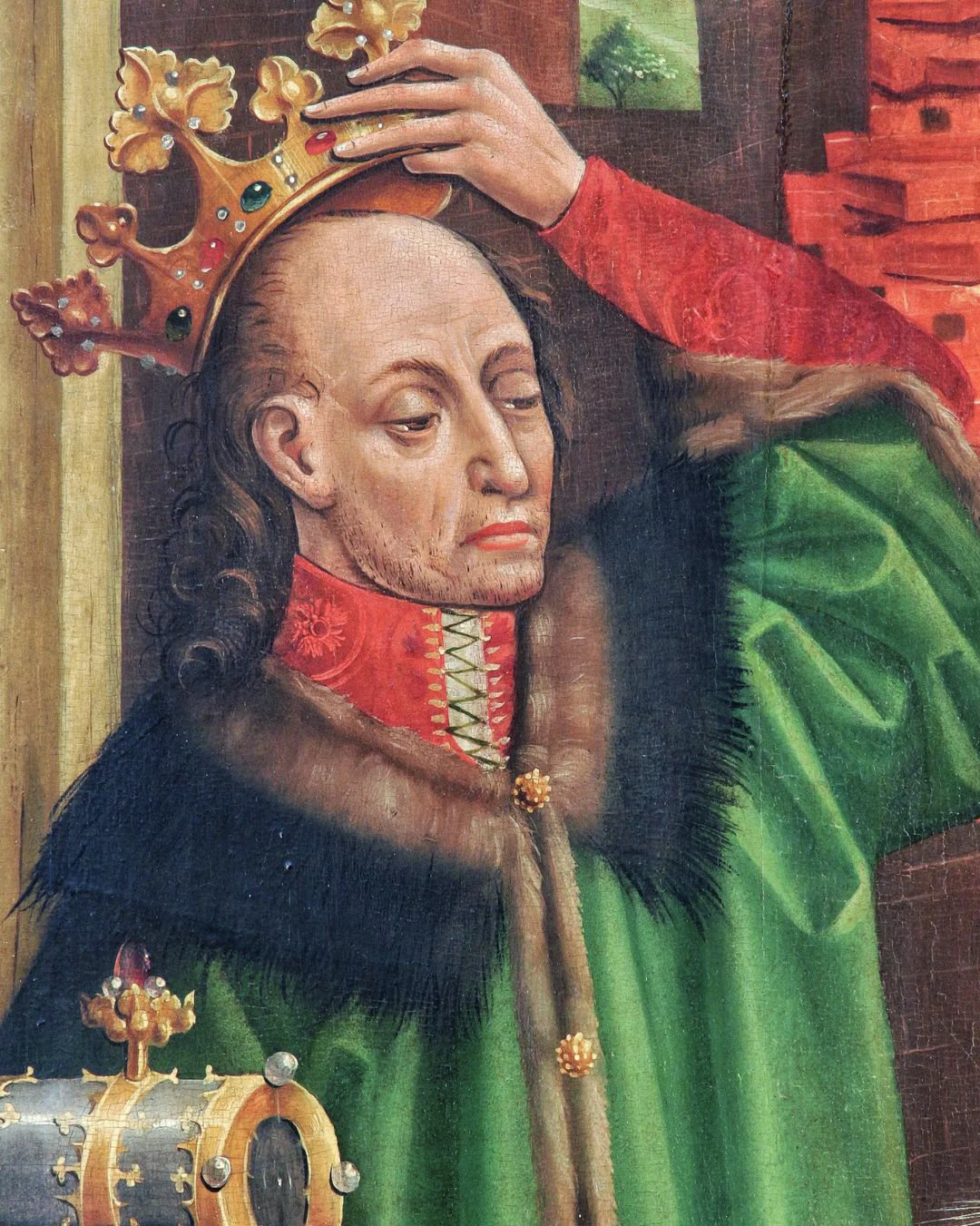
Jogaila, later Władysław II Jagiełło (c. 1352/1362 – 1 June 1434) was Grand Duke of Lithuania (1377–1434), King of Poland alongside his wife Jadwiga (1386–1399), and then sole King of Poland until his death.

In 1385 the Union of Krewo was signed between Queen Jadwiga of Poland and Jogaila, the Grand Duke of Lithuania, the last pagan state in Europe. The act arranged for Jogaila's baptism (after which Jogaila was known in Poland by his baptismal name Władysław, and the Polish version of his Lithuanian name, Jagiełło) (Zamoyski, the Polish Way) and for the couple's marriage and constituted the beginning of the Polish–Lithuanian union. The Union strengthened both nations in their shared opposition to the Teutonic Knights and the growing threat of the Grand Duchy of Moscow. Uniquely in Europe, the union connected two states geographically located on the opposite sides of the great civilizational divide between the Western or Latin, and the Eastern or Byzantine worlds.

The intention of the Union was to create a common state under Władysław II Jagiełło, but the Polish ruling oligarchy's idea of incorporation of Lithuania into Poland turned out to be unrealistic. There would be territorial disputes and warfare between Poland and Lithuania or Lithuanian factions; the Lithuanians at times had even found it expedient to conspire with the Teutonic Knights against the Poles. Geographic consequences of the dynastic union and the preferences of the Jagiellonian kings accelerated the process of reorientation of Polish territorial priorities to the east. The political influence of the Jagiellonian kings was diminishing during this period, which was accompanied by the ever-increasing role in central government and national affairs of landed nobility. (Note: This is true especially regarding legislative matters and legal framework. Despite the restrictions the nobility imposed on the monarchs, the Polish kings had never become figureheads. In practice they wielded considerable executive power, up to and including the last king, Stanisław August Poniatowski. Some were at times even accused of absolutist tendencies, and it may be for the lack of sufficiently strong personalities or favorable circumstances that none of the kings had succeeded in significant and lasting strengthening of the monarchy.) The royal dynasty, however, had a stabilizing effect on Poland's politics. The Jagiellonian Era is often regarded as a period of maximum political power, great prosperity, and in its later stage, the Golden Age of Polish culture.

==== Struggle with the Teutonic Knights ====
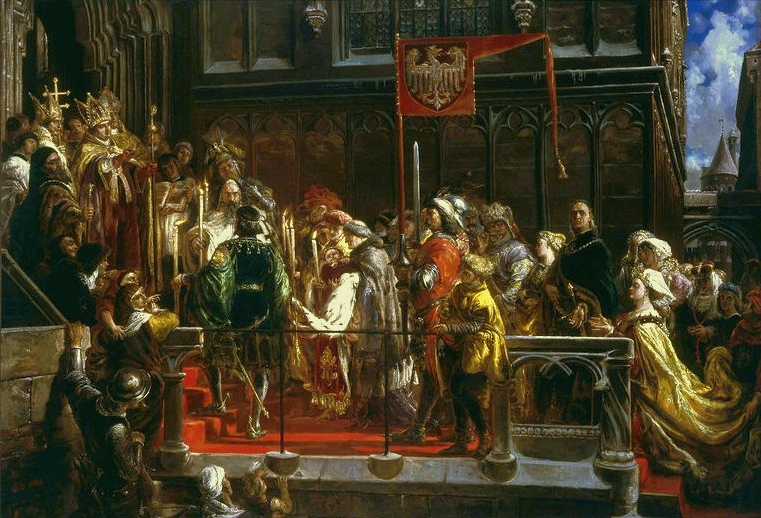
Baptism of Władysław III of Poland at Wawel in 1425

The Great War of 1409–1411, precipitated by the Lithuanian uprising in the Order controlled Samogitia, included the Battle of Grunwald (Tannenberg), where the Polish and Lithuanian armies completely defeated the Teutonic Knights. The offensive that followed lost its impact with the ineffective siege of Malbork (Marienburg). The failure to take the fortress and eliminate the Teutonic (later Prussian) state had for Poland dire historic consequences in the 18th, 19th and 20th centuries. The Peace of Thorn (1411) had given Poland and Lithuania rather modest territorial adjustments, including Samogitia. Afterwards there were negotiations and peace deals that didn't hold, more military campaigns and arbitrations. One attempted, unresolved arbitration took place at the Council of Constance.

==== Polish–Hungarian union ====
During the Hussite Wars (1420–1434), Jagiełło, Vytautas and Sigismund Korybut were involved in political and military maneuvering concerning the Czech crown, offered by the Hussites first to Jagiełło in 1420. Zbigniew Oleśnicki became known as the leading opponent of a union with the Hussite Czech state.

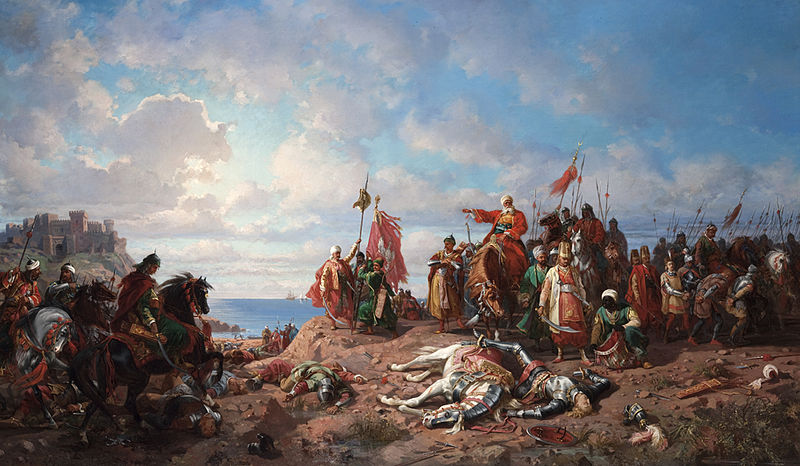
The Crusade of Varna was a series of events in 1443–44 between the crusaders and the Ottoman Empire, culminating in a devastating Christian loss at the Battle of Varna on 10 November 1444.

The Jagiellonian dynasty was not entitled to automatic hereditary succession, as each new king had to be approved by nobility consensus. Władysław Jagiełło had three sons (two of whom survived infancy) late in life from his last wife, Sophia of Halshany. In 1430 the nobility agreed to the succession of the future Władysław III, only after the King gave in and guaranteed the satisfaction of their new demands. In 1434 the old monarch died and his minor son Władysław was crowned; the Royal Council led by Bishop Oleśnicki undertook the regency duties. In 1438 the Czech anti-Habsburg opposition, mainly Hussite factions, offered the Czech crown to Jagiełło's younger son Casimir IV. The idea, accepted in Poland over Oleśnicki's objections, resulted in two unsuccessful Polish military expeditions to Bohemia.

After Vytautas' death in 1430 Lithuania became embroiled in internal wars and conflicts with Poland. Casimir IV, sent as a boy by Władysław III on a mission there in 1440, was surprisingly proclaimed by the Lithuanians as a Grand Duke of Lithuania, and he stayed in Lithuania.

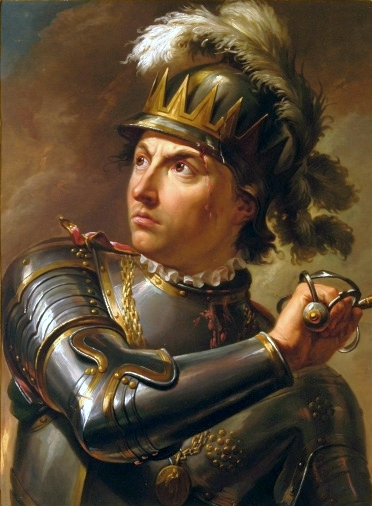
Władysław III during battle of Varna, where he disappeared.

Oleśnicki gained the upper hand again and pursued his long-term objective of Poland's union with Hungary. At that time the Ottoman Empire embarked on a new round of European conquests and threatened Hungary, which needed the powerful Polish–Lithuanian ally. In 1440 Władysław III assumed the Hungarian throne. Influenced by Julian Cesarini, the young king led the Hungarian army against the Ottomans in 1443 and again in 1444. During battle of Varna Władysław III disappeared and is presumed to be killed at the battlefield; he was eventually assumed to be deceased in Poland in 1445, when Polish throne was given to his only living brother, the Grand Duke of Lithuania Casimir, who was ultimately crowned two years later. Beginning toward the end of Jagiełło's life, Poland was practically governed by a magnate oligarchy led by Oleśnicki. The rule of the dignitaries was actively opposed by various szlachta groups. Their leader Spytek of Melsztyn was killed during an armed confrontation in 1439, which allowed Oleśnicki to purge Poland of the remaining Hussite sympathizers and pursue his other objectives without significant opposition.

=== Casimir IV Jagiellon ===
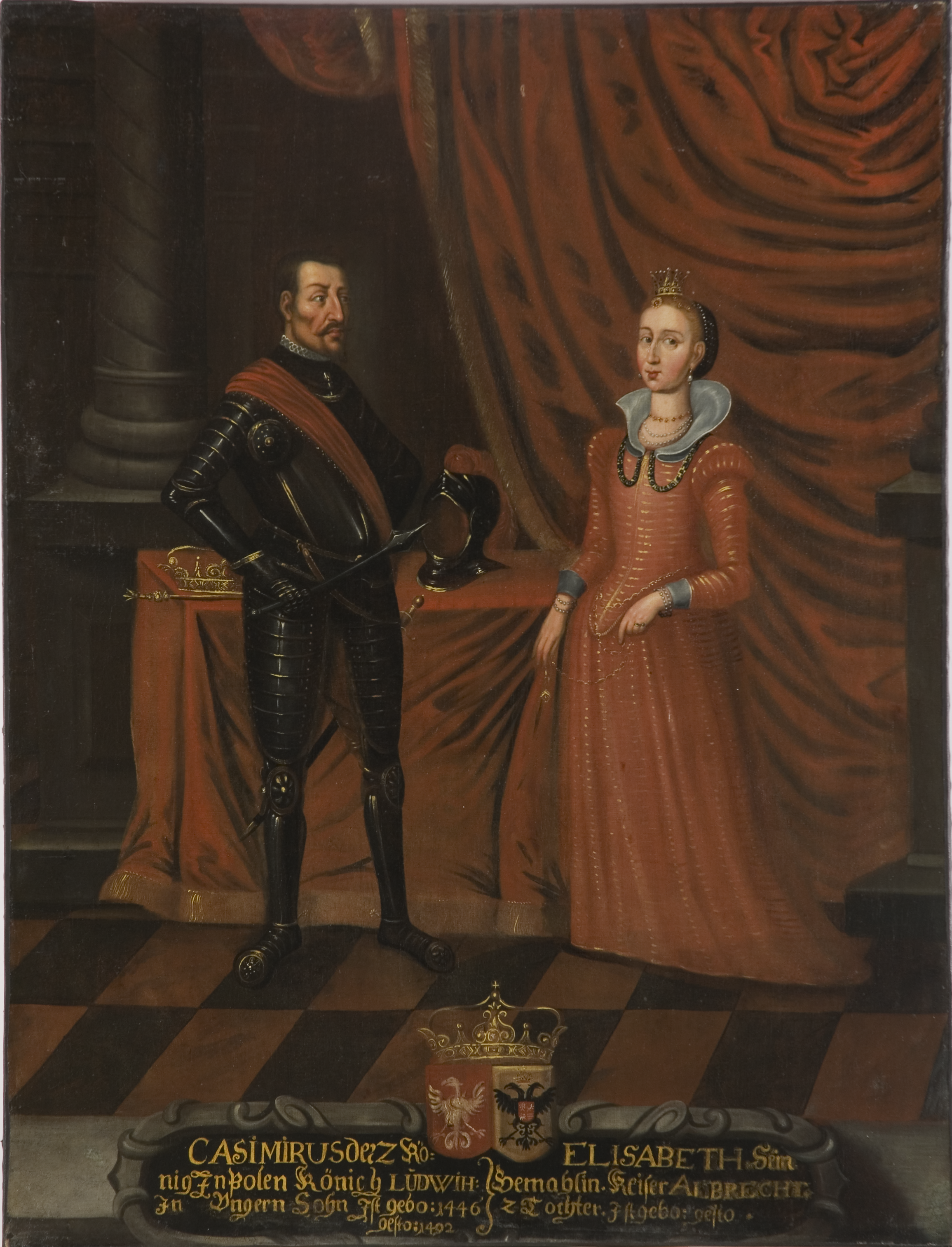
Casimir IV Jagiellon and his consort Elizabeth from Habsburgs, who gave birth to his 13 children

Casimir IV Jagiellon was the third and youngest son of King Władysław II Jagiełło and his fourth wife, Sophia of Halshany. His father was already 65 at the time of Casimir's birth, and his brother Władysław III, three years his senior, was expected to become king before his majority. Strangely, little was done for his education; he was never taught Latin, nor was he trained for the responsibilities of office, despite the fact he was the only brother of the rightful sovereign. He often relied on his instinct and feelings and had little political knowledge, but shared a great interest in the diplomacy and economic affairs of the country. Throughout Casimir's youth, Bishop Zbigniew Oleśnicki was his mentor and tutor; however, the cleric felt a strong reluctance towards him, believing that he would be an unsuccessful monarch following Władysław's death.

The sudden death of Sigismund Kęstutaitis left the office of the Grand Duchy of Lithuania empty. The Voivode of Trakai, Jonas Goštautas, and other magnates of Lithuania, supported Casimir IV Jagiellon as a candidate to the throne. However, many Polish noblemen hoped that the thirteen-year-old boy would become a Vice-regent for the Polish King in Lithuania. Casimir IV Jagiellon was invited by the Lithuanian magnates to Lithuania and was sent by his older brother Władysław III, King of Poland and Hungary, Supreme Duke of Lithuania, to Lithuania to rule in his name. But instead he was elected by the Lithuanian Council of Lords as the Grand Duke of Lithuania upon his arrival to Lithuania's capital Vilnius on 29 June 1440, with the ringing of church bells and the singing of the Te Deum laudamus. The Bishop of Vilnius put a Gediminas' Cap in the Vilnius Cathedral on Casimir IV Jagiellon's head, despite the Polish nobility's opposition. This was breaching the agreements of the Union of Grodno (1432) and terminating the Polish–Lithuanian union. It manifested Lithuania as a sovereign state and its ruler Casimir IV Jagiellon stressed himself as a "free lord" (pan – dominus). When the news arrived in Poland concerning the proclamation of Casimir IV Jagiellon as the Grand Duke of Lithuania, it was met with hostility, even to the point of military threats against Lithuania. Since the young Lithuanian Grand Duke was underage, the supreme control over the Grand Duchy of Lithuania was in the hands of the Lithuanian Council of Lords, presided by Jonas Goštautas, while Casimir IV Jagiellon was taught Lithuanian language and the customs of Lithuania by appointed court officials.

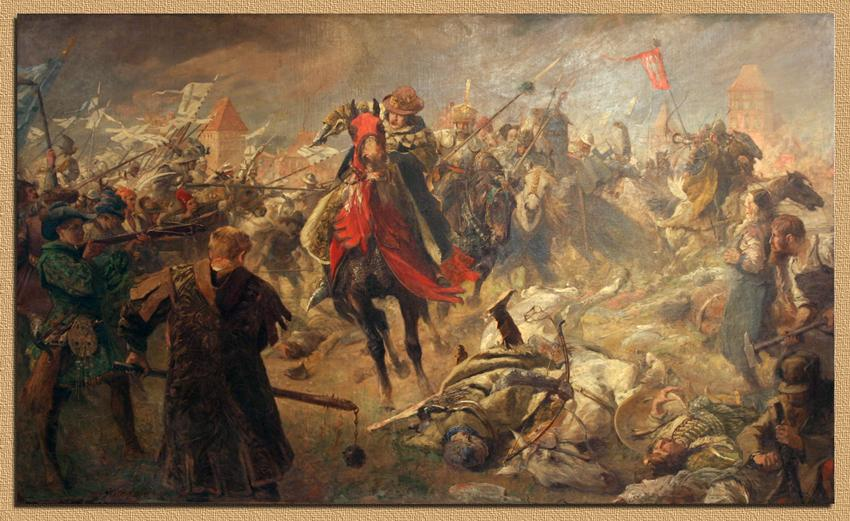
Thirteen Years' War – Battle of Chojnice in 1454

In 1445, Casimir IV Jagiellon, already being the Grand Duke of Lithuania, was asked to also assume the Polish throne vacated by the death of his brother Władysław III (killed at the Battle of Varna in 1444). Casimir IV Jagiellon was a tough negotiator and did not accept the Polish nobility's conditions for his election, thus he assumed the Polish throne only on a condition that Lithuania and Poland will be equivalent states. Casimir IV Jagiellon succeeded his brother Władysław III as King of Poland after a three-year interregnum on 25 June 1447. In 1454, Casimir IV Jagiellon married Elisabeth of Austria, daughter of the late King of the Romans Albert II of Habsburg by his late wife Elisabeth of Bohemia. Her distant relative Frederick of Austria became Holy Roman Emperor and reigned as Frederick III until after Casimir IV Jagiellon's own death. The marriage strengthened the ties between the house of Jagiellon and the sovereigns of Hungary-Bohemia and put Casimir IV Jagiellon at odds with the Holy Roman Emperor through internal Habsburg rivalry. Becoming a King of Poland Casimir IV Jagiellon also freed himself from the control the Lithuanian oligarchy had imposed on him; in the Vilnius Privilege of 1447 he declared the Lithuanian nobility having equal rights with Polish szlachta. In time Casimir IV Jagiellon was able to remove from power Cardinal Oleśnicki and his group, basing his own power on the younger middle nobility camp instead. A conflict with the pope and the local Church hierarchy over the right to fill vacant bishop positions Casimir IV Jagiellon also resolved in his favor.

==== Thirteen Years' War (1454–66) ====
That same year, Casimir IV Jagiellon was approached by the Prussian Confederation for aid against the Teutonic Order, which he promised, by making the separatist Prussian regions a protectorate of the Polish Kingdom. However, when the insurgent cities rebelled against the Order, it resisted and the Thirteen Years' War (1454–1466) ensued. Casimir IV Jagiellon and the Prussian Confederation defeated the Teutonic Order, taking over its capital at Marienburg (Malbork Castle). In the Second Peace of Thorn (1466), the Order recognized Polish sovereignty over the seceded western Prussian regions, Royal Prussia, and the Polish crown's overlordship over the remaining Teutonic Monastic State, transformed in 1525 into a duchy, Ducal Prussia. Poland regained Pomerelia and with it the all-important access to the Baltic Sea, as well as Warmia. In addition to land warfare, naval battles had taken place, where ships provided by the City of Danzig (Gdańsk) successfully fought Danish and Teutonic fleets.

Other 15th-century Polish territorial gains, or rather revindications, included the Duchy of Oświęcim and Duchy of Zator on Silesia's border with Lesser Poland, and there was notable progress regarding the incorporation of the Piast Masovian duchies into the Crown.

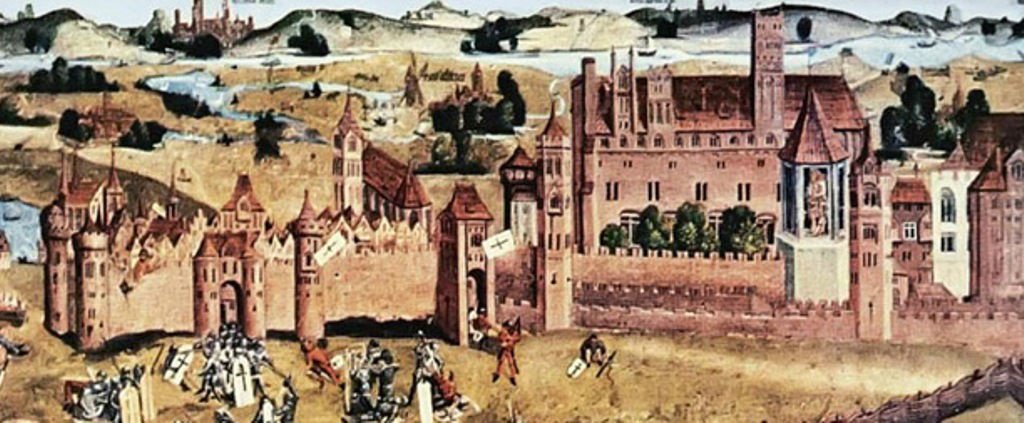
Malbork Castle during Thirteen Years' War (1460)

==== Turkish and Tatar wars ====
The influence of the Jagiellonian dynasty in Central Europe had been on the rise. In 1471 Casimir's son Vladislaus II became a king of Bohemia, and in 1490 also of Hungary. The southern and eastern outskirts of Poland and Lithuania became threatened by Turkish invasions beginning in the late 15th century. Moldavia's involvement with Poland goes back to 1387, when Peter I, Hospodar of Moldavia, seeking protection against the Hungarians, paid Jagiełło homage in Lviv, which gave Poland access to the Black Sea ports. In 1485 King Casimir undertook an expedition into Moldavia, after its seaports were overtaken by the Ottoman Turks. The Turkish controlled Crimean Tatars raided the eastern territories in 1482 and 1487, until they were confronted by King John Albert, Casimir's son and successor. Poland was attacked in 1487–1491 by remnants of the Golden Horde. They had invaded into Poland as far as Lublin before being beaten at Zaslavl. King John Albert in 1497 made an attempt to resolve the Turkish problem militarily, but his efforts were unsuccessful as he was unable to secure effective participation in the war by his brothers, King Władysław II of Bohemia and Hungary and Alexander, the Grand Duke of Lithuania, and because of the resistance on the part of Stephen the Great, the ruler of Moldavia. More Ottoman Empire-instigated destructive Tatar raids took place in 1498, 1499 and 1500. John Albert's diplomatic peace efforts that followed were finalized after the king's death in 1503, resulting in a territorial compromise and an unstable truce.

=== Sigismund I the Old and Sigismund II Augustus ===
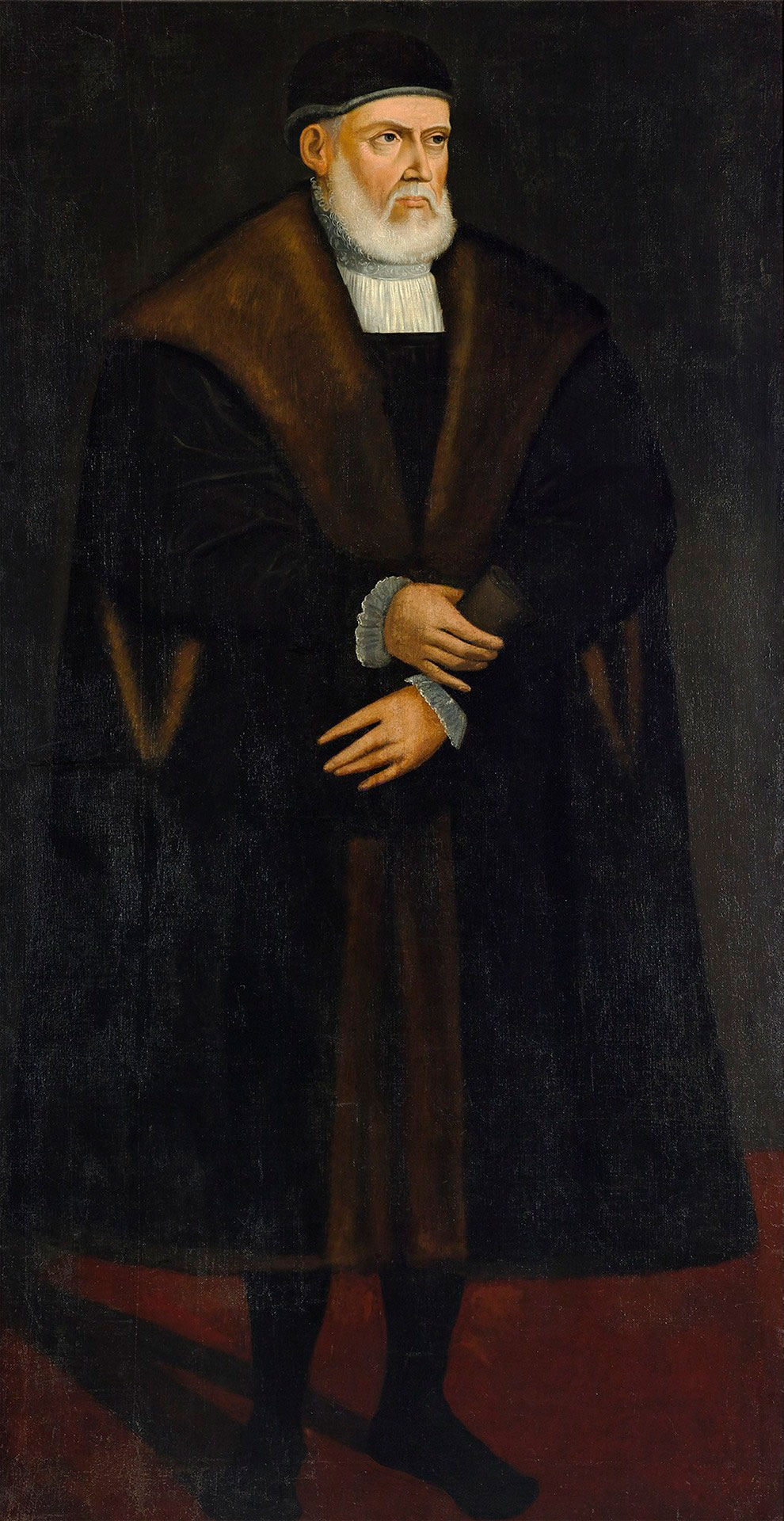
Sigismund I the Old (1467–1548), King of Poland and Grand Duke of Lithuania

The Grand Duke Alexander was elected King of Poland in 1501, after the death of John Albert. In 1506 he was succeeded by Sigismund I the Old (Polish: Zygmunt I Stary, Lithuanian: Žygimantas Senasis) in both Poland and Lithuania, as the political realities were drawing the two states closer together. Prior to that Sigismund I had been a Duke of Silesia by the authority of his brother Vladislaus II of Bohemia, but like other Jagiellon rulers before him, he had not pursued the Polish Crown's claim to Silesia.

After the death of King Alexander I, Sigismund I arrived in Vilnius, where he was elected by the Lithuanian Ducal Council on 13 September 1506 as Grand Duke of Lithuania, contrary to the Union of Mielnik, which involved a joint Polish–Lithuanian election of a monarch. On 8 December 1506 during the session of the Polish Senate in Piotrków, Sigismund I was elected King of Poland. He arrived in Kraków on 20 January 1507 and was crowned four days later in Wawel Cathedral by Primate Andrzej Boryszewski. In 1518 Sigismund I married Bona Sforza d'Aragona, a young, strong-minded Italian princess. The couple had six children together, including a male heir, Sigismund Augustus. In 1527, while pregnant with the sixth child, the Queen fell from a horse during hunting of a bear and gave birth prematurely to her second son, Prince Albertus, who died the same day; accident renderred Bona infertile and left Augustus as sole surviving legitimate son of the King.

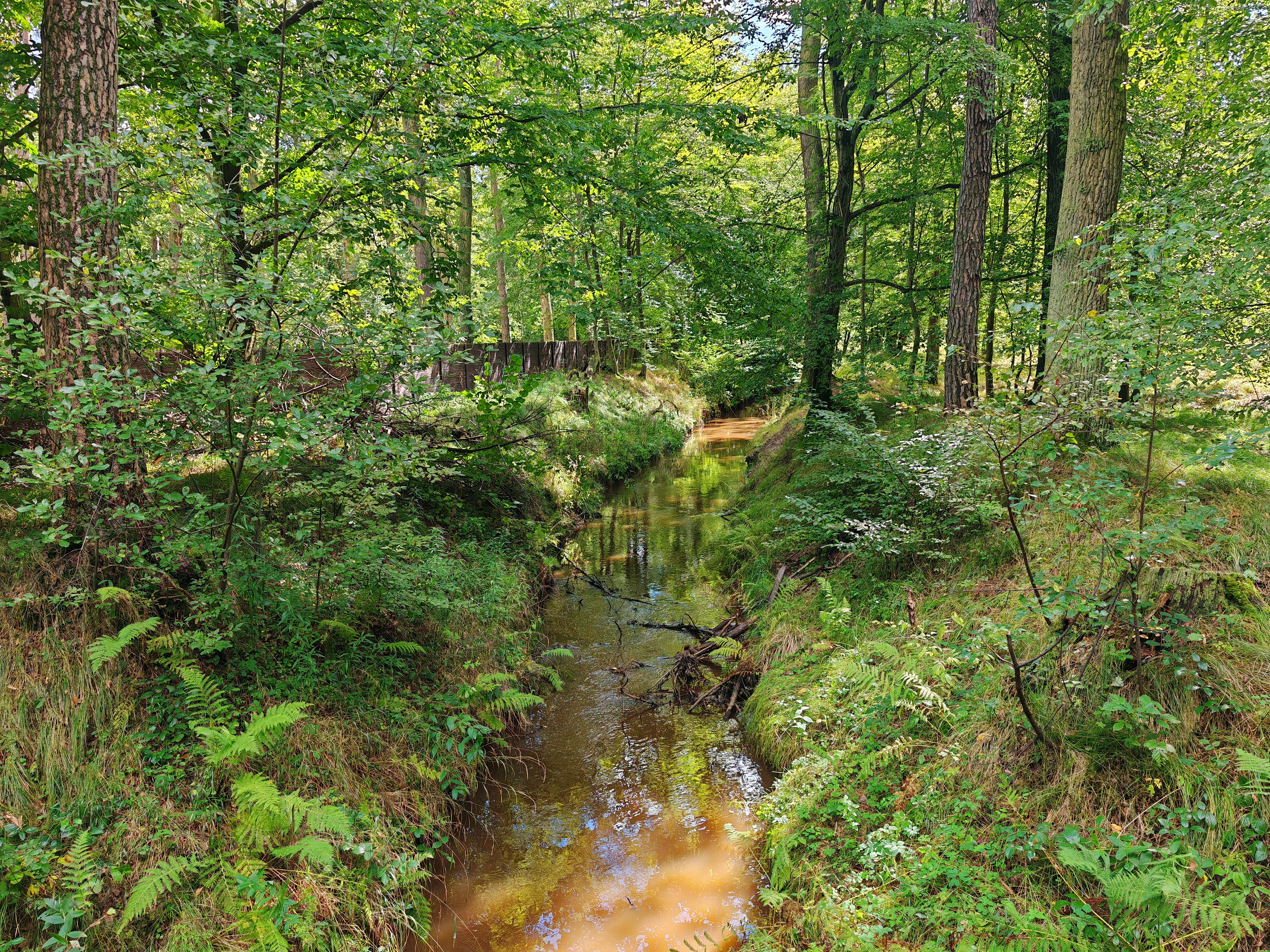
Niepołomice Forest, place of Bona's accident and Prince Albertus's birth, as well Sigismund II Augustus's and Barbara Radziwiłł's favourite hunting spot in Poland.

Bona's sway over the king and the magnates, her efforts to strengthen the monarch's political position, financial situation, and especially the measures she took to advance her personal and dynastic interests, including the forced royal election of the minor Sigismund Augustus in 1529 and his coronation in 1530, increased the discontent among szlachta activists.

==== Chicken War—the rebellion of Lwów ====
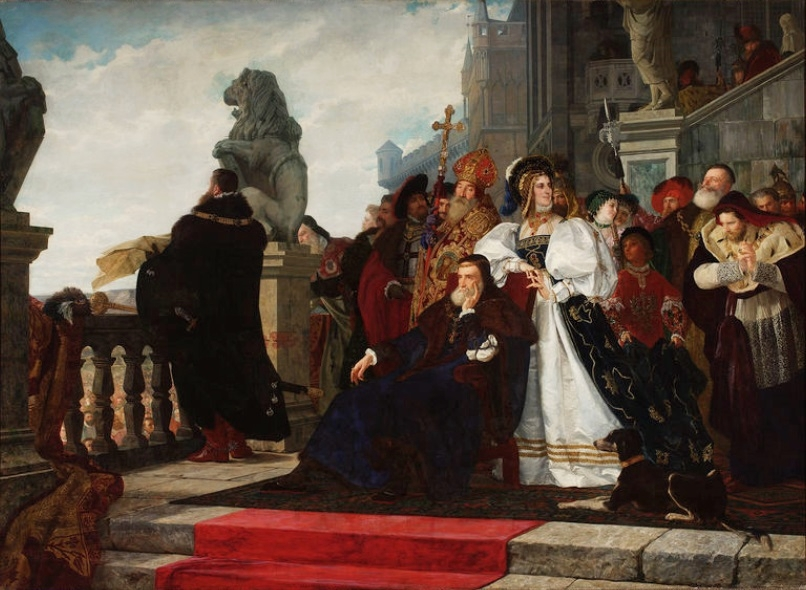
Chicken War or Hen War, a 1537 anti-royalist and anti-absolutist rokosz (rebellion) by the Polish nobility.

The rebellion of Lwów (the so-called Chicken War) was an anti-royalist and anti-absolutist rokosz (rebellion) by the Polish nobility that occurred in 1537. The derisive name was coined by the magnates, who for the most part supported the King and claimed that the "war's" only effect was the near-extinction of the local chickens, eaten by the nobles gathered for the rebellion at Lwów, in Lesser Poland. The nobility, gathered near the city to meet with a levée en masse, called for a military campaign against Moldavia. However, the lesser and middle strata of the nobility called a rebellion, or semi-legal rebellion, to force the King to abandon his risky reforms. The nobles presented him with 36 demands, most notably: a cessation of further land acquisitions by Queen Bona, exemption of the nobility from the tithes, a clean-up of the Treasury rather than its expansion, confirmation and extension of the privileges of the nobility, lifting of the toll or exemption of the nobility from it, adoption of a law concerning incompatibilitas—the incompatibility of certain offices that were not to be joined in the same hand, the carrying out of a law requiring the appointment of only the local nobles to most important local offices and the creation of a body of permanent advisors to the king. Finally, the protesters criticised the role of Queen Bona, whom they blamed for the "bad education" of young Prince Sigismund Augustus (the future King Sigismund II Augustus), as well as for seeking to increase her power and influence in the state.

==== Sigismund II Augustus ====
Following an agreement between Sigismund I, Bona Sforza and Lithuanian Council of Lords, Sigismund II Augustus was proclaimed as Grand Duke of Lithuania when he was 9 years old in Vilnius in 1529, which was soon followed by his election as King of Poland and coronation in the next year. Initially, Sigismund II opposed the Polish–Lithuanian union as he sought to leave the Lithuanian throne to his heirs as Jagiellonian patrimony. In 1544 he began to independently rule the Grand Duchy of Lithuania and moved his royal court from Kraków to Vilnius, which had a great influence on the intellectual life of the region. In 1548 Sigismund II finished the Renaissance style reconstruction of the Palace of the Grand Dukes of Lithuania in Vilnius which was started by his father, Sigismund I. The King maintained two separate and equally lavish Lithuanian-speaking and Polish-speaking royal courts in Vilnius.

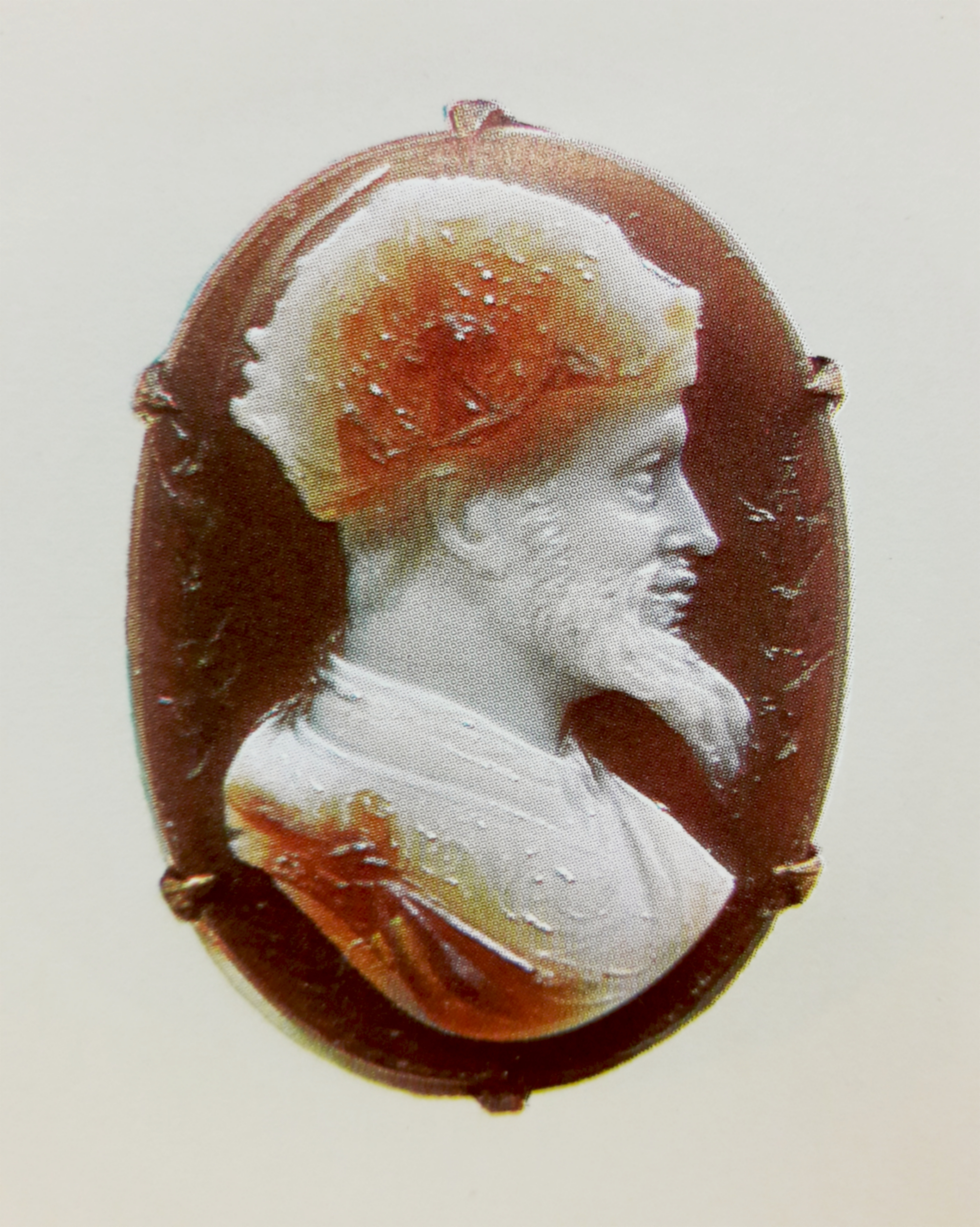
Sigismund II Augustus (1520–1572), King of Poland and Grand Duke of Lithuania. He ruled as co-monarch alongside his father in years 1529–1548 and as sole ruler since 1548.

From the outset of his reign, Sigismund II came into collision with the country's nobility, who had already begun curtailing the power of the great families. The ostensible cause of the nobility's animosity to the King was his second marriage with the Lithuanian noblewoman Barbara Radziwiłł, daughter of Hetman Jerzy Radziwiłł, conducted in secret during 1547 without consulting his parents and Polish nobility. Sigismund II publicly announced marriage and declared his wife the Queen of Poland in 1548. The King's marriage was strongly opposed by his mother Bona and by the magnates of the Crown, who demanded for marriage to be annulled or for Barbara to remained uncrowned (which would weaken position of potential children and would exclude them from being chosen as next rulers of Poland). Sigismund II, who became the sole king of Poland after his father's Sigismund I death in 1548, overcame the resistance and had Barbara crowned in 1550; a few months later the new queen died. Sigismund II accompanied the funeral procession of Barbara from Kraków to Vilnius by personally going on foot through cities. While Bona eventually accepted Barbara as the Queen, via representatives sent to her daughter-in-law in 1551, she remained estranged from her son and ultimately returned to Italy in 1556, where she died soon afterwards. During their stay in Kraków, Sigismund II and Barbara often resided in royal hunting residency in Niepołomice Castle; the King had continued renovation of complex that was started by his parents.

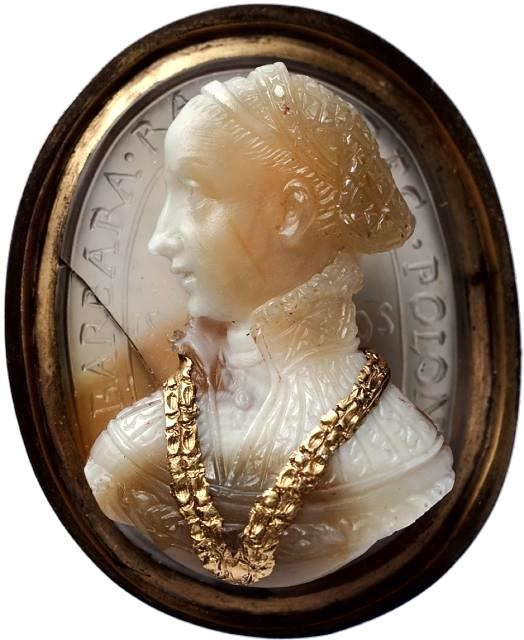
Barbara Radziwiłł (1523–1551), second wife of Sigismund II Augustus. She married King in 1547 and was declared Queen of Poland and Grand Duchess of Lithuania in 1548, but was crowned only in 1550, after three years of the royal couple's fight with opposition.

Sigismund II was noted by contemporaries for his persistence, patience, and diplomatic skill. Contemporary diplomatic correspondence, including reports by Austrian ambassadors and papal legates, described him as an effective political leader with a strong understanding of the workings of the Polish sejm. According to these accounts, he maintained considerable influence over parliamentary proceedings and was often perceived as anticipating political developments. During his reign, the sejm approved higher levels of taxation than under his predecessor. Contemporary sources also record that he sought to strengthen support among the nobility through symbolic gestures, including appearing before the sejm in the plain grey attire associated with the Masovian nobility. In foreign policy, Sigismund II generally continued the pro-Austrian orientation of his father while seeking to retain the support of the Polish nobility, and he avoided major military conflicts with the Ottoman Empire.

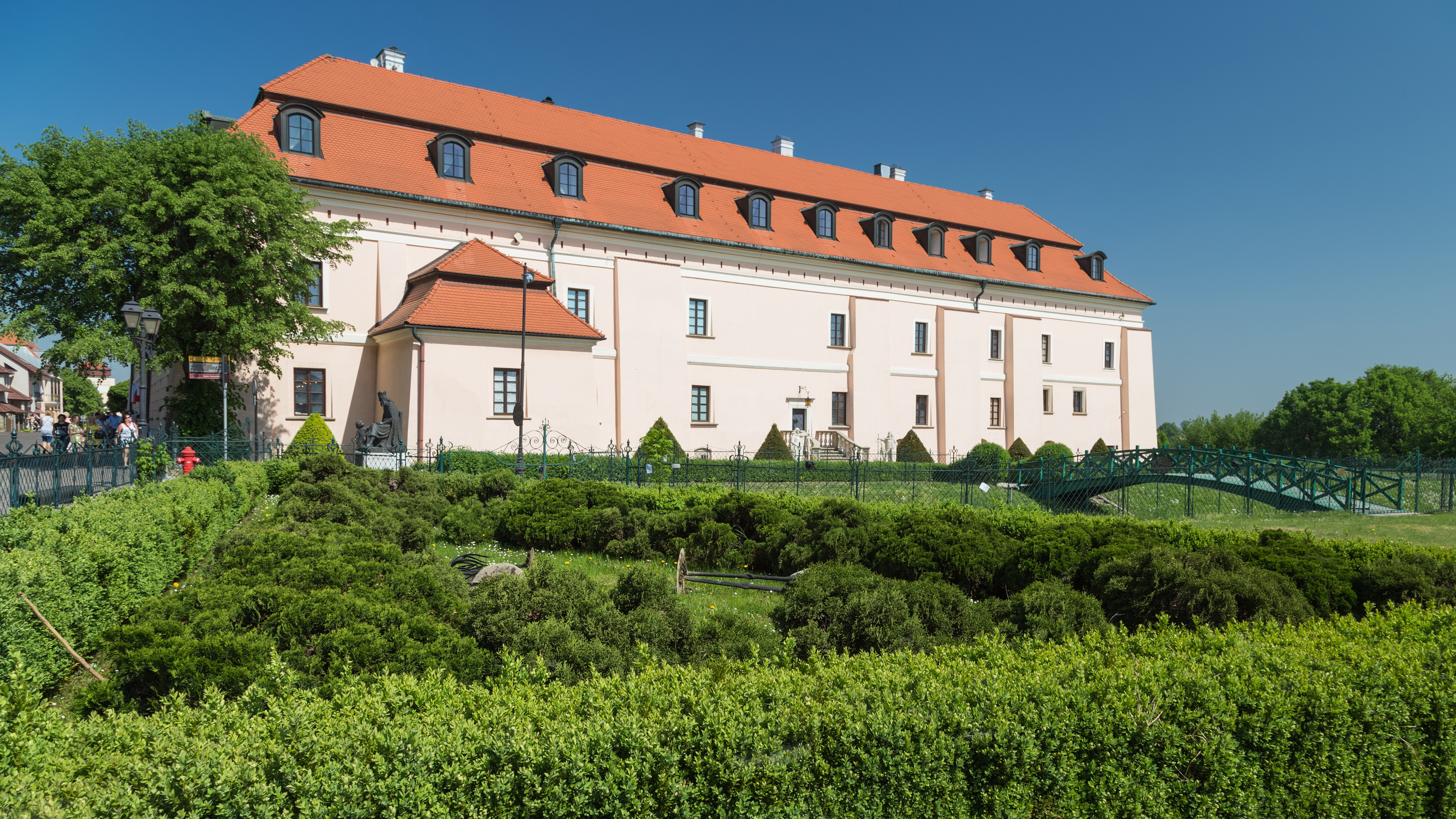
Niepołomice Castle, hunting residency of the last Jagiellons, renovated and expanded during reigns of Sigismund I the Old and Sigismund II Augustus.

Sigismund II mediated for twenty years between the Catholic Church and the Protestants. Unsuccessful and debilitating beginning of the Livonian War for the Grand Duchy of Lithuania and Lithuanian nobility's desire for equal rights with the Polish nobility resulted in childless Sigismund II's memorial—the Union of Lublin, which united Poland and Lithuania with equal rights into the Polish–Lithuanian Commonwealth—the "Republic of the Two Nations" (Polish: Rzeczpospolita Obojga Narodów, Lithuanian: Abiejų Tautų Respublika). Also, German-speaking Royal Prussia and Prussian cities were included. This achievement might well have been impossible without Sigismund II.

Sigismund II had no living children with any of his three wives, thus ending the male line of Jagiellonian dynasty, however descandants of the female line remained in control over Poland and Lithuania as elective monarchs until 1668.

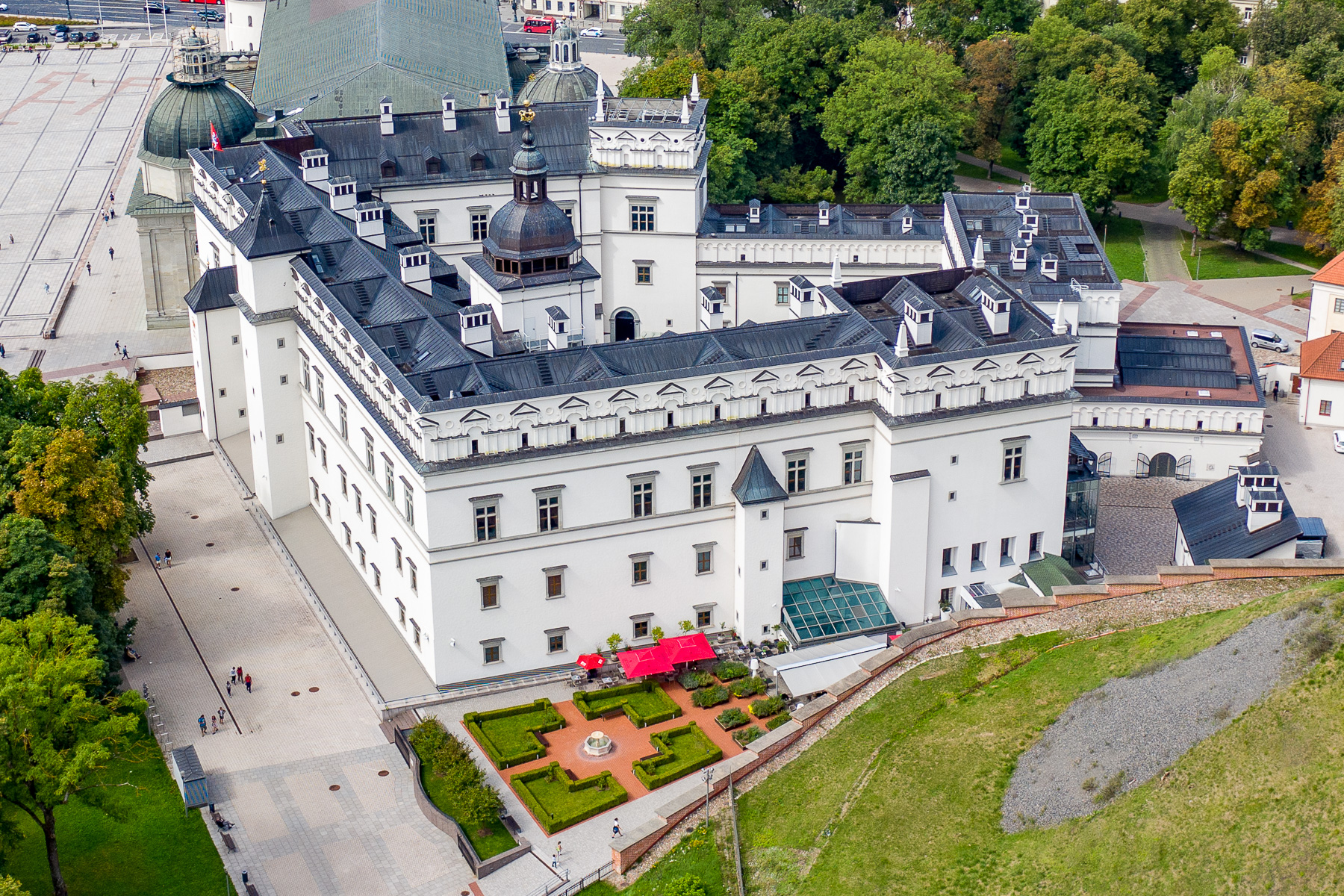
Palace of the Grand Dukes of Lithuania in Vilnius, the reconstruction of which in a Renaissance style was started by Sigismund I and was finished by Sigismund II Augustus

==== Golden Age of Polish culture ====
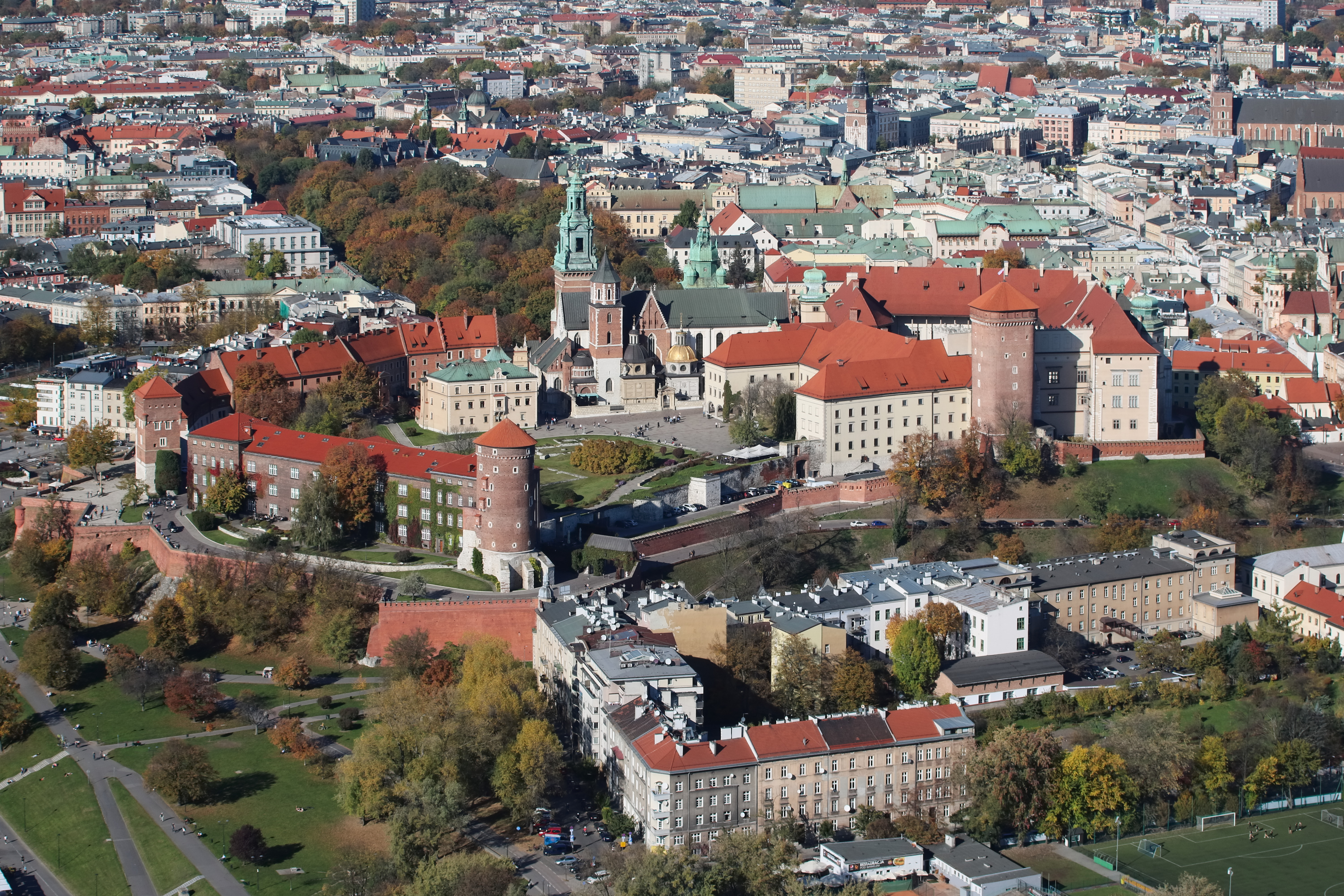
Wawel Hill, the castle and the cathedral

The Polish "Golden Age", the period of the reigns of Sigismund I and Sigismund II, the last two Jagiellonian kings, or more generally the 16th century, is most often identified with the rise of the culture of Polish Renaissance. The cultural flowering had its material base in the prosperity of the elites, both the landed nobility and urban patriciate at such centers as Kraków and Gdańsk. As was the case with other European nations, the Renaissance inspiration came in the first place from Italy, a process accelerated to some degree by the marriage of Sigismund I to Bona Sforza. Many Poles traveled to Italy to study and to learn its culture. As imitating Italian ways became very trendy (the royal courts of the two kings provided the leadership and example for everybody else), many Italian artists and thinkers were coming to Poland, some settling and working there for many years. While the pioneering Polish humanists, greatly influenced by Erasmus of Rotterdam, accomplished the preliminary assimilation of the antiquity culture, the generation that followed was able to put greater emphasis on the development of native elements, and because of its social diversity, advanced the process of national integration. The Academy of Kraków and Sigismund II possessed well-stocked libraries; smaller collections were increasingly common at noble courts, schools and the households of townspeople. Illiteracy levels were falling, as by the end of the 16th century almost every parish ran a school.

=== The Jagiellons and the Habsburgs ===
In 1515, during a congress in Vienna, a dynastic succession arrangement was agreed to between Maximilian I, Holy Roman Emperor and the Jagiellon brothers, Vladislaus II of Bohemia and Hungary and Sigismund I of Poland and Lithuania. It was supposed to end the Emperor's support for Poland's enemies, the Teutonic and Russian states, but after the election of Charles V, Maximilian's successor in 1519, the relations with Sigismund had worsened.

The Jagiellon rivalry with the House of Habsburg in central Europe was ultimately resolved to the Habsburgs' advantage. The decisive factor that damaged or weakened the monarchies of the last Jagiellons was the Ottoman Empire's Turkish expansion. Hungary's vulnerability greatly increased after Suleiman the Magnificent took the Belgrade fortress in 1521. To prevent Poland from extending military aid to Hungary, Suleiman had a Tatar-Turkish force raid southeastern Poland–Lithuania in 1524. The Hungarian army was defeated in 1526 at the Battle of Mohács, where the young Louis II Jagiellon, son of Vladislaus II, was killed. Subsequently, after a period of internal strife and external intervention, Hungary was partitioned between the Habsburgs and the Ottomans.

Sigismund II Augustus kept close diplomatic ties with the Habsburgs and took as his first and third wives daughters of Ferdinand I Habsburg, Elizabeth and Catherine, however both marriages remained unhappy and childless, what caused some tensions in relationship between King of Poland and family of his wives. Sigismund II remained allied to his former father-in-law also during marriage with Queen Barbara, as Ferdinand promised to Polish royal couple a military support in case of rebellion of nobles who were opposing king's choice of bride.

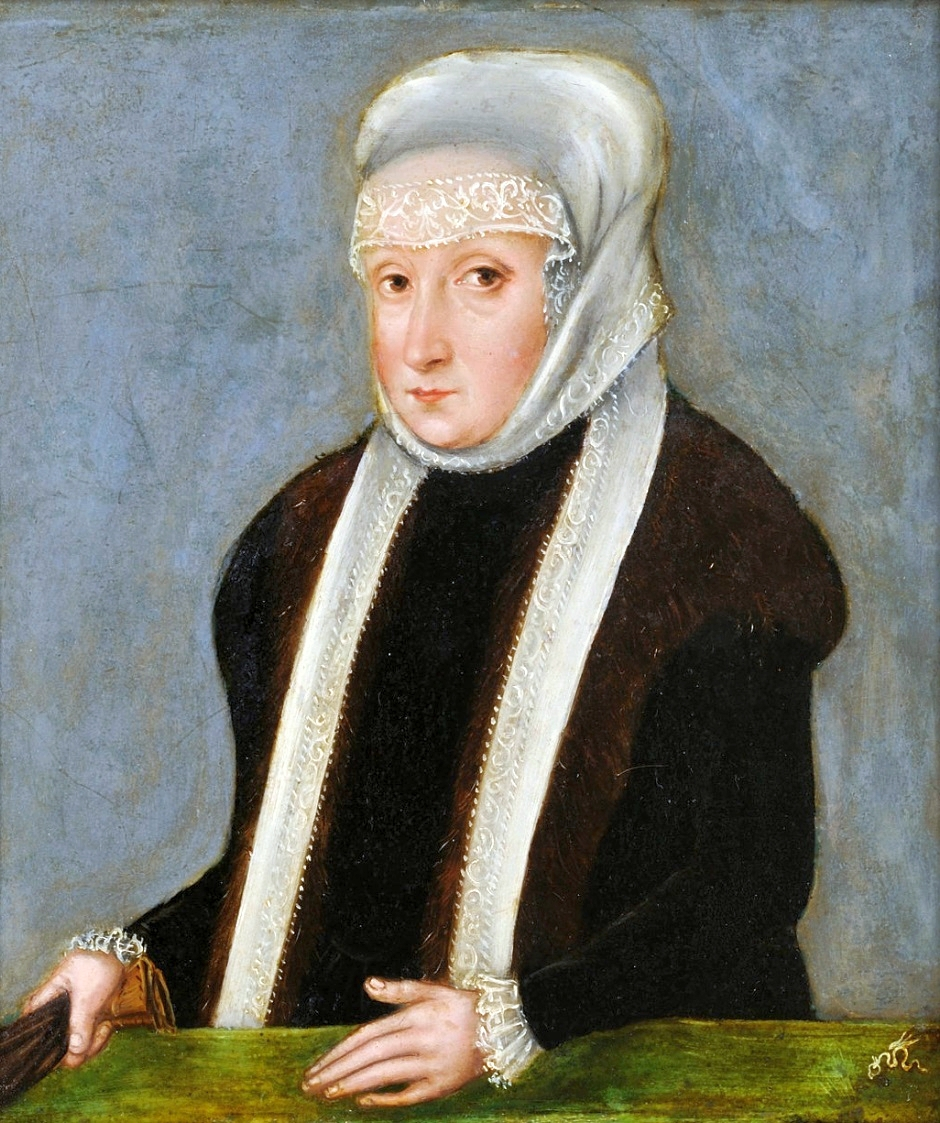
Isabella Jagiellon, wife of disputed king of Hungary John Zápolya, and mother of his heir John Sigismund Zápolya, for whom she served as regent.

On other hand, Sigismund I's daughter and Sigsmund Augustus's sister, Isabella Jagiellon, regent of Kingdom of Hungary in the name of her son John Sigismund Zápolya, was in diplomatic and military conflict with Ferdinand Habsburg, as both sides were laying claim to the Hungarian throne.

== Kingdoms of Bohemia and Hungary ==
=== Vladislaus II of Hungary ===
==== King of Bohemia ====
Vladislaus II Jagiellon (1456–1516), King of Bohemia and Hungary

Vladislaus II of Hungary was born on 1 March 1456, the oldest son of King Casimir IV of Poland and Grand Duke of Lithuania, then the head of the ruling Jagiellon dynasty of Poland, and Elizabeth of Austria, daughter of Albert, King of Germany, Hungary and Bohemia. He was christened as the namesake of his grandfather, King Władysław Jagiełło of Poland and Lithuania, his maternal uncle King Ladislaus the Posthumous of Bohemia and his paternal uncle Władysław III of Poland, an earlier king of Hungary.

He was proposed for the Bohemian throne by the widow of the previous king, George of Poděbrady, and was crowned King of Bohemia on 22 August 1471. The period after the death of George of Poděbrady was a time of conflict for the Bohemian throne (see Bohemian–Hungarian War (1468–1478)), and Vladislaus was unable to confront it. At the time of his arrival in Prague, he was only fifteen years old and significantly dominated by his advisers. The succession conflict was settled in 1479 in the Peace of Olomouc, which allowed both Vladislaus and Matthias Corvinus to use the title "King of Bohemia". Vladislaus would reign in Bohemia proper, while Matthias gained Moravia, Silesia, and the two Lusatias. The deal also stipulated that in case of Matthias' death, Vladislaus would pay 400,000 gulden for the entirety of the Bohemian lands. However, this payment was not made once Vladislaus became King of Hungary after the death of Matthias.

==== King of Hungary ====
Great chaos overcame Hungary when the King Matthias Corvinus died without heir in 1490. His illegitimate son John Corvinus was not recognized by the Hungarian nobility, and after being forced to retreat, they called Vladislaus to Hungary, as his mother was the sister of the long ago deceased King Władysław and granddaughter of King Sigismund. Vladislaus was then crowned King of Hungary on 18 September 1490.

Vladislaus immediately moved to Hungary, and there he lived the rest of his life, having his court and all his children born in the palace of Buda. The Hungarian nobility reigned and took many important decisions in his name, and his role as monarch soon passed to be in a second plan. Stephen Zápolya, the archbishop Tamás Bakócz and George Szatmári continued with the Turkish war plans and tried then to maintain the Kingdom that fell in a severe economical crisis after Matthias's death. Vladislaus was a cheerful man, but after the death of his third wife, he fell into a severe depression and almost retired from all official issues. Then he gained the nickname of "Vladislaus Bene" (Polish: Władysław Dobrze, Hungarian: Dobzse László, Czech: král Dobře) because to almost any request he answered, "Bene" (Latin for "(It is) well").

=== Louis II of Hungary ===
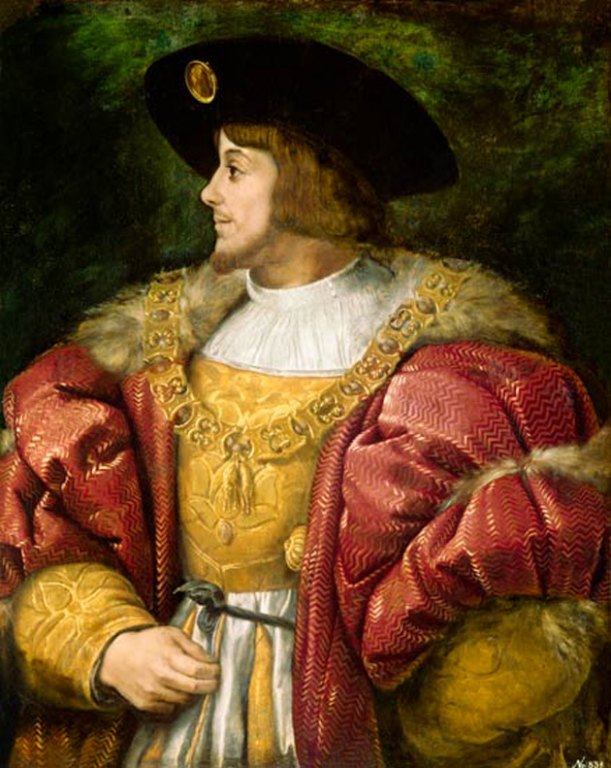
Louis II of Hungary (1506–1526), King of Hungary and Bohemia

Louis II was the son of Władysław II Jagiellon and his third wife, Anne of Foix-Candale. In 1515 Louis II was married to Mary of Austria, granddaughter of Emperor Maximilian I, as stipulated by the First Congress of Vienna in 1515. His sister Anne was married to Archduke Ferdinand of Austria, then a governor on behalf of his brother Charles V, and later Emperor Ferdinand I.

Following the accession to the throne of Suleiman I, the sultan sent an ambassador to Louis II to collect the annual tribute that Hungary had been subjected to. Louis refused to pay annual tribute and had the Ottoman ambassador executed and sent the head to the Sultan. Louis believed that the Papal States and other Christian States including Charles V, Holy Roman Emperor would help him. This event hastened the fall of Hungary. The Ottoman Empire declared war on the Kingdom of Hungary, Suleiman postponed his plan to besiege Rhodes and made an expedition to Belgrade. Louis failed to coordinate and gather his forces. At the same time, Hungary was unable to get assistance from other European states, which Louis had hoped for. Belgrade and many strategic castles in Serbia were captured by the Ottomans. This was disastrous for Louis' kingdom; without the strategically important cities of Belgrade and Šabac, Hungary, including Buda, was open to further Turkish conquests.

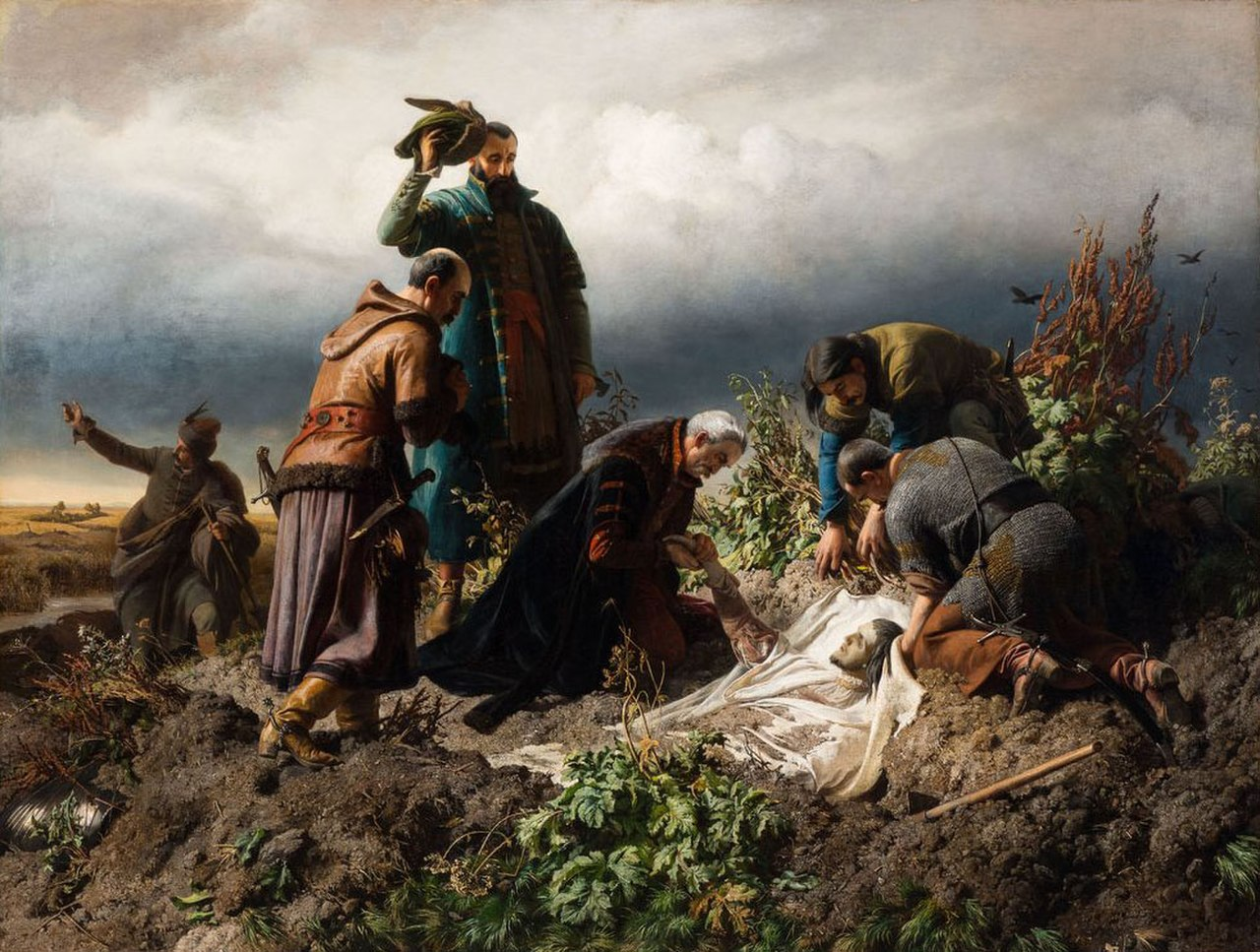
Discovery of the corpse of King Louis II after the Battle of Mohacs

After the siege of Rhodes, in 1526 Suleiman made a second expedition to subdue all of Hungary. Louis made a tactical error when he tried to stop the Ottoman army in an open field battle with a medieval army, insufficient firearms, and obsolete tactics. On 29 August 1526, Louis led his forces against Suleiman the Magnificent of the Ottoman Empire in the disastrous Battle of Mohács. In a pincer movement, the Hungarian army was surrounded by Ottoman cavalry, and in the center, the Hungarian heavy knights and infantry were repulsed and suffered heavy casualties, especially from the well-positioned Ottoman cannons and well-armed and trained Janissary musketeers.

Nearly the entire Hungarian Royal army was destroyed on the battlefield. During the retreat, the twenty-year-old king died in a marsh. As Louis had no legitimate children, Ferdinand was elected as his successor in the Kingdoms of Bohemia and Hungary, but the Hungarian throne was contested by John Zápolya, who ruled the areas of the kingdom conquered by the Turks as an Ottoman client.

== Jagiellonian Grand Dukes of Lithuania ==
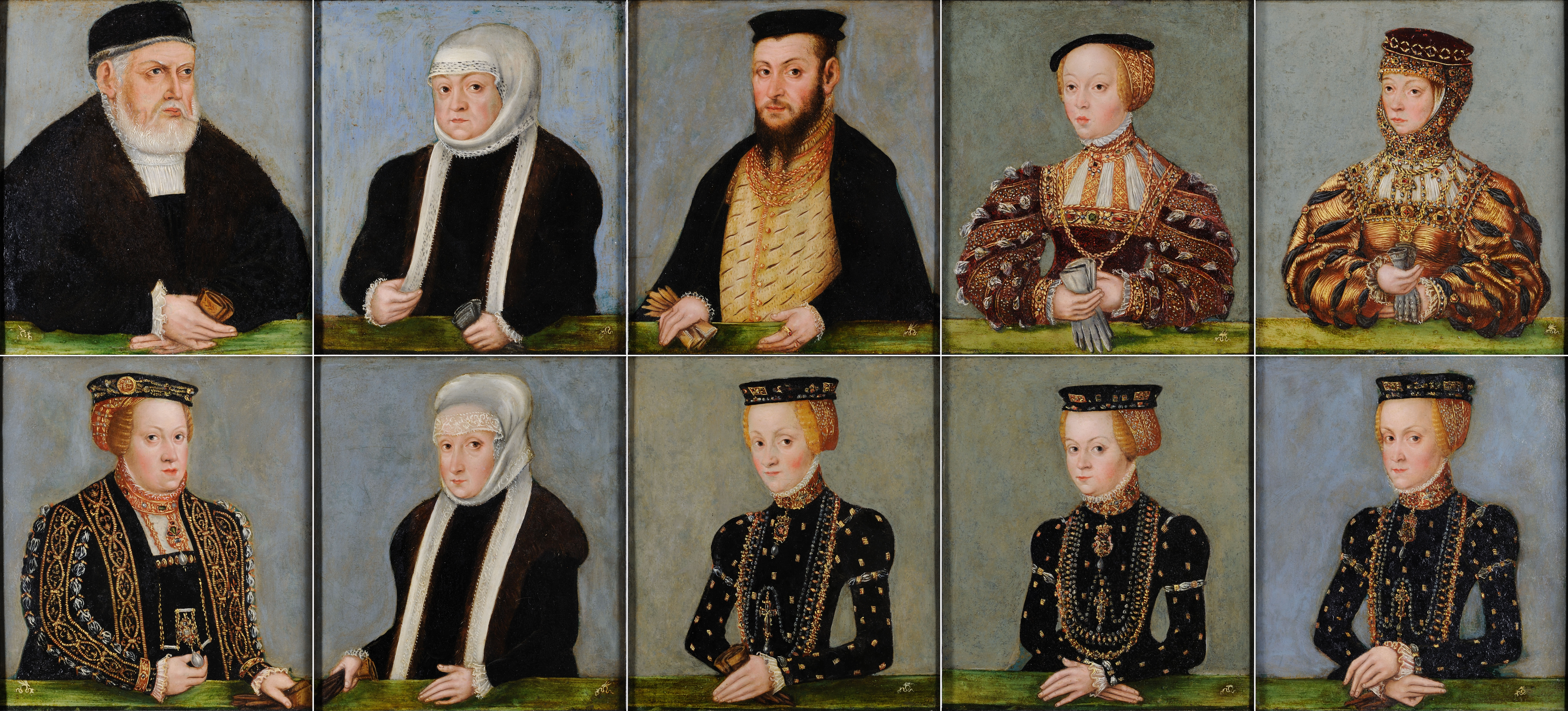
Jagiellon family

Portrait	Name	Born	Died	Reign	Spouse	Note
	Władysław II Jagiełło	ca. 1362	1434	1377–1381, 1382–1434	Jadwiga of Poland; Anne of Cilli; Elisabeth of Pilica; Sophia of Halshany	Founder of the Lithuanian Jagiellonian dynasty, derived from the Lithuanian dynasty of the Gediminids. His first title was Grand Duke of Lithuania since 1377, he became King of Poland only in 1386 after a Catholic baptism and marriage with the Polish Queen Jadwiga of Poland.
	Władysław III Jagiellon	1424	1444 (?)	1434–1444	none	Supreme Duke (Supremus Dux) of the Grand Duchy of Lithuania. He was the eldest son of Lithuanian Władysław II Jagiełło and his Lithuanian wife Sophia of Halshany.
	Casimir IV Jagiellon	1427	1492	1440–1492	Elisabeth of Austria	His first title was the Grand Duke of Lithuania since 1440, he became King of Poland only in 1447. He is the younger son of Władysław II Jagiełło and Sophia of Halshany.
	Alexander I Jagiellon	1461	1506	1492–1506	Helena of Moscow	His first title was the Grand Duke of Lithuania since 1492, he became King of Poland only in 1501.
	John I Albert (disputed)	1459	1501	1492–1501	none	Claimed the title of Supreme Duke as senior co-ruler over Alexander, but remained unrecognized by Lithuanian nobility.
	Sigismund I the Old	1467	1548	1506–1548	Barbara Zápolya; Bona Sforza	According to his 1506 privilege, which he granted during his coronation as the Grand Duke of Lithuania, he was elected not only as the grand duke, but also as the Supreme Duke (Supremus Dux) of the Grand Duchy of Lithuania.
	Sigismund II Augustus	1520	1572	1529–1572	Elisabeth of Austria; Barbara Radziwiłł; Catherine of Austria	Became Grand Duke of Lithuania and King of Poland in 1529, as co-ruler with his father. He married out of love a Lithuanian noblewoman Barbara Radziwiłł, which stirred conflict with nobles during first years of his reign.

The Jagiellonians were the primary inheritors of the title of the Grand Duke of Lithuania following the deaths of Vytautas the Great and Sigismund Kęstutaitis (children of Grand Duke Kęstutis) as they remained the most powerful branch of the Lithuanian Gediminids dynasty and were direct ancestors of Grand Duke Gediminas on male line.

== Jagiellonian Kings of Poland ==
Portrait	Name	Born	Died	Reign	Spouse
	Władysław II Jagiełło	ca. 1362	1434	1386–1434	Jadwiga of Poland; Anne of Cilli; Elisabeth of Pilica; Sophia of Halshany
	Władysław III of Poland	1424	1444 (?)	1434–1444	none
	Casimir IV Jagiellon	1427	1492	1447–1492	Elisabeth of Austria
	John I Albert	1459	1501	1492–1501	none
	Alexander I Jagiellon	1461	1506	1501–1506	Helena of Moscow
	Sigismund I the Old	1467	1548	1507–1548	Barbara Zápolya; Bona Sforza
	Sigismund II Augustus	1520	1572	1529–1572	Elisabeth of Austria; Barbara Radziwiłł; Catherine of Austria

After Sigismund II Augustus, the dynasty underwent further changes. Sigismund II's heirs were his sisters Anna Jagiellon and Catherine Jagiellon. The latter had married Duke John (a son of King Gustav I), who thereby from 1569 became King John III of Sweden, and they had a son, Sigismund III Vasa; as a result, the Polish branch of the Jagiellonians merged with the House of Vasa, which ruled Poland from 1587 until 1668. During the interval, among others, Stephen Báthory, the husband of the childless Anna, reigned.

== Jagiellonian Kings of Bohemia, Hungary and Croatia ==
Albert II of Germany died in October 1439, willing the Hungarian throne to his unborn son. The Hungarian nobles rejected the late king's testament and elected Władysław III as King of Hungary and Croatia on 8 March 1440. His reign lasted until his death in 1444, although his claim to the throne was contested throughout this period by Albert's son, Ladislaus the Posthumous.

Portrait	Name	Born	Died	Reign	Spouse
	Władysław III of Poland	1424	1444 (?)	1440–1444 Hungary and Croatia	none

At one point, the Jagiellonians established dynastic control also over the kingdoms of Bohemia and Hungary (from 1490 onwards), with Vladislaus Jagiello whom several history books call Vladisla(u)s II. After being elected and crowned King of Hungary, Vladislaus moved his court to Hungary from where he ruled both countries and his children were born and raised. By Louis' sudden death in Battle of Mohács in 1526, that royal line was extinguished in male line.

Portrait	Name	Born	Died	Reign	Spouse
	Vladislaus II of Bohemia and Hungary	1456	1516	1471–1516 Bohemia; 1490–1516 Hungary and Croatia	Barbara of Brandenburg; Beatrice of Naples; Anne of Foix-Candale
	Louis II of Hungary and Bohemia	1506	1526	1516–1526 Bohemia, Hungary, Croatia	Mary of Austria

== Other members of the Jagiellonian dynasty ==
Portrait	Name	Born	Died	Spouse	Offices and Titles
	Hedwig Jagiellon of Poland	1457	1502	George, Duke of Bavaria	Duchess of Bavaria-Landshut
	Saint Casimir	1458	1484	none	Saint of the Roman Catholic Church; Patron saint of the Polish–Lithuanian Commonwealth
	Sophia Jagiellon of Poland	1464	1512	Frederick I, Margrave of Brandenburg-Ansbach	Margravine of Brandenburg-Ansbach; Margravine of Brandenburg-Kulmbach
	Frederick Jagiellon	1468	1503	none	Archbishop of Gniezno; Bishop of Kraków; Primate of Poland
	Anna Jagiellon of Poland	1476	1503	Bogislaw X, Duke of Pomerania	Duchess consort of Pomerania
	Barbara Jagiellon of Poland	1478	1534	George, Duke of Saxony	Duchess consort of Saxony; Margravine consort of Meissen
	Anne of Bohemia and Hungary	1503	1547	Ferdinand I, Holy Roman Emperor	Queen consort of the Romans; Queen consort of Bohemia and Hungary
	Hedwig Jagiellon of Poland	1513	1573	Joachim II Hector, Elector of Brandenburg	Electress consort of Brandenburg
	Isabella Jagiellon of Poland	1519	1559	John Zápolya	Queen consort of Eastern Hungary
	Sophia Jagiellon of Poland	1522	1575	Henry V, Duke of Brunswick-Lüneburg	Duchess consort of Brunswick-Lüneburg; Brienne claim
	Anna Jagiellon of Poland	1523	1596	Stephen Báthory	Queen regnant ("female King") of Poland; Brienne claim
	Catherine Jagiellon of Poland	1526	1583	John III of Sweden	Duches consort of Finland Queen consort of Sweden

=== Jagiellons in natural line ===
==== Hungarian line ====
Although Louis II's marriage remained childless, he probably had an illegitimate child with his mother's former lady-in-waiting, Angelitha Wass, before his marriage. This son was called John (János in Hungarian). This name appears in sources in Vienna as either János Wass or János Lanthos. The former surname is his mother's maiden name. The latter surname may refer to his occupation. "Lanthos" means "lutenist", or "bard". He received incomes from the Royal Treasury regularly. He had further offspring.

==== Polish–Lithuanian line ====
Sigismund I the Old had three illegitimate children: John of the Lithuanian Dukes who became bishop of Catholic Church, Regina and Catherine, by his long-time mistress, Katarzyna Telniczanka; both daughters are known to have children of their own.

Sigismund II Augustus had one acknowledged illegtimate child, Barbara, born by his mistress Barbara Giżanka. The girl was adopted by her stepfather, kniaz Michał Woroniecki, and eventually married official of royal treasure, Jakub Zawadzki.

== Family tree of the House of Jagiellon ==
Family tree of the Jagiellonian dynasty

Vladislaus II (Jogaila) (Note: Kings are marked in gold, queens in pale gold.) c. 1363–1434; G. Duke of Lithuania, 1377–1401; King of Poland, 1386–1434
Elisabeth Bonifacia; 1399	Hedwig; 1408–1431	Vladislaus III; 1424–1444; King of Poland, 1434–1444; King of Hungary, 1440–1444	Casimir; 1426–1427	Casimir IV; 1427–1492; G. Duke of Lithuania, 1440–1492; King of Poland, 1447–1492
Vladislaus II; 1456–1516; King of Bohemia, 1471–1516; King of Hungary, 1490–1516	Hedwig; 1457–1502; Duchess of Bavaria-Landshut, 1475–1502	Saint Casimir; 1458–1484	John I Albert; 1459–1501; King of Poland, 1492–1501	Alexander; 1461–1506; G. Duke of Lithuania, 1492–1506; King of Poland, 1501–1506	Sophia; 1464–1512; Margravine of Brandenburg-Ansbach, 1479–1512	Elisabeth; 1465–1466	Sigismund I 1467–1548; King of Poland and G. Duke of Lithuania, 1506–1548	Frederick; 1468–1503; Bishop of Kraków, 1488–1503; Archbishop of Gniezno, 1493–1503	Elisabeth; 1472–after 1480	Anna; 1476–1503; Duchess of Pomerania, 1491–1503	Barbara; 1478–1534; Margravine of Meissen, 1494–1534	Elisabeth c. 1483–1517; Duchess of Liegnitz, 1515–1517
Anna; 1503–1547; Queen of Hungary and Bohemia, 1526–1547; Queen of the Romans, 1531–1547	Louis II; 1506–1526; King of Hungary and Bohemia, 1516–1526	Hedwig; 1513–1573; Electress of Brandenburg, 1535–1573	Anna; 1515–1520	Isabella; 1519–1559; Queen of Hungary, 1539–1540	Sigismund II Augustus; 1520–1571; King of Poland and G. Duke of Lithuania, 1529–1572	Sophia; 1522–1575; Duchess of Brunswick- Wolfenbüttel, 1556–1568	Anna; 1523–1596; Queen of Poland and G. Duchess of Lithuania, 1575–1586	Catherine; 1526–1583; Duchess of Finland, 1562–1583; Queen of Sweden, 1569–1583

Notes:

Bibliography:

- Kiaupa, Zigmantas. "Jogailaičiai" [Jagiellonians]. Visuotinė lietuvių enciklopedija (in Lithuanian).
- "Gediminaičiai" [Gediminids]. Visuotinė lietuvių enciklopedija (in Lithuanian).
- Gudas, Eimantas; Petrauskaitė, Živilė (2024). Gedimino kraujas [The Blood of Gediminas] (in Lithuanian). Vilnius: Alma littera. pp. 11–502. ISBN 9786090158999.
- Spečiūnas, Vytautas (2005). Gediminaičiai: enciklopedinis žinynas [The Gediminids: An Encyclopedic Reference Guide]. Vilnius: Mokslo ir enciklopedijų leidybos institutas. pp. 15–180. ISBN 9785420015582.

== Monarchs of Central and Eastern Europe ==
Monarchs of Central Europe: the House of Jagiellon and their competitors, 1377–1572

House of Jagiellon
Other Gediminids
Capetian House of Anjou
House of Luxembourg
House of Habsburg
Other

== Genetics ==
The Jagiellonian dynasty, a cadet branch founded by Władysław II Jagiełło, descends from the Gediminid dynasty in the male line. Y-DNA testing of living male-line descendants has shown that the Gediminid and Jagiellonian dynasties belong to haplogroup N-M231 (N1c1), within the L551 subclade. N-M231 originated in East Asia and spread westward to the South Baltic region.

== Legacy ==
- The Jagiellonian University in Kraków
- Jagiellonian Library of the Jagiellonian University in Kraków
- Globus Jagellonicus, is by some considered to be the oldest existing globe to show the Americas
- Jagiellonian tapestries is a collection of tapestries
- Jagiellonia Białystok, a football club, based in Białystok
- Jagiellonia Tuszyn, a former football club based in Tuszyn
- Jagiełło Oak, most noted of the Białowieża Forest oaks
- Jagiellonia, a fraternal society founded in 1910 in Vienna

== See also ==
- History of Poland during the Jagiellon dynasty
- List of Polish rulers
- List of Czech rulers
- List of Hungarian rulers
- List of Lithuanian rulers

== Bibliography ==
- Paul Srodecki, 'In Search of a Jagiellonian Europe. Internal and External Perceptions of the Dynasty and Its Legacy in East-Central and Eastern Europe'. In: Unions and Divisions. New Forms of Rule in Medieval and Renaissance Europe, ed. Paul Srodecki et al. (London und New York: Routledge, 2023), pp. 320–340. ISBN 978-1-032-05752-1
- Małgorzata Duczmal, Jagiellonowie: Leksykon biograficzny, Kraków 1996.
- Stanisław Grzybowski, Dzieje Polski i Litwy (1506–1648), Kraków 2000. ISBN 83-85719-48-2
- Paweł Jasienica, Polska Jagiellonów (1963), ISBN 978-83-7469-522-0
- Wojciech Dominiak, Bożena Czwojdrak, Beata Jankowiak-Konik, Jagiellonowie
- Marek Derwich, Monarchia Jagiellonów (1399–1586)
- Krzysztof Baczkowski, Polska i jej sąsiedzi za Jagiellonów
- Henryk Litwin, "Central European Superpower", BUM Magazine, October 2016.
