= Kardosné =

Kardosné (16th century) was the mistress of Hungarian king John Zápolya. She lived in Debrecen and she had no children with Szapolyai.

== Sources ==
Preceded by Angelitha Wass	Royal mistress of Hungary	Succeeded by Katharina Strada
