= Louis of Hungary =

Louis of Hungary may refer to:

- Louis I of Hungary (king 1342–1382)
- Louis II of Hungary (king 1516–1526)
