= Was =

Was most often refers to:

- Was, a past-tense form of the English copular verb to be

Was or WAS may also refer to:

== People ==
- David Was (born c. 1952), the stage name of multi-instrumentalist and songwriter David Weiss
- Don Was (born 1952), the stage name of bass guitarist, record producer, and recording executive Donald Fagenson
- W. A. Sibly (1882–1959), headmaster and vegetarianism activist, who was also known by his initials W. A. S.

== In arts and entertainment ==
- Was (novel), by Geoff Ryman, 1992
- "Was", a short story in William Faulkner's Go Down, Moses
- Was??, a musical composition by Folke Rabe
- Was (Not Was), an American pop group led by David and Don Was

== Software ==
- IBM WebSphere Application Server
- Windows Activation Services, a container for hosting WCF services

== In reference to Washington, D.C. ==
- All airports serving the Washington, D.C. area (IATA airport code)
- Washington Union Station (Amtrak station code)
- The city's major professional sports teams:
  - Washington Commanders of the National Football League
  - Washington Wizards of the National Basketball Association
  - Washington Capitals of the National Hockey League
  - Washington Nationals of Major League Baseball

== Other uses ==
- Was-sceptre, an Egyptian symbol
- Was (horse)
- We Are Singaporeans, a game show
- Wearne's Air Service, an early Malayan airline
- Welsh Ambulance Service
- Wiskott–Aldrich syndrome, an X-linked recessive disease
- World Association for Sexual Health

== See also ==
- Wass (disambiguation)
- WA (disambiguation)
