= WASS =

WASS may refer to:

- WASS or Whitehead Alenia Sistemi Subacquei, an Italian defense company
- WASS, the ICAO code for Dominique Edward Osok Airport, in Indonesia

== See also ==
- Wass (disambiguation)
