= First Congress of Vienna =

1515 conference of European monarchs

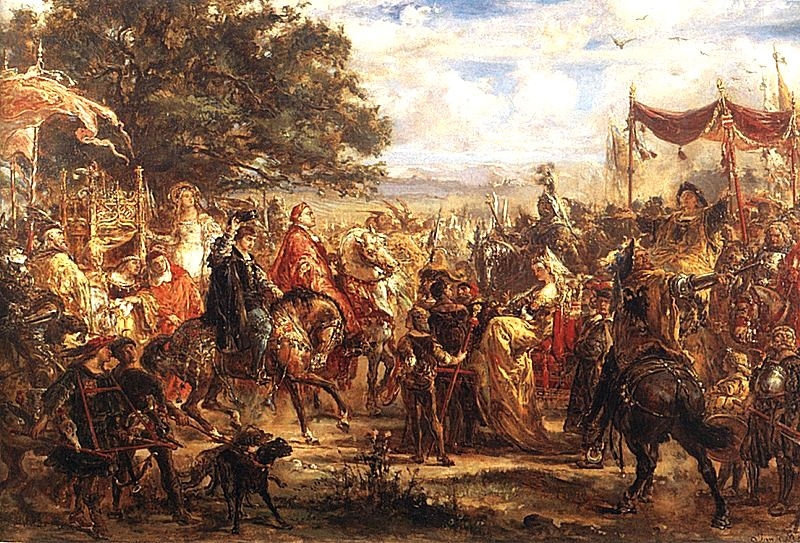
Meeting of the Holy Roman Emperor, Maximilian I, and the Jagiellonian brothers, Vladislaus II, King of Hungary and King of Bohemia, and Sigismund I, King of Poland and Grand Duke of Lithuania, by Jan Matejko (1838-1893)

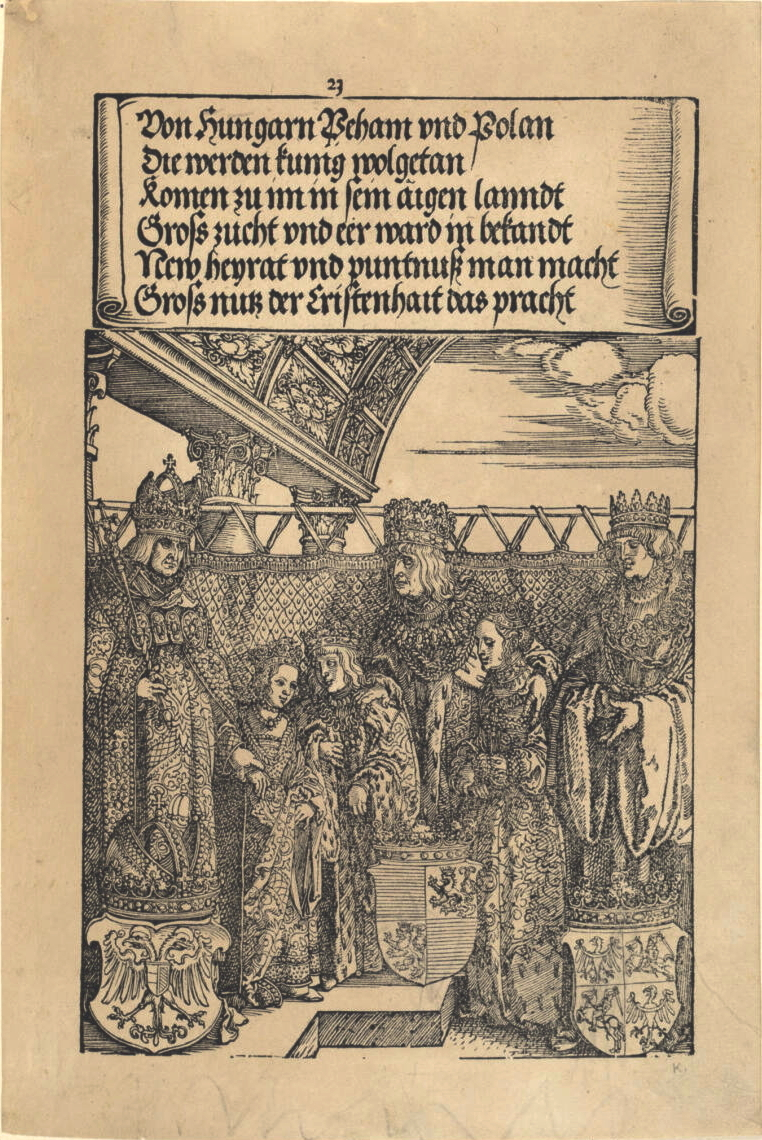
Woodcut by Albrecht Dürer from the Triumphal Arch commemorating the double wedding at the First Congress of Vienna, on 22 July 1515. Anna's betrothed Ferdinand I (age 11) is not shown. From left to right: Maximilian I; Maximilian's granddaughter, Mary (age 9) marrying Vladislaus's son Louis (age 9); Vladislaus II; Vladislaus's daughter, Anna (age 12); and Vladislaus's brother, Sigismund I.

The First Congress of Vienna was held in 1515, attended by the Holy Roman Emperor, Maximilian I, and the Jagiellonian brothers, Vladislaus II, King of Hungary and King of Bohemia, and Sigismund I, King of Poland and Grand Duke of Lithuania. Previously, Vladislaus and Maximilian had agreed on a Habsburg-Jagiellon mutual-succession treaty in 1506. It became a turning point in the history of Central Europe. After the death of Vladislaus, and later his son and heir, the childless King Louis II at the Battle of Mohács against the Ottomans in 1526, the Habsburg-Jagellion mutual succession treaty ultimately increased the power of the Habsburgs and diminished that of the Jagiellonians.

Maximilian had been supporting Vasili III of the Grand Duchy of Moscow against the Jagiellonian rulers of Lithuania, Poland, Hungary and Bohemia, to advance the Habsburg claims to the succession in Hungary and Bohemia. The Jagiellonians had been facing simultaneous threats on all fronts, from the Emperor, the Muscovites, the Teutonic Order under Albert of Prussia, and the Crimean Tatars. The city of Smolensk fell to the Muscovites in 1514, and Maximilian planned a congress to cement his claims in central Europe. However, Lithuanian and Polish forces decisively defeated the Moscow army at the Battle of Orsha on 8 September 1514, changing the balance of power.

The Congress opened at the Emperor's border, at Bratislava (Pressburg or Pozsony) in Hungary, where Maximilian's representative met Vladislaus and Sigismund, and concluded after they travelled together to Austria where the two kings met the emperor and went on to Vienna. The Emperor promised to cease his support of Moscow against Lithuania and Poland, and to arbitrate in disputes between the Teutonic Order and Poland under the Second Treaty of Thorn. Maximilan and Vladislaus decided in the congress: their mutual succession treaty was further confirmed by a double wedding. Accordingly, Vladislaus's only son, Louis, married the Emperor's granddaughter Mary; and Emperor's grandson, Archduke Ferdinand, married Vladislaus' daughter, Anna. The Habsburg claims to the succession in Hungary and Bohemia were advanced substantially by the marriages. A woodcut by Albrecht Dürer commemorates the double wedding on 22 July 1515.

Vladislaus died on 13 March 1516, and Maximilian died on 12 January 1519, but his designs were ultimately successful: on Louis's death in 1526, he was succeeded as King of Bohemia by Maximilian's grandson, Ferdinand I, Holy Roman Emperor.
