= Louis II of Hungary =

King of Hungary and Croatia from 1516 to 1526

Louis II
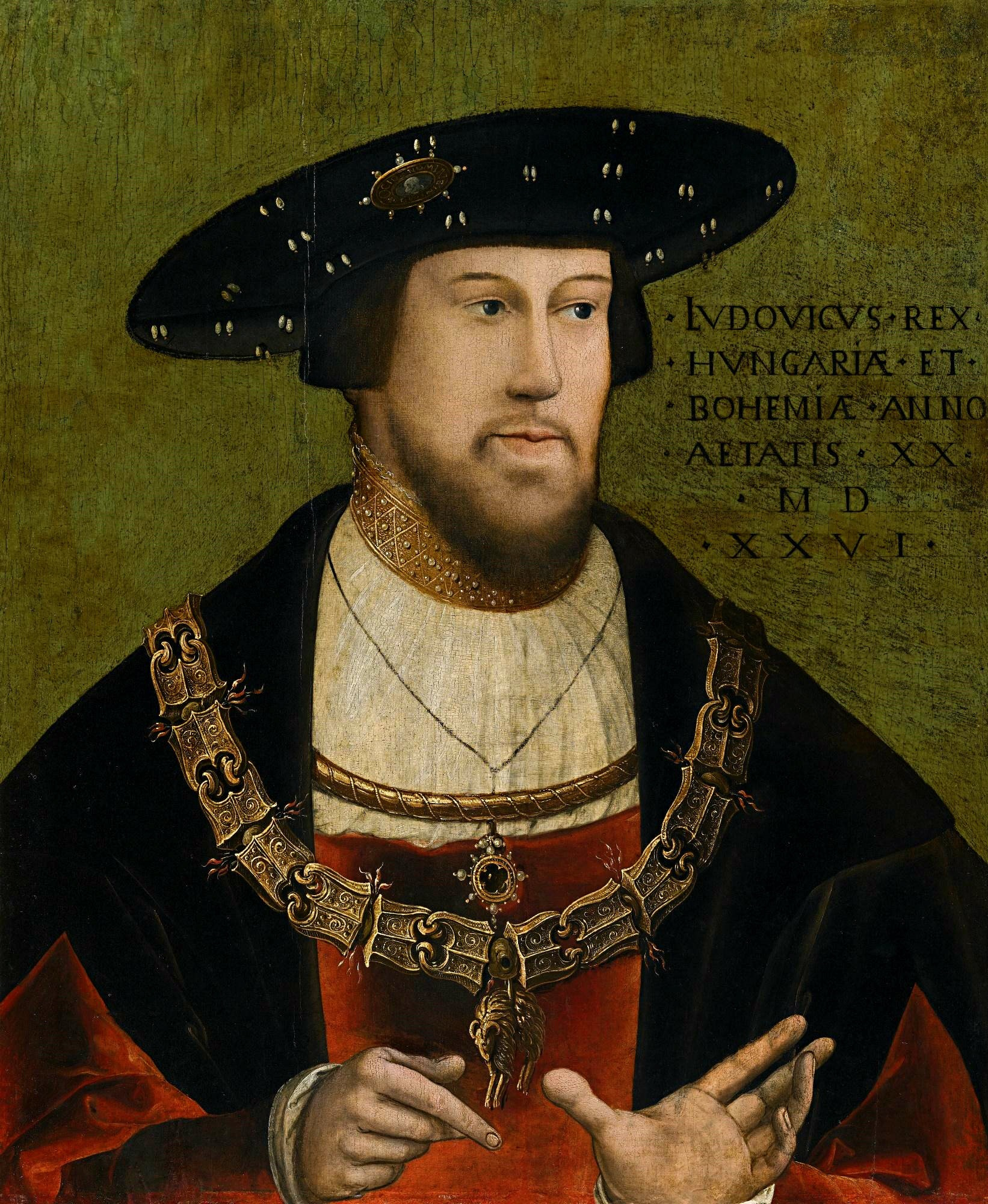
- Portrait by Hans Krell, 1526

King of Hungary and Croatia
- Reign: 13 March 1516 – 29 August 1526
- Coronation: 4 June 1508
- Predecessor: Vladislaus II
- Successor: Ferdinand I John Zápolya

King of Bohemia
- Reign: 13 March 1516 – 29 August 1526
- Coronation: 11 March 1509
- Predecessor: Vladislaus II
- Successor: Ferdinand I
- Born: 1 July 1506; Buda, Kingdom of Hungary (now Budapest, Hungary)
- Died: 29 August 1526 (aged 20); Mohács, Kingdom of Hungary
- Burial: Székesfehérvár Cathedral
- Spouse: Mary of Austria (m. 1515)
- Issue: Janos Wass (illegitimate)
- House: Jagiellon
- Father: Vladislaus II
- Mother: Anne of Foix
- Religion: Catholic Church

Louis II (Hungarian: II. Lajos; Czech: Ludvík Jagellonský; Croatian: Ludovik II.; Slovak: Ľudovít II.; 1 July 1506 – 29 August 1526) was King of Hungary, Croatia and Bohemia from 1516 to 1526. He died during the Battle of Mohács fighting the Ottomans, whose victory led to the Ottoman annexation of large parts of Hungary.

== Early life ==
At his premature birth in Buda on 1 July 1506, the court doctors kept him alive by slaying animals and wrapping him in their warm carcasses as a primitive incubator. He was the only son of Vladislaus II Jagiellon and his third wife, Anne of Foix.

== Coronation ==
Vladislaus II took steps to ensure a smooth succession by arranging for the boy to be crowned in his own lifetime; the coronation of Louis as king of Hungary took place on 4 June 1508 in Székesfehérvár Basilica, and his coronation as king of Bohemia was held on 11 March 1509 in St. Vitus Cathedral in Prague.

=== King of Hungary and Croatia ===
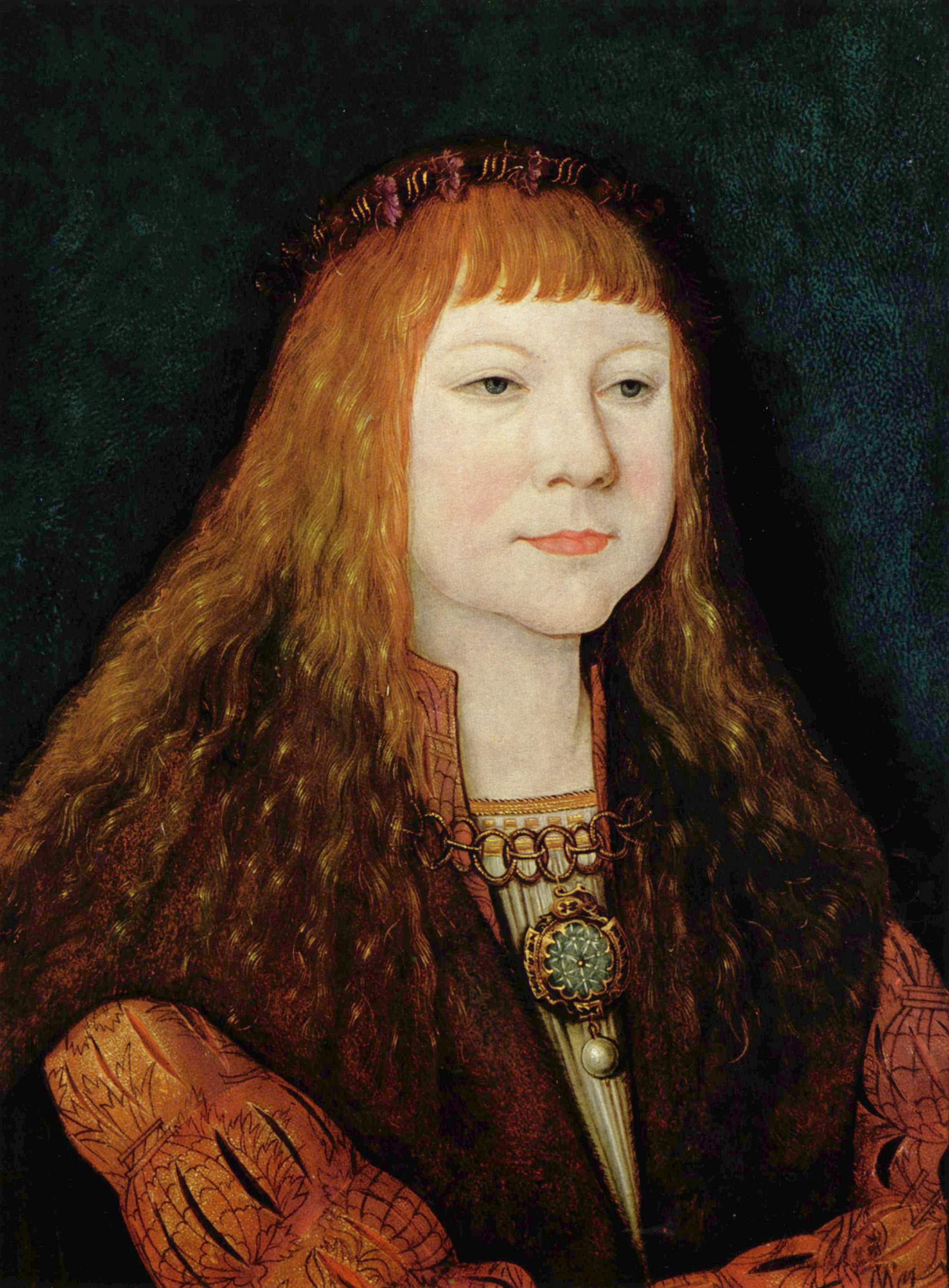
Young Louis II, about 1515, by Bernhard Strigel

In 1515 Louis II was married to Mary of Austria, granddaughter of Emperor Maximilian I, as stipulated by the First Congress of Vienna in 1515. His sister Anne was married to Mary's brother Ferdinand, then a governor on behalf of his brother Charles V, and later Emperor Ferdinand I.

During the greater part of his reign he was the puppet of the magnates and kept in such penury that he was often obliged to pawn his jewels to get enough food and clothing. His guardians, Cardinal Tamás Bakócz and Count George Brandenburg-Ansbach, shamefully neglected him, squandered the royal revenues and distracted the whole kingdom with their endless dissensions. Matters grew even worse on the death of Cardinal Bakócz, when the magnates István Báthory, John Zápolya and István Werbőczy fought each other furiously, and used the diets as their tools.

=== King of Bohemia ===
As king of Bohemia, Louis became known as "Ludovicus the Child". The first thaler coins were minted during his reign in Bohemia, later giving the name to the dollars used in different countries. These correctly style him as "LVDOVICVS•PRIM•D:GRACIA•REX•BO*" (Louis the First, by the grace of God King of Bohemia).

== War with the Ottomans ==
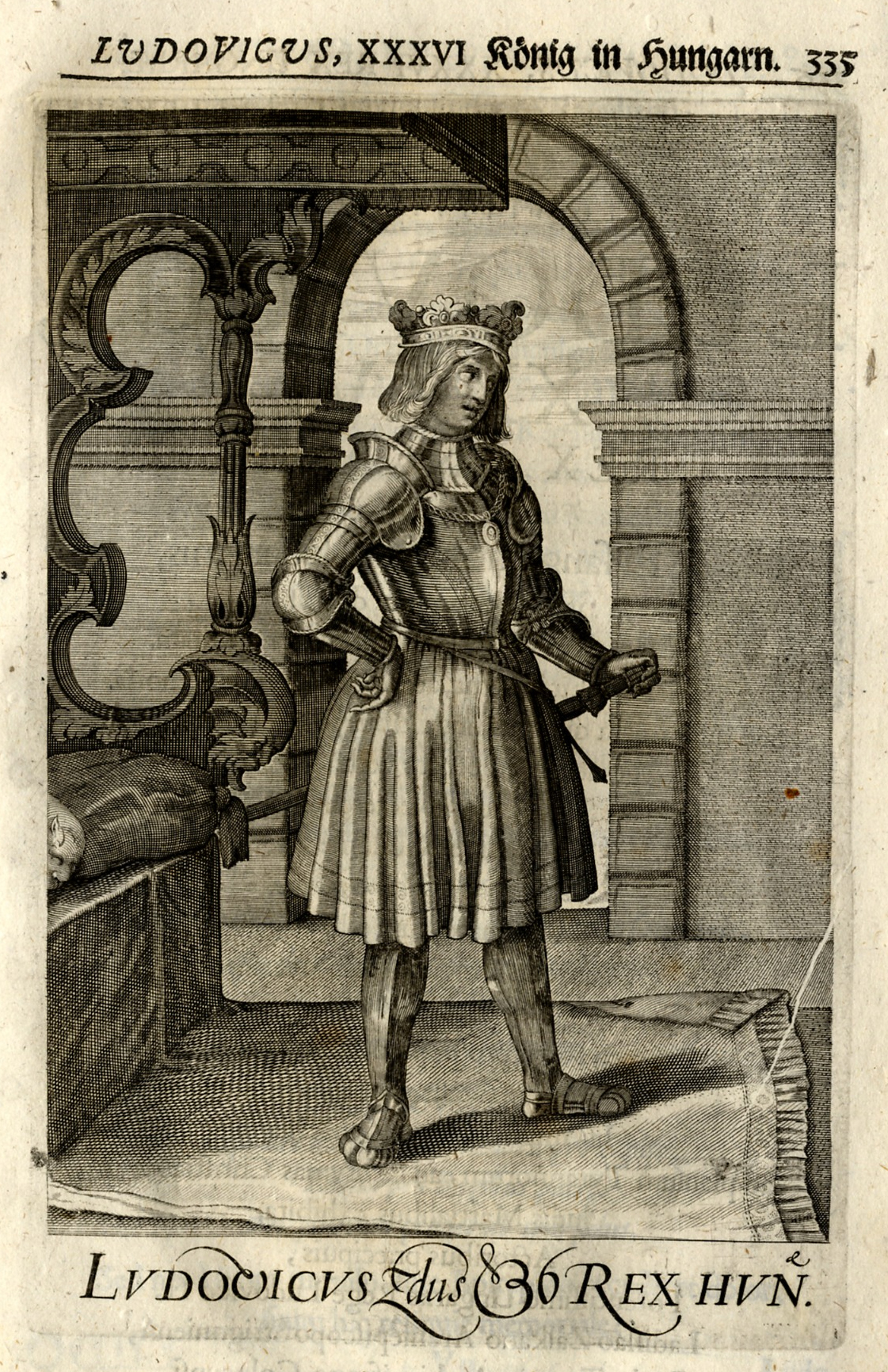
King Louis II of Hungary (Nádasdy Mausoleum, 1664)

After his father's death in 1516, the minor Louis II ascended to the throne of Hungary and Croatia. Louis was adopted by the Holy Roman Emperor Maximilian I in 1515. When Maximilian I died in 1519, Louis's cousin George, Margrave of Brandenburg-Ansbach, became his legal guardian.

Following the accession to the Ottoman throne of Suleiman I, the sultan sent Behram Çavuş as an ambassador to Louis II to collect the annual tribute that Hungary had been subjected to, and Louis refused to pay. According to some accounts, he also had the Ottoman ambassador executed and sent the head to the Sultan, but there is no evidence for this. Rather, Çavuş was kept waiting for years, virtually imprisoned in Buda, by way of revenge for Suleiman's father, Selim I, who from 1513 to 1519 had forced the Hungarian envoy Barnabás Bélayban, Ban of Serim, to travel with him on his campaigns into Persia and Egypt, and to find time to ask for financial help from western countries against the Ottomans. Louis believed that the Papal States and other Christian States including Charles V, Holy Roman Emperor, would help him. This hastened the fall of Hungary.

Hungary was in a state of near anarchy in 1520 under the rule of the magnates. The king's finances were a shambles; he borrowed to meet his household expenses despite the fact that they totaled about one-third of the national income. The country's defenses weakened as border guards went unpaid, fortresses fell into disrepair, and initiatives to increase taxes to reinforce defenses were stifled. By 1521 Sultan Suleiman the Magnificent was well aware of Hungary's weakness.

The Ottoman Empire declared war on the Kingdom of Hungary, Suleiman postponed his plan to besiege Rhodes and made an expedition to Belgrade. Louis and his wife Mary requested military aid from other European countries. His uncle, King Sigismund of Poland, and his brother-in-law, Archduke Ferdinand, were willing to help. Ferdinand dispatched 3,000 infantry troops and some artillery while preparing to mobilize the Austrian estates, while Sigismund promised to send footmen. However, the coordination process totally failed. Mary, although a determined leader, caused distrust by relying on non-Hungarian advisors while Louis lacked vigour, which his nobles realized. The Austrian military aid, although seemingly strengthening the border, even had the undesired effect of dissolving the unified leadership that the ban had held until that time.

Belgrade and many strategic castles in Serbia were captured by the Ottomans. This was disastrous for Louis' kingdom; without the strategically important cities of Belgrade and Šabac, Hungary, including Buda, was open to further Turkish conquests.

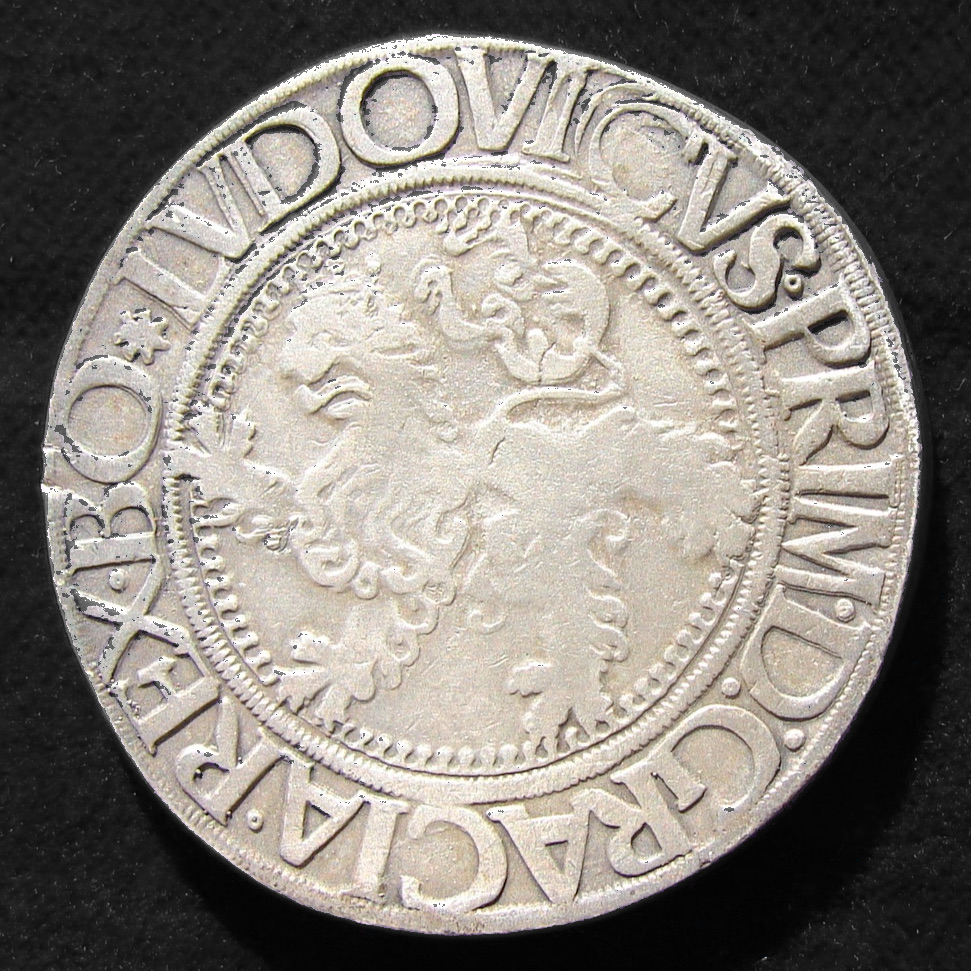
Joachimsthaler of the Kingdom of Bohemia (1525) was the first thaler (dollar). This is its reverse side, with the Bohemian Lion and the name of Louis / Ludovicus.

After the siege of Rhodes, in 1526 Suleiman made a second expedition to subdue all of Hungary. Around the middle of July, the young King departed from Buda, determined to "either fight back the invaders or be crushed once and for all". Louis made a tactical error when he tried to stop the Ottoman army in an open field battle with a medieval army, insufficient firearms, and obsolete tactics. On 29 August 1526, Louis led his forces against Suleiman in the disastrous Battle of Mohács. The Hungarian army was surrounded by Ottoman cavalry in a pincer movement, and in the center the Hungarian heavy knights and infantry were repulsed and suffered heavy casualties, especially from the well-positioned Ottoman cannons and well-armed and trained Janissary musketeers.

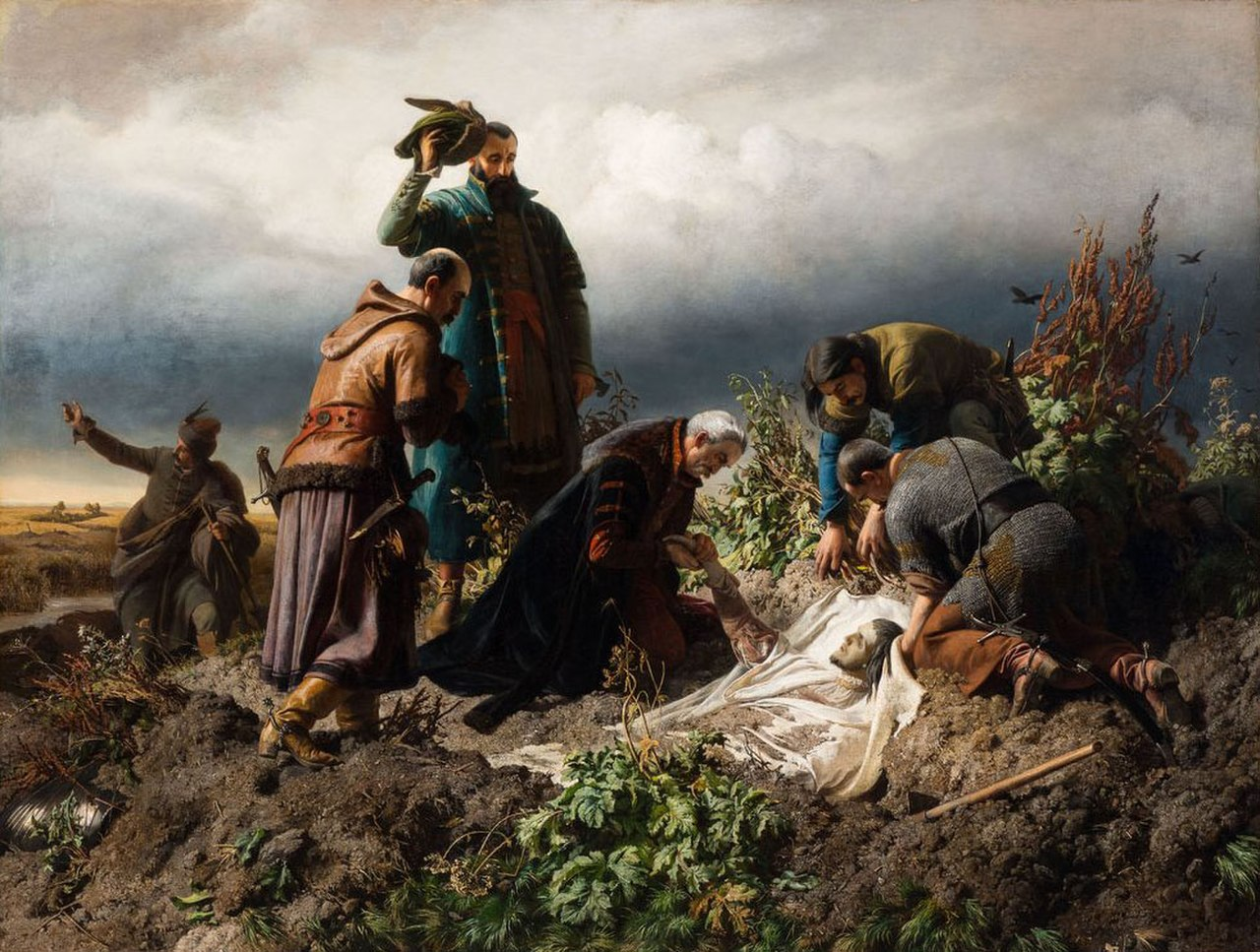
The discovery of the body of King Louis II after the Battle of Mohács. The 20-year-old king died when he fell backwards off his horse while trying to ride up a steep ravine of the Csele stream. (Bertalan Székely, 1860)

Nearly the entire Hungarian Royal army was destroyed in nearly 2 hours on the battlefield. During the retreat, the twenty-year-old king died when he fell backwards off his horse while trying to ride up a steep ravine of the Csele stream. He fell into the stream and, due to the weight of his armor, he was unable to stand up and drowned. Suleiman the Magnificent expressed regret at the death of his young adversary. Upon encountering the lifeless body of King Louis, the Sultan is said to have lamented: "I came indeed in arms against him; but it was not my wish that he should be thus cut off before he scarcely tasted the sweets of life and royalty."

After the death of Louis, Ferdinand (as husband to Louis' sister Anna), contested for the crown of Bohemia and Hungary. His bid for Hungary split the opinion of the magnates, with the majority electing John Zápolya. This split would later cause the majority of Hungary to be ruled under the Ottomans.

== Jagiellon bloodline ==
Although Louis II's marriage remained childless, he probably had an illegitimate child with his mother's former lady-in-waiting, Angelitha Wass. This son was called John (János in Hungarian). This name appears in sources in Vienna as either János Wass or János Lanthos. The former surname is his mother's maiden name. The latter surname may refer to his occupation. "Lanthos" means "lutenist", or "bard". He received incomes from the Royal Treasury regularly. He had further offspring.

== Legacy ==
North of the town of Mohacs, there is a 5 meter high monument to the memory of Louis II. It is located near the site of Louis' death at the Csele Stream. On the monument there is a bronze plaque which depicts Louis falling off his horse. On the top of the monument there is a figure of a sleeping lion. Soma Turcsányi, a Hussar lieutenant, at his own expense, constructed the original commemorative column in 1864. It was reconstructed in 1897. The monument was restored by the local government in 1986.

== Ancestry ==
Ancestors of Louis II of Hungary

16. Algirdas, Grand Duke of Lithuania
8. Vladislaus II Jagiellon
17. Uliana of Tver
4. Casimir IV Jagiellon
18. Andrew Ivanovich of Halshany
9. Sophia of Halshany
19. Alexandra Dmitrievna of Drutsk
2. Vladislas II of Hungary and Bohemia
20. Albert IV, Duke of Austria
10. Albert II, King of the Romans
21. Joanna Sophia of Bavaria
5. Elisabeth of Austria
22. Sigismund, Holy Roman Emperor
11. Elizabeth of Luxembourg
23. Barbara of Cilli
1. Louis II, King of Hungary and Bohemia
24.Gaston I of Foix-Grailly
12. John de Foix, 1st Earl of Kendal
25. Marguerite of Albret
6. Gaston, Count of Candale
26. Sir Thomas Kerdeston
13. Margaret Kerdeston
27. Elizabeth de la Pole
3. Anna of Foix
28. John I of Foix
14. Gaston IV of Foix
29. Jeanne d'Albret
7. Catherine of Foix
30. John II of Aragon
15. Eleanor of Navarre
31. Blanche I of Navarre

== Sources ==
- Agnew, Hugh (2013). The Czechs and the Lands of the Bohemian Crown. Hoover Institution Press.
- Cazacu, Matei (2017). Reinert, Stephen W. (ed.). Dracula. Brill.
- Heer, Friedrich (1995). The Holy Roman Empire. Phoenix Giant.
- Johnson, Lonnie (2011). Central Europe: Enemies, Neighbors, Friends. Oxford University Press.
- Rady, Martyn (2015). Customary Law in Hungary: Courts, Texts, and the Tripartitum. Oxford University Press.

== Bibliography ==
- Takings, Endorser: II. Lajos kinkily fiat (A Son of King Louis II Jagiellon), Salado (Periodical Centuries), pp.& NBS;183–185, 1903

Louis II of Hungary House of Jagiellon Born: 1 July 1506 Died: 29 August 1526
Regnal titles
Preceded by Vladislaus II	King of Bohemia; 1516–1526	Succeeded by Ferdinand I
Preceded by Vladislaus II	King of Hungary and Croatia; 1516–1526	Succeeded by John I as king of Eastern Hungary
Preceded by Vladislaus II	King of Hungary and Croatia; 1516–1526	Succeeded by Ferdinand I as king of Royal Hungary
