= Angelitha Wass =

Angelitha Wass (Hungarian: [ˈɒŋɡɛlitɒ ˈvɒʃʃ]; 15th century – after 1521) was a Hungarian lady's maid of Anne of Foix-Candale, Queen consort of Bohemia and Hungary, and later a mistress of Anne's son, Louis II Jagiellon, King of Hungary.

== Life ==
She became pregnant by King Louis and gave birth to an illegitimate son, János (John) Wass, self-titled "Prince John". John was never officially recognized as the son of the king. His and his mother's names appear in the sources of the Chamber in Pozsony (now Bratislava) as either János Wass or János Lanthos, which could refer to the fact that he used his mother's name first, then that of his occupation (lantos means 'lutanist, bard').

Angelitha Wass married a Hungarian nobleman but did not have any further issue. She died as a widow.

== Bibliography ==
- Takáts, Sándor: II. Lajos király természetes fia (A Natural Son of King Louis II Jagiellon), Századok (Periodical Centuries), 183–185, 1903.
- Kubinyi, András: Törvénytelen gyermekek a magyar középkorban. Utódok, örökösök, fattyúk (Illegitimate Children in Medieval Hungary. Offsprings, Successors, Bastards), História 21, 20–22, 1999. URL: See External Links
