= János Wass =

János Wass (Hungarian pronunciation: [ˈjaːnoʃ ˈvɒʃ]), or "Prince" John (16th century), was an illegitimate son of the ill-fated King Louis II of Hungary and Bohemia, who would die aged 20 at the Battle of Mohács. His mother was Angelitha Wass, formerly a lady's maid of the king's mother Anne of Foix-Candale.

== Life ==
His and his mother's names appear in the sources of the Chamber in Pozsony (now Bratislava) as either János Wass, taking his mother's surname, or János Lanthos, meaning John the Bard. He was never officially recognized as the son of King Louis, but he styled himself a prince nevertheless. He received regular subsidy from the court of King Ferdinand I of Germany, who was his uncle by his wife, Queen Anna Jagiellon, the sister of King Louis II and then of King Maximilian II, who was his cousin. With this financial backing he bought a house in Pozsony, where he lived with family and eventually died.

== Family ==
He had a large family; there was a rumour that his daughter gave birth to 20 children, and he demanded extra financial backing for his daughter's wedding.
