= Banat in the Middle Ages =

The Middle Ages in the Banat (a historical region in Central Europe which is now divided among Romania, Serbia and Hungary) started around 900. Around that time, Duke Glad ruled Banat, according to the Gesta Hungarorum (a chronicle of debated reliability). Archaeological finds and 10th-century sources evidence that Magyars (or Hungarians) settled in the lowlands in the early 10th century, but the survival of Avar, Slav and Bulgar communities can also be documented. A local chieftain, Ajtony, converted to Eastern Orthodoxy around 1000, but his attempts to control the delivery of salt on the Mureș River brought him into conflict with Stephen I of Hungary. Ajtony died fighting against the royal army in the first decades of the 11th century. His realm was transformed into a county of the Kingdom of Hungary. Counties (which were established around royal fortresses) were the most prominent units of royal administration.

Featuring items of the "Bijelo Brdo culture" (the dominant archaeological culture of the Carpathian Basin between around 950 and 1090) can be detected in the lowlands from around 975. Artefacts from the Byzantine Empire or imitating Byzantine objects were found along the Danube, and in the Banat Mountains. Pagan burial rites disappeared by the end of the 11th century, evidencing the local inhabitants' conversion to Christianity. Gerard, the first Bishop of Csanád (now Cenad in Romania), played a preeminent role in the process, according to hagiographic works written centuries later. More than a dozen monasteries (including at least three Orthodox monasteries) were established in the region before the mid-13th century.

The Mongol invasion of Hungary brought severe destruction in 1241–42, causing the disappearance of dozens of villages. After the withdrawal of the Mongols, new fortresses, made of stone, were built. Cumans settled in the lowlands around 1246. Their traditional nomadic way of life gave rise to conflicts with their neighbors for decades. Charles I of Hungary held his royal residence in Timișoara between 1315 and 1323. Colonization contributed to the development of the noblemen's estates in the 14th century. The presence of Vlachs (or Romanians) in the Banat Mountains can be documented from the same century. The expansion of the Ottoman Empire in the Balkan Peninsula forced thousands of Bulgarians and Serbs to leave their homelands and settle in Banat. Louis I of Hungary made several attempts to convert his Orthodox subjects into Roman Catholicism in Banat in the 1360s. The region became an important frontier zone after the Battle of Nicopolis in 1396. The ispáns (or heads) of Temes County were tasked with the defence of the frontier, which enabled them to unite most counties of Banat under their rule and to administer all royal fortresses in the region.

== Background ==
Map of the region of Banat, over modern borders

Banat is the modern name of the southeastern region of the Carpathian Basin in Central Europe. It is located between the rivers Danube, Tisza and Mureș, and the Apuseni Mountains. The Avar Khaganate was the dominant power of the Basin between around 567 and 803. Most historians agree that Slavs and Bulgars, together with the remnants of the Avars, and possibly with Vlachs (or Romanians), inhabited Banat after the fall of the khaganate. Contemporaneous sources only sporadically mentioned political events in 9th-century Banat. Archaeological finds that can certainly be dated to the 9th century are also rare. The only cemetery which yielded possibly 9th-century artefacts (Note: Including "Köttlach-type" earrings with bludgeon-like pendant.) was discovered at Deta, but similar objects were in use till the early 11th century.

After the disintegration of the Avar Khaganate, the Carolingian Empire and the First Bulgarian Empire made attempts to control Banat. Place names of Slavic origin recorded already in the Middle Ages (Note: For instance, Bârzava and Vicinic.) show the early presence of a Slavic-speaking population. The Royal Frankish Annals listed the Praedenecenti among the Slav peoples who sent "embassies and presents" to the Carolingian Empire in 822. The same source identified the Praedenecenti as Obotrites who "live in Dacia on the Danube as the neighbors of the Bulgars" when mentioning their envoys' visit in Aachen in 824. The term "Dacia" always referred to the ancient Roman province of Dacia Traiana (instead of the southern Dacia Aureliana) in 9th-century Western European sources, which suggests that the Praedenecenti lived to the north of the Danube, near its confluence with the Tisza. Around 850, a list of the peoples who lived along the eastern borders of the Carolingian Empire mentioned the Merehani as the southernmost neighbors of the empire to the north of the Danube. According to a scholarly theory, refuted by most specialists, the source suggests that the polity mentioned by the Byzantine Emperor Constantine VII Porphyrogenitus as "great Moravia, the unbaptized" was located in Banat.

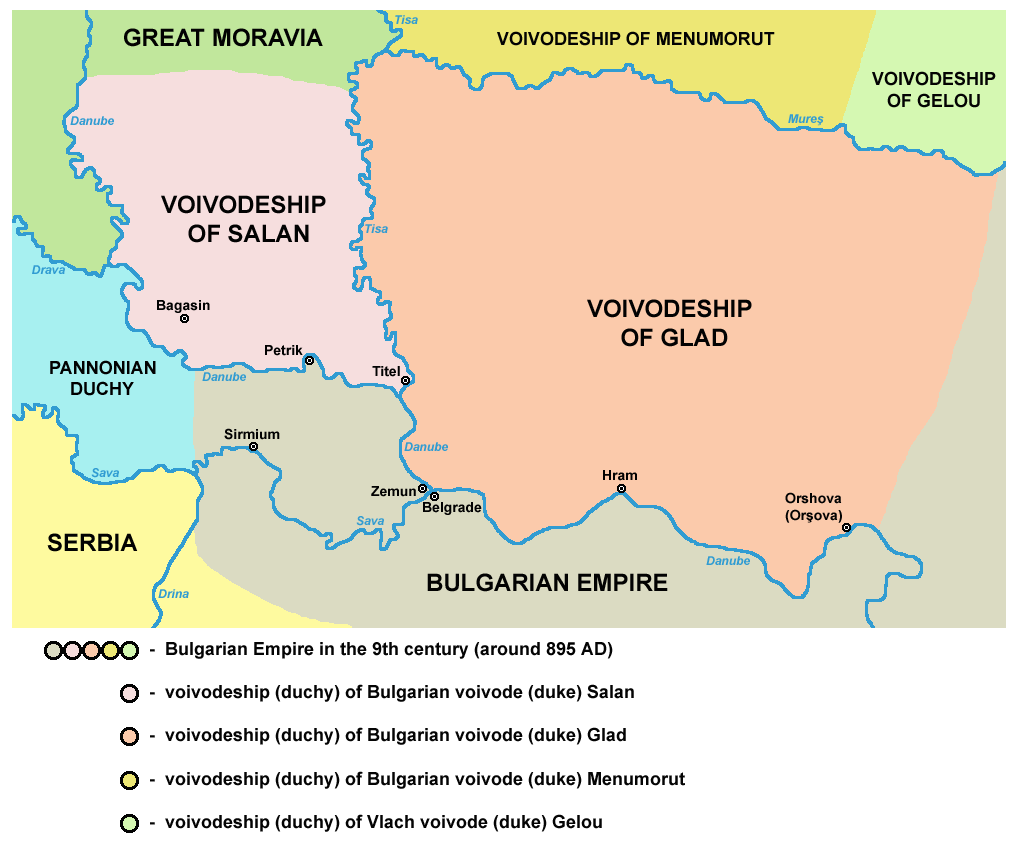
Glad's late 9th-century duchy and its neighbors (a map partially based on the narration of the Gesta Hungarorum, a late 12th-century chronicle of debated credibility)

Historians agree that the Bulgarian Empire dominated Banat during most of the 9th century. No contemporaneous source explicitly substantiates this idea, but the Bulgars' attempts to conquer their neighbors' territories are documented. The envoys of the Praedenecenti "complained about vicious aggression by the Bulgars and asked for help against them" during their visit in Aachen in 824. A Bulgar military commander, Onegavonais, drowned in the Tisza around 830, according to an inscription found at Provadia. Archaeologists often attribute a specific burial practice documented in the 9th and 10th centuries (the burial in coffins together with meat offerings) to the Bulgars, but the same burial rite had already been practised in the Avar Khaganate. Such graves cluster at the confluence of the Mureș and the Tisza, but graves with coffins and meat offerings were also unearthed at Nikolinci, Mehadia and other places in the lowlands. The name of the river Karaš, which is of Turkic origin, may have been inherited from the Bulgars, but it may also be attributed to the Pechenegs or other Turkic peoples who settled in Banat.

The first recorded invasion of the Magyars (or Hungarians) from the Pontic steppes to Central Europe occurred in 861. The Hungarian conquest of the Carpathian Basin started around 894. The contemporaneous Regino of Prüm recorded that the Magyars "attacked the lands of the Carinthians, Moravians and Bulgars" shortly after their arrival. The first extant Hungarian chronicle, the Gesta Hungarorum, which was written centuries after the events, contains a more detailed narration of the Hungarian Conquest. The chronicle wrote of one Duke Glad, who had come "from the castle of Vidin" in Bulgaria and ruled Banat at the time of the arrival of the Hungarians. Glad's army was "supported by Cumans, Bulgarians and Vlachs", according to the same source. Historians debate whether Glad was a historical figure, or the unknown author of the Gesta Hungarorum invented him and his duchy to be able to write of the Magyars' heroic deeds during the conquest of their new homeland.

== Kingdom of Hungary ==
=== Towards integration (c. 900–c.1003 or 1030) ===
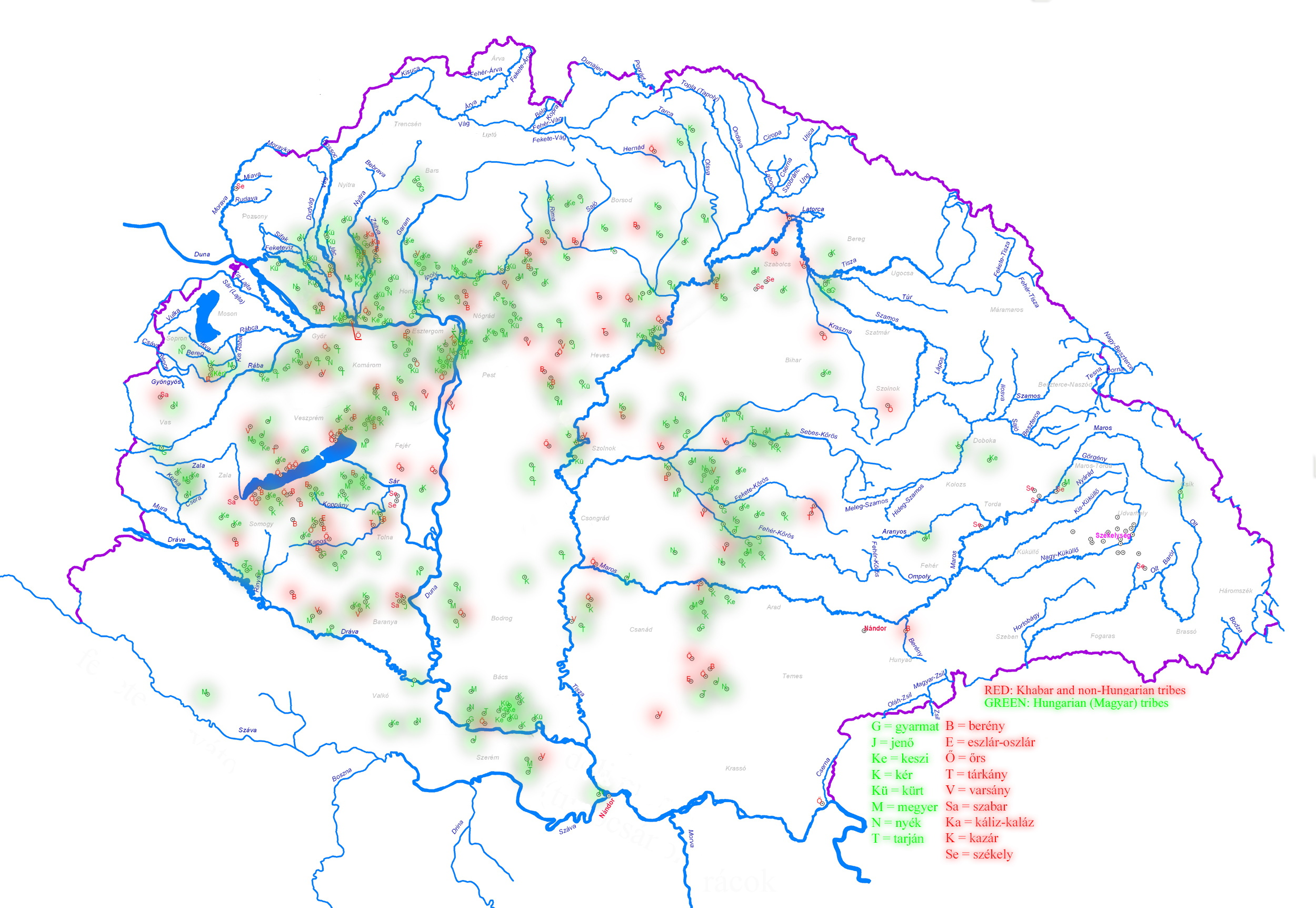
The appearance of Hungarian tribal names in settlement names, according to Sándor Török (Banat is located in the southeastern region of the Carpathian Basin)

A new burial horizon (documented at about forty places in the lowlands) appeared in Banat in the late 9th century. Small cemeteries and solitary burials feature it, showing that the nearby communities lived in small groups. The deceased were buried together with the skull or legs of their horses and with saddles, stirrups or other horse equipments. Sabers, swords, composite bows, quivers or other weapons, and ornamented belts were also placed in the graves of warriors. In women's graves, hairpins, earrings of the so-called "Saltovo" type bracelets, pendants, collar ornaments and buttons were found. The earliest graves of this "steppe burial horizon" (Note: For instance, at Dudeștii Vechi and Teremia Mare.) were found near the confluence of the Tisza and Mureș. They yielded no artefacts of Byzantine provenance. From the 930s, artifacts which either represented a new style emerging in the Carpathian Basin, (Note: Including, bracelets decorated with animal heads and double heart-shaped appliqués.) or were copied after Byzantine patterns were placed in the graves. The "steppe burial horizon" can archaeologically be detected till the last decades of the 11th century.

There are about a dozen 10th-century cemeteries with burial assemblages that differ from the "steppe burial horizon". The north-south orientation of a child's grave at Uivar and the deposition of a Byzantine coin in the child's mouth imply the presence of Bulgars. The deposition of coins in the mouth ("Charon's obol") was also documented in 10th-century graves found at Orșova and Deta. The "Köttlach-type" artefacts found at Deta have been attributed to Slavs from Carinthia, but other finds (including ornamented belts) may also indicate a multicultural community, using imported goods. Burial assemblages yielding artifacts from the Balkan Peninsula have been documented in about a dozen cemeteries, especially in the southern region. These isolated graves and small cemeteries may show the presence of a distinct ethnic group, or prove commercial contacts with the Balkan Peninsula. Both the custom of "Charon's obol" and the graves of the "South Danubian burial horizon" were attributed to the Vlachs (whose presence in Banat is mentioned in later sources), but neither hypotheses have been universally accepted. Historians, who say that the Vlachs were present in the region already in the 9th century, (Note: For instance, Viorel Achim and Radu Popa.) propose that the Vlachs either migrated to Bulgaria or fled to the Banat Mountains after the arrival of the Hungarians.

Around 950, Emperor Constantine Porphyrogenitus recorded that Hungarians inhabited the region to the north of the Iron Gates. He mentioned five rivers—the Timiș, the "Toutis", the Mureş, the Criş and the Tisza—that flow through the Hungarians' territory. Medieval settlements named after Hungarian tribes (Note: For example, Jeneu (at present-day Denta in Romania), (Egyazas)ker (near today's Ostojićevo in Serbia), and (Erdizad)kezi (now Chesinț).) confirm that Hungarian communities settled in the lowlands already in the 10th century. Rivers, mountains and settlements bearing Hungarian names in the Middle Ages (Note: For instance, the river Fizeș, the Almăj Mountains, and the village Secășeni.) also show the presence of Hungarian-speaking groups. The Byzantine historian John Skylitzes wrote of a Hungarian chieftain, Gylas, who was baptized in Constantinople in the early 950s. On this occasion, a Greek monk, Hierotheus was ordained "bishop of Turkey" (that is bishop of Hungary) to accompany Gylas back to his homeland. Bishop Hierotheus "converted many from the barbaric fallacy to Christianity", according to Skylitzes. Traditional scholarly consensus holds that Gylas ruled Transylvania (to the east of Banat), but the concentration of Byzantine coins minted between 948 and 959 at the confluence of the Tisza and the Mureş may indicate that Gylas's seat was located in Banat. The only 10th-century pectoral cross (a small copper cross) in the region was discovered at Deta.

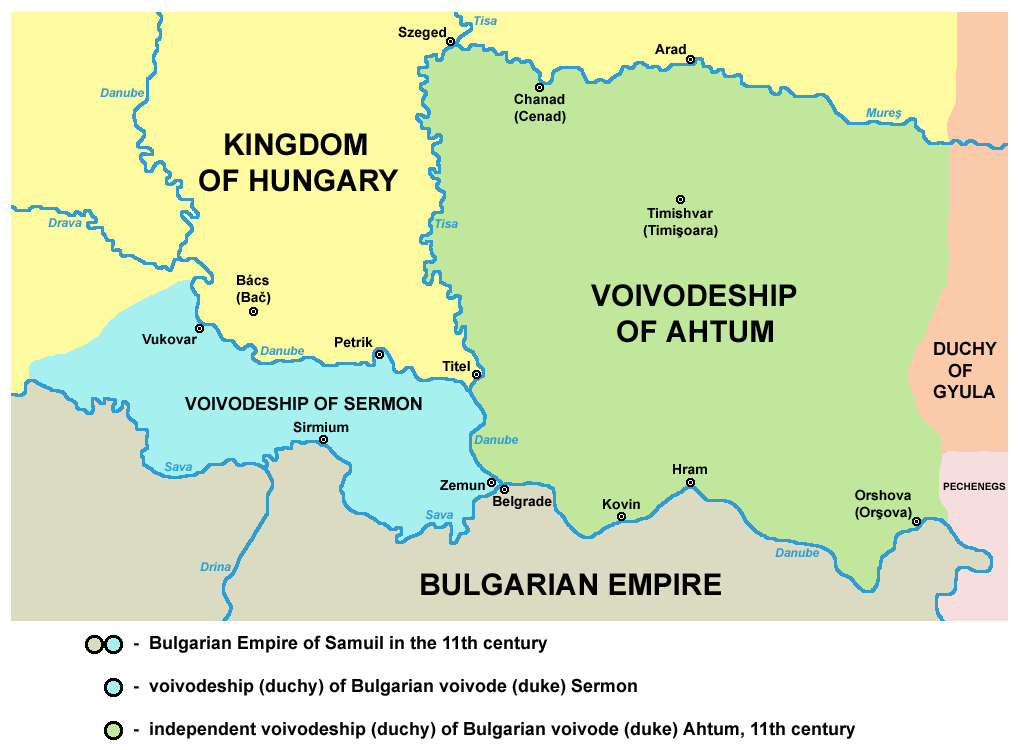
Ajtony's realm (often mentioned as "voivodeship" in Romanian historiography)

A new cultural synthesis, the so-called "Bijelo Brdo culture", emerged in the Carpathian Basin in the middle of the 10th century. Lock rings with S-shaped ends were its featuring items, but typical objects of the "steppe horizon" also survived, and the graves also yielded artefacts made after Byzantine patterns. The first cemeteries of this horizon, with their graves arranged in rows, appeared around 975, especially in the northwestern lowlands. In the large "Bijelo Brdo" cemeteries, graves of warriors (men buried with sabers or swords) were surrounded by hundreds of graves that did not yield weapons.

According to an edict of the Byzantine Emperor Basil II, issued in 1019, the Orthodox Bishopric of Braničevo had had a parish in "Dibiskos" during the reign of Samuel of Bulgaria, who died in 1014. Basil II confirmed the jurisdiction of the bishop of Braničevo in the same parish. Dibiskos seems to have been located near the Timiș (known as Tibiscus in Antiquity), suggesting that an Orthodox parish existed in Banat in the first decades of the 11th century. Historian Alexandru Madgearu also associated six 11th- and 12th-century churches excavated near the Mureș (Note: At Cenad, Pâncota, Săvârșin, Miniș, Mocrea, and Szőreg.) with Eastern Orthodoxy.

The Long Life of Saint Gerard (an early-14th-century compilation of earlier sources) wrote of a powerful chieftain, Ajtony, who had his seat in "urbs Morisena" on the Mureş around 1000. Ajtony's ethnicity is subject to debates among historians: he is proposed to have been of Hungarian, Kabar, Pecheneg or Bulgar stock. The Gesta Hungarorum described Ajtony as the descendant of Glad which gave rise to his presentation as the last member of a "native dynasty" in Romanian historiography. Ajtony was baptized in Vidin and established a monastery for Greek monks in his seat. He owned innumerable cattle and horses and wanted to levy tax on the salt delivered from Transylvania to Stephen I, the first king of Hungary, according to the Long Life of Saint Gerard. The king sent Csanád (Ajtony's former retainer who had deserted him) at the head of the royal army against Ajtony. Csanád defeated and killed Ajtony in a battle at an unspecified date (either around 1003 or around 1030).

=== Before the Mongol invasion (c. 1003 or 1030–1241) ===
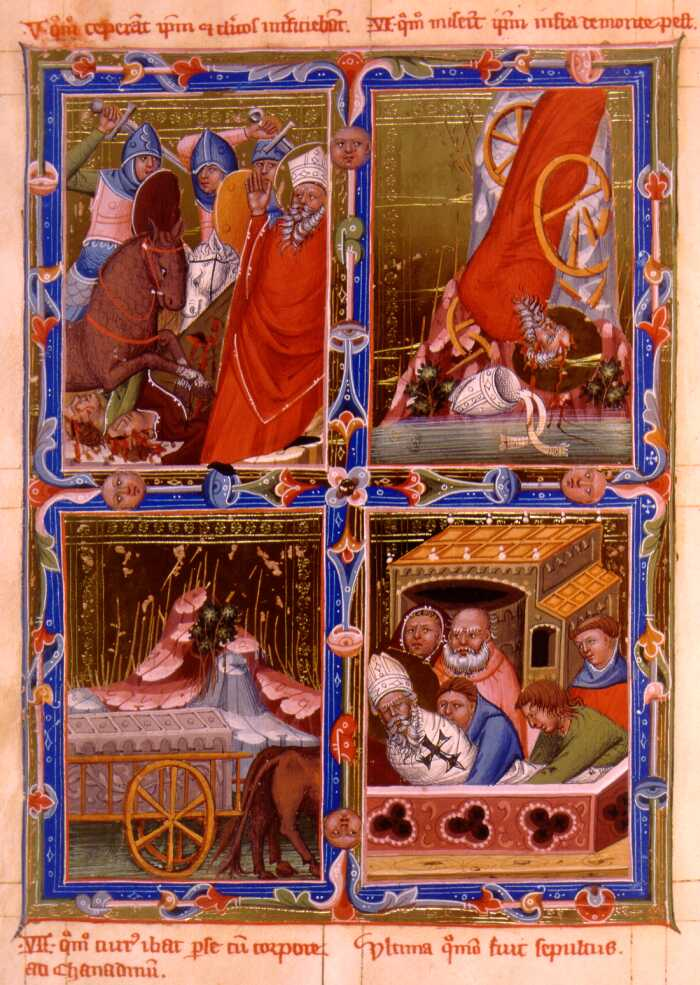
Martyrdom and funeral of Bishop Gerard of Csanád (from the Anjou Legendarium)

Stephen I of Hungary made Csanád the ispán (or head) of a new county, established in Ajtony's former realm, according to the Long Life of Saint Gerard. The counties were administrative units organized around fortresses, which were initially all possessed by the monarchs. According to a widely accepted scholarly theory, Csanád County included the whole Banat at the time of its establishment. It was mentioned for the first time in a royal charter in 1165.

Stephen I granted large estates to Csanád in Ajtony's former domains. Ajtony's former seat (which was renamed after Csanád) became the see of a bishopric of the Latin rite. A Benedictine monk from Venice, Gerard, was ordained bishop of Csanád in 1030, according to a record in the Annales Posonienses. The Greek monks, who had settled in Ajtony's seat, were transferred to a monastery that Csanád established for them at Banatsko Aranđelovo; their former monastery was granted to Benedictine monks.

Bishop Gerard's legends claim that the Christianization of Banat occurred peacefully. Many people visited Gerard, bringing horses, cattle, sheep, carpets, golden rings and necklaces (the most valuable goods of a nomadic society) to the saintly bishop, to receive baptism from him. However, the burying of warriors together with their horses and other pagan customs survived for decades. Bishop Gerard also referred to his conflicts with heretics in his Deliberatio supra hymnum trium puerorum. He was murdered in Buda during the great rebellion of pagan Hungarians in 1046.

The earliest cemeteries of the second phase of the "Bijelo Brdo culture" yielded coins minted during the reign of Stephen I. Thereafter only coins struck for Hungarian monarchs were deposited in 11th-century graves. The growing number of graves with deposited coins coincided with the gradual disappearance of featuring items of the "steppe burial horizon". Some "Bijelo Brdo" cemeteries (Note: For instance, the cemeteries excavated at Taraš, Kikinda and Banatsko Arandjelovo in Serbia, and at Cenad in Romania.) did not yield any "steppe" artefacts; instead, twisted or braided wire rings and other artefacts copying Byzantine style were put into the graves. Around 1100, a new burial horizon appeared in the Banat Mountains (Note: For instance, at Cuptoare, Svinița, and Caransebeș.) and along the Danube, (Note: For example, at Banatska Palanka and Vojlovica.) with graves arranged in rows, yielding artefacts imported from the Byzantine Empire or inspired by Byzantine style. Lock rings with S-shaped ends and other featuring "Bijelo Brdo" artefacts were also found in the same cemeteries. The deceased were buried with folded arms; their graves contained no weapons or food offerings. This "second South Danubian horizon" may represent either the development of a new fashion (influenced by contemporaneous Byzantine style), or the arrival of a new population.

Archaeological research evidence that 11th- and 12th-century peasants lived in huts which were partially dug into the soil. A rectangular hut with rounded corners, dated to the late 11th or early 12th century, was excavated at Ilidia. It was 6 by 4 metres (20 ft × 13 ft) in size; its entrance was a small corridor on its northeastern side. Similar dwellings from the 12th and 13th centuries were excavated at Gornea and Moldova Veche. Most semi-sunken huts had simple open fireplaces in the center or near the wall, but ovens were also found in some buildings. The local inhabitants used wheel-made vessels, especially jars, which were decorated by simple incisions and impressions. Bishop Gerard's hagiographies referred to the use of quern-stones in local households in the early 11th century. A 12th-century smithery was found at Gornea.

The Byzantine Empire and Hungary waged a series of wars against each other between 1127 and 1167. The Byzantine Emperor John II Komnenos routed a Hungarian army at Haram on the Danube (at present-day Banatska Palanka) in 1128. Thereafter he seized and sacked the nearby fortress. A Byzantine army also broke into Hungary at Haram in 1162.

After the Byzantine Empire disintegrated in the early 13th century, Byzantine style went out of fashion in Banat: both burial assemblages of the "second South Danubian horizon" and Byzantine coins disappeared. Neither can elements of the "Bijelo Brdo" burial assemblages be detected after around 1200. The graves of the "Late Arpadian burial horizon" did not contain weapons and food offerings. Instead of ornamented belt mounts, finger rings decorated with lilies or double crosses became important symbols of social status both in the lowlands and the mountains. Many 13th-century cemeteries (Note: For example, the cemeteries at Tiszasziget, Timișoara, Vršac, and Reșița.) developed in places that had not been previously occupied.

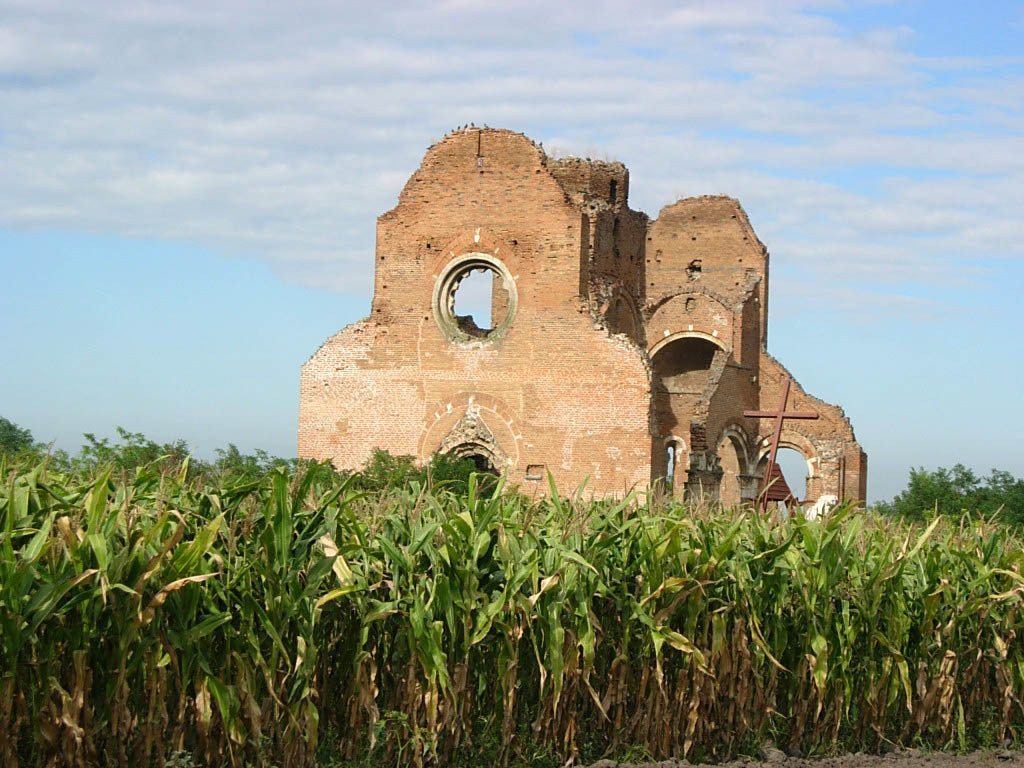
Ruins of the Benedictine monastery at Arač (in present-day Novi Bečej in Serbia)

New administrative units appeared in the sources. Temes County was first mentioned in 1172, Krassó County in 1200, Keve County in 1201 or in 1238, and Arad County in 1214. The land between the Cerna River and Almăj Mountains was incorporated in the newly established Banate of Severin (a border province of the Kingdom of Hungary) in the 1230s. The forts at Cenad and Haram were rebuilt in the early 13th century. Margaret (the sister of Andrew II of Hungary, and widow of the Byzantine Emperor Isaac II Angelos) held the forts at Ilidia and Kovin in 1223. Archaeological research has proved that a manor existed on a hill at Ilidia. Historian Dumitru Țeicu says that the fort at Ilidia evidences the process of the implementation of the Hungarian monarchs' rule among the local Vlachs in the early 13th century, because royal charter from the next century referred to the Vlachs living in the region of Ilidia.

The existence of new monasteries is documented from the early 13th century. The Benedictines owned abbeys at Arač, Bulci, Chelmac, Frumușeni and Şemlacu Mare; the Cistercians had a monastery in Igriș; Augustinian canons set up a house at Gătaia; and unidentified monks settled at Bodrogu Vechi, Bodrogu Nou and Pordeanu. Orthodox monasteries existed at Kusić and Partoş.

Local Pecheneg groups were first mentioned in 1230. In that year, King Andrew II of Hungary's son, Béla, reclaimed the Pechenegs' village, located near Igriș, that his father had granted to Ispán Nicholas Csák. The Pechenegs had obviously settled much earlier, but the circumstances of their arrival are unknown. Pecinișca, Peceneaga Valley and similar place names indicate that Pecheneg groups were also present in other places. Béla IV of Hungary allowed the Cumans whom the Mongols had defeated in the Pontic steppes to settle in the lowlands of Hungary in 1237. The Cumans' nomadic way of life caused conflicts with the local inhabitants who accused them of cooperating with the Mongols. After the supreme leader of the Cumans, Köten, was murdered near Pest in 1241, they left Hungary and settled in Bulgaria.

=== Mongol invasion and its consequences (1241–1316) ===
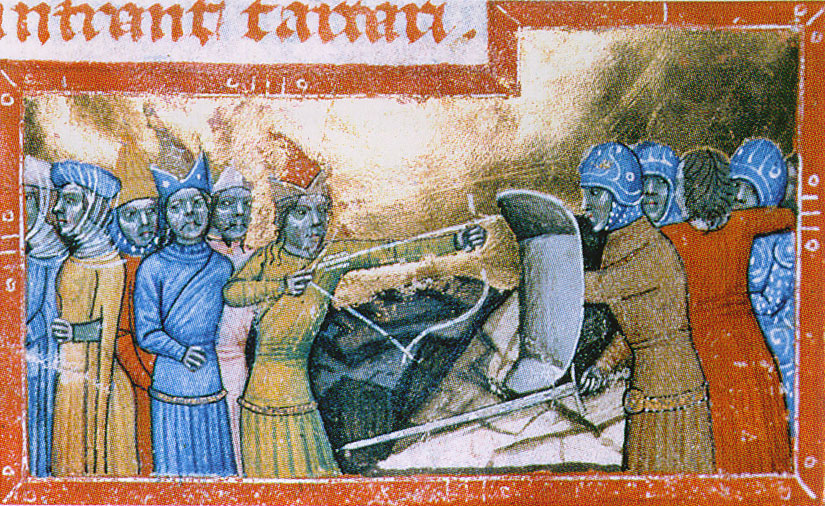
Mongol invasion of Hungary, 1241–42 (from the Illuminated Chronicle)

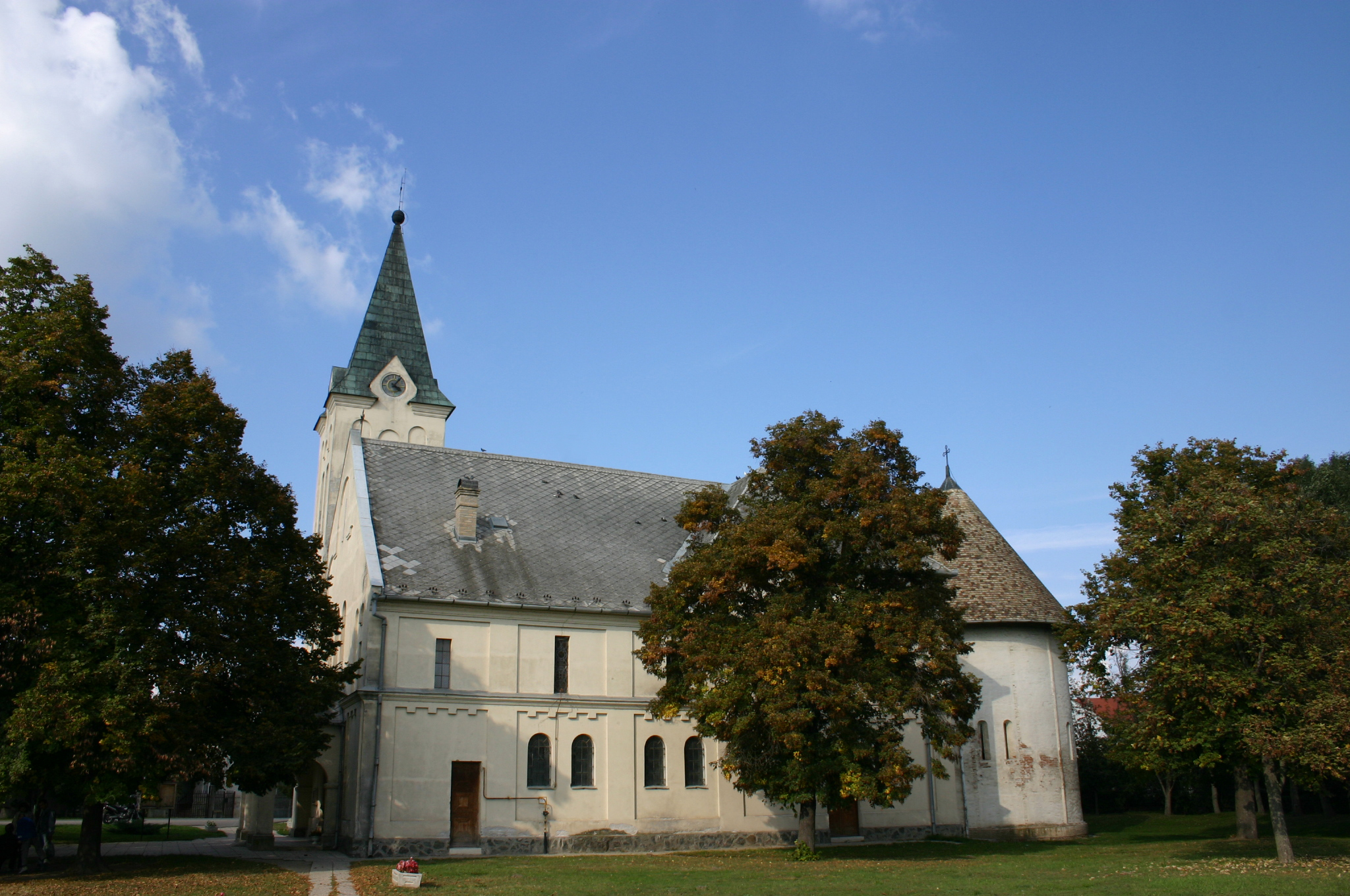
Church with a late 13th-century rotunda in Kiszombor, Hungary

The Mongols stormed into Hungary in March 1241. Roger of Torre Maggiore, a priest from Naples, gave a detailed description of their invasion. He fled from Oradea to Cenad, but a Mongol army had meanwhile seized and destroyed the town. The Mongols also captured Igriș Abbey and pillaged the neighboring territory. The Mongols withdrew from Hungary in March 1242, after having devastated large territories for months.

According to historian György Györffy, about 50-80 per cent of the settlements in the lowlands of Banat were abandoned during the Mongol invasion. He refers to a 1232 royal charter that listed 19-20 villages, out of which only 4 settlements were mentioned in documents written after the Mongol invasion. Archaeological research also evidences that many cemeteries were abandoned in the mid-13th-century, although the opening of new cemeteries at other places during the same period is also documented. Most royal fortresses, which were made of earth and timber, were abandoned and new stone forts were erected. Érdsomlyó (near Vršac) was first mentioned in 1255, and Caransebeș in 1290. Orșova and Timișoara developed into important centers of commerce. Genoese merchants who delivered their goods from the Black Sea to Buda travelled through the two settlements, according to a 1279 royal charters.

Béla IV persuaded many Cumans to return to Hungary in 1246. They were settled on royal domains in the Great Hungarian Plain. The Cumans enjoyed an autonomous status, but they were required to respect the property rights of the Hungarian noblemen and the Church. Two Cuman tribes settled in Banat, the Borchols and the Koors. Graves yielding torcs and other objects that are similar to 13th-century finds from the Pontic steppes were excavated at Tomaševac and Botoš. Place names recorded in the 14th century (Note: For instance, Kunfalva ("Cumans' village" in Hungarian) in Csanád County, and the river Buhui.) also indicate the presence of Cumans or other Turkic-speaking groups. The Cumans converted to Christianity, but their conversion was only superficial for almost a century.

Béla IV divided the kingdom with his son and heir, Stephen V, in 1262. Stephen, who adopted the titles "younger king" and "lord of the Cumans", received the lands to the east of the Danube. The kingdom was reunited when Béla IV died in 1270. Hungary plunged into anarchy during the reign of Stephen V's son, Ladislaus IV, who succeeded his father at the age of ten in 1272. Ladislaus was declared to be of age in 1277. A papal legate, Philip, Bishop of Fermo, persuaded him to make a promise to force the Cumans to abandon their pagan customs and to adopt a settled way of life. The Cumans rose up in 1280 and decided to leave Hungary. Although the royal army defeated them near Lake Hód to the east of the Tisza in 1280 or 1282, the Borchol tribe from Temes County and an unnamed nearby tribe managed to flee from the kingdom.

Most lords and prelates refused to obey the king in the late 1280s. Although Ladislaus's successor, Andrew III, was recognized as lawful monarch in 1290, the most powerful barons (or oligarchs) ruled their large domains independently of the monarch. After Andrew III died in 1301, no claimants to the throne could stabilize their positions for years. Taking advantage of the anarchy, Ladislaus Kán, Voivode of Transylvania, expanded his authority in the early 14th century. He seized the domains of the Archbishops of Kalocsa in Krassó County. A member of the Csanád clan, Theodore Vejtehi, entered into an alliance with Michael Shishman of Bulgaria and took control of the territory between the Timiș and the Lower Danube. Charles I of Hungary, who had been crowned king of Hungary in 1310, captured Vejtehi around 1315, but Vejtehi's sons were only forced to give up their fortress at Mehadia more than six years later.

=== Age of Angevins (1316–1395) ===
Charles I moved his court to Timișoara in early 1315 and fortified it. Building projects evidence that he planned to set up a new royal residence in the town, but he returned his seat to the middle of Hungary in 1323. During Charles I's reign, new stone fortresses were built, (Note: For instance, at Jdioara, Şemlacu Mare and Orșova.) not independently of Charles I's conflicts with Basarab I of Wallachia. Franciscan friars settled in Lipova, Orșova and other places, Dominicans in Timișoara, and Pauliens in Gătaia before the middle of the 14th century. The Franciscans promoted a simplified version of Gothic architecture. Abutments excavated in Berzovia suggest that a Gothic church was built in the village after around 1350.

Agricultural techniques are documented from the 14th century. Manured plowing lots were first mentioned in 1323. Archaeological evidence of the shoeing of horses can be dated to the same century. Frequent references to conflicts in connection with horses and oxen show the importance of draft animals in local economy. Pork was the most important meat in the peasants' diet, according to archaeological evidence from Remetea. Fishing, and hunting for wild boars, deer, aurochs, beavers, martens and badgers in medieval Banat is also well-documented. Local noblemen practised falconry.

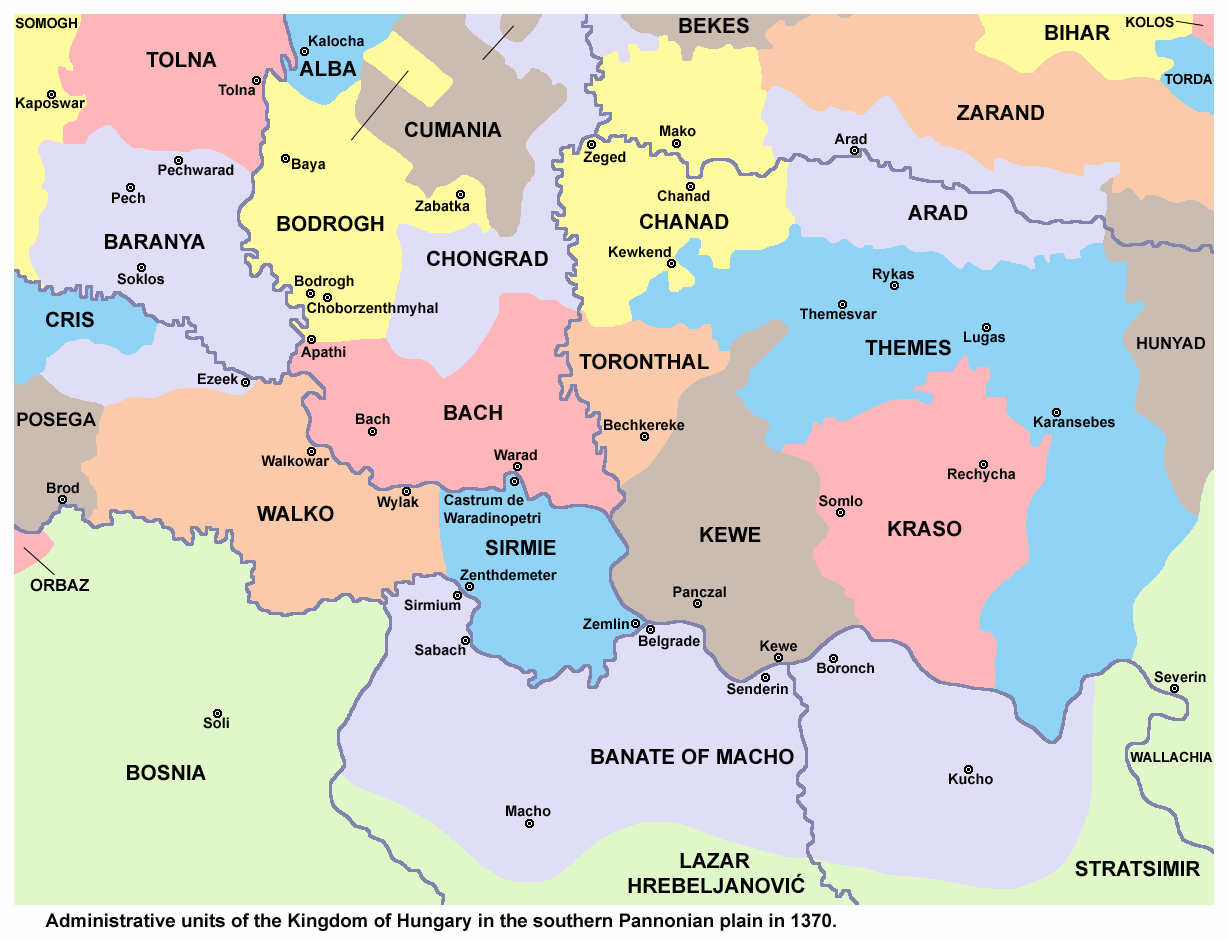
The counties in Banat and the neighboring territories around 1370

Vineyards existed at Ciortea, Banatska Subotica and Recaș. Water mills functioned along the rivers Nera, Caraș, Bârzava and Pogăniș. Mills yielded significant income to the noblemen, because the peasants were to grind their wheat there. The Himffys earned a yearly income of 5,5 florins from the mills in their domain at Remetea. In 1372, Louis I prescribed that the peasants along the Timiș were to be use the royal mills. The iron mines in the Dognecea Mountains were the monarchs' property. Regional fairs held at "Bodugazonfalwa" (near Cenad), Semlac, Veliko Središte and other villages were mentioned in 14th-century royal charters. Timișoara and Lipova were the most prosperous towns in Banat.

Local noblemen invited "guest settlers" to their estates, granting them tax exemption for three years and the right to free movement. The Cuman Ispán Kondam settled peasants at Beba Veche and at "Halazmortva" (near Senta in Serbia) in 1321, the Telegdis invited "guest settlers" to their five villages (Note: Banatski Monoštor, "Weresdub" (near the river Aranca), Banatsko Aranđelovo, Pordeanu and "Keer" (near present-day Ostojićevo in Serbia).) in 1337. Notable people also moved to Banat during the 14th century. Ladislaus Jánki, Archbishop of Kalocsa, conducted negotiations with one Voivode Bogdan, son of Mikola, on King Charles's behalf about the movement of the voivode and his people "from his country" (Serbia or Wallachia) to Hungary between the autumn of 1334 and the summer of 1335. Charles I's son, Louis I of Hungary, granted more than ten villages near the Recaș River to the six sons of a Wallachian lord, who had "left all their estates and goods" in their homeland after a conflict between King Louis and Nicholas Alexander of Wallachia.

Royal charters from the 14th century evidence that Vlachs (or Romanians) were present in Banat. The first recorded place name of Romanian origin (Note: "Caprewar" from Căprioara) was mentioned on a list of the Telegdis' villages in Arad County in 1337. By the end of the century, a dozen Vlach districts (Note: For instance, Sebeș and "Comyath" (on the Pogăniș River were mentioned in 1369, Bârzava (along the upper course of the eponymous river) in 1370, Mehadia in 1376 or 1387, Lugoj in 1385, Caran in 1391.) were mentioned in Banat. The Vlachs' local leaders, who were titled either as knezes or voivodes, were mentioned from around 1350. Their residences and the Orthodox churches built in their estates can archaeologically be documented from the same century. At Reșița a dwelling tower was erected on a hill, at Berzovia a wooden manor was built on a hill near the Bârzava River in the second half of the century. Written sources do not reveal which Orthodox bishopric had jurisdiction over the Orthodox parishes in Banat.

The Orthodox Vlachs were not required to pay the tithe which was payable by all Catholic peasants to the Church. In 1328, Pope John XXII stated that the obligatory payment of tithes was one of the main obstacles of the conversion of non-Catholics (including Cumans and Vlachs) in Hungary. The Vlachs paid a special in kind tax, the quinquagesima (or "fiftieth") after their sheep, which shows that sheep-breeding was their principal economic.

Conflicts relating Vlach knezes were also mentioned in royal charters. In 1333, the noble Paul Magyar's servant and Knez Bratan jointly invaded the Himffys' estates at Remetea-Pogănici; in 1357, three Vlach knezes sued the noble John Besenyő for two estates on the upper course of the Karaš in 1357, stating that Charles I of Hungary had granted them the estates; in 1364, the noble Andrew Torma accused Knez Demetrius of Comyan of having destroyed his estate at "Zlawotynch" (near present-day Gătaia). According to historian Ion-Aurel Pop, these acts of violence demonstrate the knezes' attempt to protect their ancient property rights against the Hungarian noblemen. Historian István Petrovics writes that the pastoralist way of life of the Vlachs, who were newcomers in Banat, gave rise to their conflicts with their more settled neighbors.

Louis I of Hungary, who made several attempts to expand his authority over Wallachia and Bulgaria, regarded the southern region of Banat as an important military zone. He confirmed the privileges of the Pechenegs who lived in their village in Csanád County, stating that they had "the duty to bear arms according to ancient custom". After the conquest of Vidin in Bulgaria in 1365, Louis I decided to convert the local Orthodox population into Roman Catholicism. His chronicler, John of Küküllő, also recorded that Louis I ordered the nobles and townspeople of Keve and Krassó Counties to gather the local "Slavic priests ... together with their children, wives and all their possession" to be again baptized according to Catholic rite. According to a royal charter issued in 1428, Louis I also decreed that only Catholic noblemen were allowed to own landed property in the region of Caransebeș.

=== Ottoman threat (1395–1526) ===
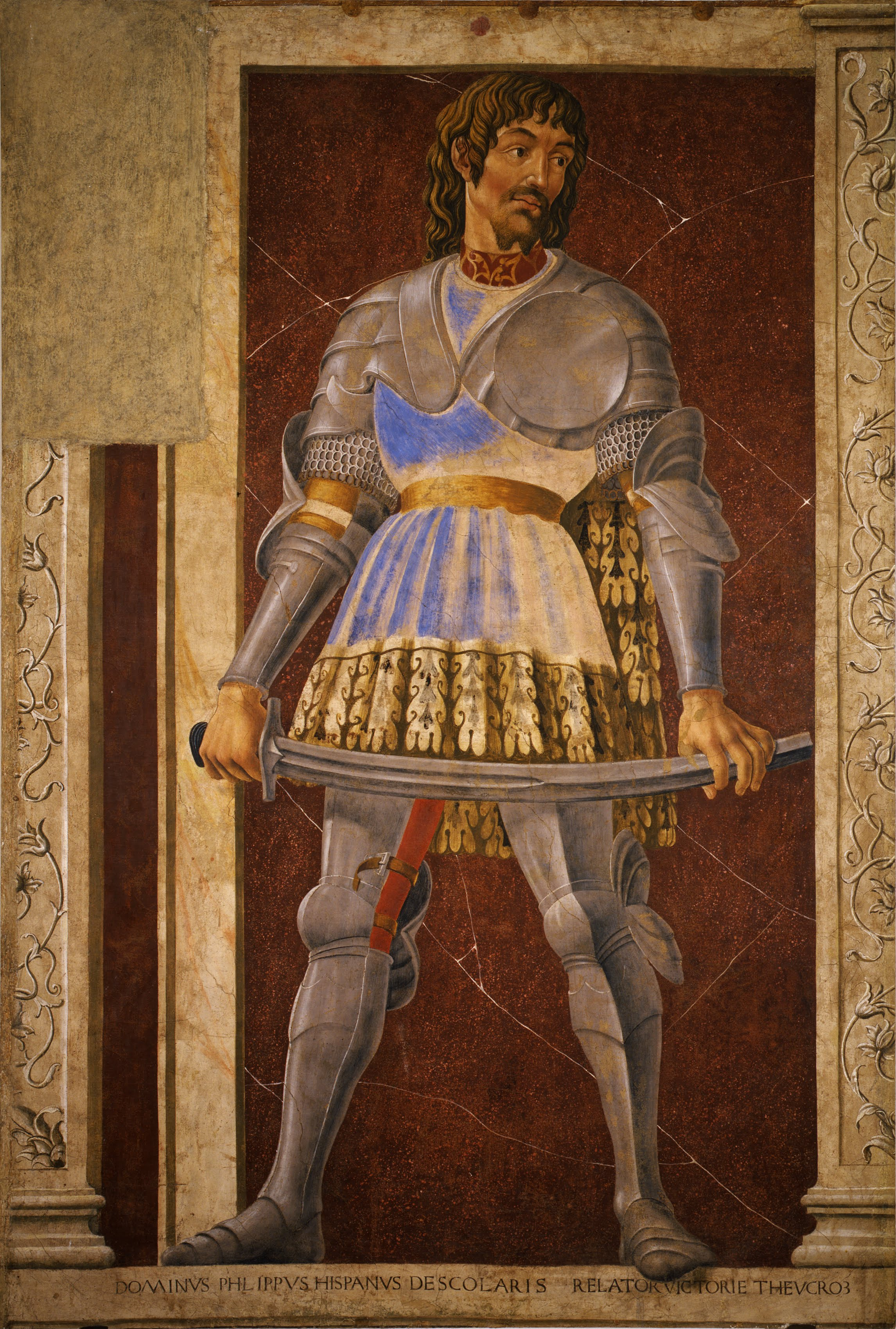
Filippo Scolari, ispán (or head) of Temes County and other six counties in the early 15th century (fresco by Andrea del Castagno)

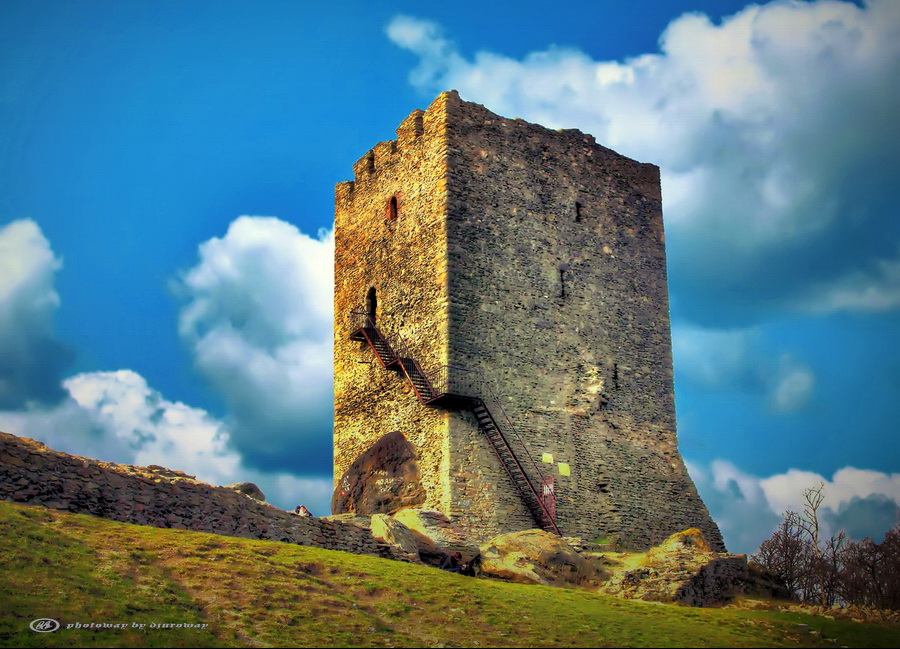
15th-century tower in Vršac (Serbia)

The Ottoman Sultan Bayezid I launched a crushing defeat on the united army of Hungary, Wallachia and Western European crusaders in the Battle of Nicopolis on 25 September 1396. Shortly thereafter, thousands of refugees came from Bulgaria to Banat and settled in the region of Lipova. Sigismund of Luxemburg, who had been king of Hungary since 1387, held a Diet in Timișoara in October 1397 to increase the defence of Hungary against the Ottoman Empire. A decree adopted at the Diet prescribed that each noblemen were to equip an archer from every peasant tenants on their estates.

Sigismund made the Italian Filippo Scolari ispán of Temes and other six counties in southeastern Hungary in 1404. The ispáns of Temes still held royal castles and the domains attached to them in their county. Scolari rebuilt and strengthened the fortresses, and erected 14 new forts along the Danube. Sigismund granted large domains (including Bečkerek and Vršac in Banat) to Stefan Lazarević, Despot of Serbia, in 1411 to strengthen his loyalty. Scolari's death in 1426 put an end to the united administration of the seven southern counties. Lazarević also died in 1427 and his domains in Hungary were inherited by Đurađ Branković, the new Despot of Serbia.

Ottoman documents from the 1570s mention seven Eastern Orthodox monasteries in the mountainous region. The existence of four of them (Note: The monasteries at Kusić and Baziaș, and at the rivers Mraconia and Sirinia.) can also be archaeologically evidenced. The simple tri-clone plan of the churches (which appeared in Serbia in the 14th century and also spread in Wallachia) show that they were erected after around 1400.

Sigismund granted all royal possessions in Banat and the Banate of Severin to the Teutonic Knights in 1429. The Knights estimated the expenses of the defence at about 315,000 golden florins a year. To meet the expenses, they were granted significant sources of income, including the royal revenues from two Transylvanian mints, the taxes paid by the Jász people and the Cumans for two years and the "fifth" levied on the Vlachs for three years. However, the Ottomans seriously defeated the Knights in 1432 and they abandoned Banat.

John Hunyadi and Nicholas Újlaki, who were also voivodes of Transylvania and counts of the Székelys, were jointly made the ispáns of Temes, Arad, Csanád, Keve and Krassó Counties in 1441, thus again uniting the administration of most Banat. Hunyadi granted nobility to at least five Vlach knezes in Temes County after the Diet of Hungary elected him governor of the kingdom in 1446. The new status of the local knezes did not influence the position of the Vlach commoners who lived in the knezes' estates, because they preserved their liberties, including their right to be judged by elected jurors. Ladislaus V of Hungary mortgaged the office of the ispán of Temes, along with all royal fortresses and domains attached to it, to Hunyadi in 1455.

The administration of the southern frontier was again reformed during the reign of Hunyadi's son, Matthias Corvinus. He granted the new title of "captain general of the inferior parts" to the ispán of Temes County, tasking him with the defense of all royal castles on the border from Belgrade to Turnu Severin in 1479. The new official was also authorized to collect all royal taxes in the southern counties. Paul Kinizsi, Ispán of Temes, and the voivode of Transylvania, Stephen Báthory, joined forces to expel Ottoman marauders from Transylvania in 1479.

Being exposed to raids from the Ottoman Empire, the settlement structure of Banat underwent significant changes from the beginning of the 15th century. The Cseri domain in Temes County included more than 70 villages inhabited by Hungarian or Vlach peasants in the early 15th century, but more than 50 of them had been abandoned by the first decade of the 16th century. Out of the 168 settlements where Catholic parishes were documented in the 14th century, only about 115 survived till the mid-16th century. Most of the surviving villages were inhabited by Serbs. Serbs came to the southern region in five major waves during the reigns of Sigismund and Matthias Corvinus. They settled in the lowlands of Keve, Krassó, Temes and Torontal Counties where Catholic peasants had lived a century earlier, according to papal registers. During Corvinus's reign, thousands of mainly Serbian peasants were granted the status of vojnik ("warrior"). They were exempted of taxes, but they were required to provide military service on the frontier.

Paul Kinizsi was one of the main supporters of Vladislaus, King of Bohemia, who was elected king of Hungary after the death of Corvinus in 1490. The Ottomans made regular incursions against southern Hungary during the following years, but they could not capture important fortresses. Hungary and the Ottoman Empire signed a peace treaty in 1503, which was renewed in 1510 and in 1511.

After the new Ottoman Sultan, Selim II, started a new war against Hungary in 1512, Pope Leo X authorized Tamás Bakócz, Archbishop of Esztergom, to proclaim a crusade against the Ottomans. About 40,000 peasants took up arms against the Ottomans and Bakócz made the Székely soldier, György Dózsa, the commander of the crusader army on 25 April 1514. After the peasants refused to pay taxes and began plundering the noblemen's manors, Vladislaus, ordered them to disband. Dózsa did not obey the king's command and routed the united army of Stephen Báthory, Ispán of Temes, and Nicholas Csáki, Bishop of Csanád, at Apátfalva on 23 May. Dózsa even had the bishop captured and impaled. The peasants seized Lipova and Șoimoș, and laid siege to Timișoara. John Zápolya, Voivode of Transylvania, came to assist Báthory who defended the town. Zápolya defeated the peasants on 15 July and captured Dózsa, who was tortured and executed.

== Sources ==
=== Primary sources ===
- Anonymus, Notary of King Béla: The Deeds of the Hungarians (Edited, Translated and Annotated by Martyn Rady and László Veszprémy) (2010). In: Rady, Martyn; Veszprémy, László; Bak, János M. (2010); Anonymus and Master Roger; CEU Press; ISBN 978-963-9776-95-1.
- Constantine Porphyrogenitus: De Administrando Imperio (Greek text edited by Gyula Moravcsik, English translation by Romillyi J. H. Jenkins) (1967). Dumbarton Oaks Center for Byzantine Studies. ISBN 0-88402-021-5.
- John Skylitzes: A Synopsis of Byzantine History, 811-1057 (Translated by John Wortley, with Introductions by Jean-Claude Cheynet and Bernard Flusin and Notes by Jean-Claude Cheynet) (2010). Cambridge University Press. ISBN 978-0-521-76705-7.
- Royal Frankish Annals (1972). In: Carolingian Chronicles: Royal Frankish Annals and Nithard's Histories (Translated by Bernhard Walter Scholz with Barbara Rogers); The University of Michigan Press; ISBN 0-472-06186-0.
- The Chronicle of Regino of Prüm (2009). In: History and Politics in Late Carolingian and Ottonian Europe: The Chronicle of Regino of Prüm and Adalbert of Magdeburg (Translated and annotated by Simon MacLean); Manchester University Press; ISBN 978-0-7190-7135-5.

=== Secondary sources ===
- Blazovich, László (1994). "Alföld; Bánát". In Kristó, Gyula; Engel, Pál; Makk, Ferenc (eds.). Korai magyar történeti lexikon (9–14. század) [Encyclopedia of the Early Hungarian History (9th–14th centuries)] (in Hungarian). Akadémiai Kiadó. pp. 36, 78. ISBN 963-05-6722-9.
- Curta, Florin (2001). "Transylvania around A.D. 1000". In Urbańczyk, Przemysław (ed.). Europe around the year 1000. Wydawn. DiG. pp. 141–165. ISBN 978-837-1-8121-18.
- Curta, Florin (2006). Southeastern Europe in the Middle Ages, 500-1250. Cambridge University Press. ISBN 978-0-521-89452-4.
- Eggers, Martin (2001). "Die südöstlichen Nachbarn des Karolingerreiches im 9. Jahrhundert [The Southeastern neighbors of the Carolingian Empire in the 9th century]". In Erkens, Franz-Reiner (ed.). Karl der Groβe und das Erbe der Kulturen [Charlemagne and the Heritage of Cultures]. Akademie Verlag. pp. 159–168. ISBN 3-05-003581-1.
- Engel, Pál (2001). The Realm of St Stephen: A History of Medieval Hungary, 895–1526. I.B. Tauris Publishers. ISBN 1-86064-061-3.
- Gáll, Erwin (2013). Az Erdélyi-medence, a Partium és a Bánság 10-11. századi temetői [10th-11th-century Cemeteries from the Transylvanian Basin, the Partium and the Banat] (in Hungarian). Szegedi Tudományegyetem Régészeti Tanszéke, Magyar Nemzeti Múzeum, Magyar Tudományos Akadémia Bölcsészettudományi Kutatóközpont Régészeti Intézet. ISBN 978-963-306-197-8.
- Györffy, György (1987a). Az Árpád-kori Magyarország történeti földrajza, I: Abaújvár, Arad, Árva, Bács, Baranya, Bars, Békés, Bereg, Beszterce, Bihar, Bodrog, Borsod, Brassó, Csanád és Csongrád megye [Historical Geography of Hungary of the Árpáds, Volume I: The Counties of Abaújvár, Arad, Árva, Bács, Baranya, Bars, Békés, Bereg, Beszterce, Bihar, Bodrog, Borsod, Brassó, Csanád and Csongrád] (in Hungarian). Akadémiai Kiadó. ISBN 963-05-4200-5.
- Györffy, György (1987b). Az Árpád-kori Magyarország történeti földrajza, III: Heves, Hont, Hunyad, Keve, Kolozs, Komárom, Krassó, Kraszna, Küküllő megye és Kunság [Historical Geography of Hungary of the Árpáds, Volume I: The Counties of Heves, Hont, Hunyad, Keve, Kolozs, Komárom, Krassó, Kraszna, Küküllő, and the Kunság] (in Hungarian). Akadémiai Kiadó. ISBN 963-05-3613-7.
- Kristó, Gyula (1994). "Vejtehi Teodor [Teodor of Voiteg]". In Kristó, Gyula; Engel, Pál; Makk, Ferenc (eds.). Korai magyar történeti lexikon (9–14. század) [Encyclopedia of the Early Hungarian History (9th–14th centuries)] (in Hungarian). Akadémiai Kiadó. p. 722. ISBN 963-05-6722-9.
- Kristó, Gyula (2001). "The Life of King Stephen the Saint". In Zsoldos, Attila (ed.). Saint Stephen and His Country: A Newborn Kingdom in Central Europe – Hungary. Lucidus Kiadó. pp. 15–36. ISBN 963-86163-9-3.
- Madgearu, Alexandru (1998). "Geneza şi evoluţia voievodatului bănăţean din secolul al X-lea [Genesis and evolution of the voivodeship in Banat in the 10th century]". Studii şi Materiale de Istorie Medie (in Romanian). 16. Institutul de Istorie Nicolae Iorga: 191–207. ISSN 1222-4766.
- Madgearu, Alexandru (2001). "The Church Organization at the Lower Danube, between 971 and 2001". Études byzantines et post-byzantines. IV. Academia română: 71–85. ISSN 1222-4766.
- Madgearu, Alexandru (2013). Byzantine Military Organization on the Danube, 10th–12th Centuries. Brill. ISBN 978-90-04-21243-5.
- Makkai, László (1994). "The Emergence of the Estates (1172–1526)". In Köpeczi, Béla; Barta, Gábor; Bóna, István; Makkai, László; Szász, Zoltán; Borus, Judit (eds.). History of Transylvania. Akadémiai Kiadó. pp. 178–243. ISBN 963-05-6703-2.
- Oța, Silviu (2014). The Mortuary Archaeology of Medieval Banat. Brill. ISBN 978-90-04-21438-5.
- Pálóczi Horváth, András (1989). Pechenegs, Cumans, Iasians: Steppe Peoples in Medieval Hungary. Corvina. ISBN 963-13-2740-X.
- Petrovics, István (2008). A középkori Temesvár: Fejezetek a Bega-parti város 1552 előtti történetéből [Medieval Timișoara: Chapters of the History of the Town on the Bega before 1552] (in Hungarian). JATE Press. ISBN 978-963-482-867-9.
- Petrovics, István (2009). "Foreign Ethnic Groups in the Towns of Southern Hungary in the Middle Ages". In Keene, Derek; Nagy, Balázs; Szende, Katalin (eds.). Segregation-Integration-Assimilation: Religious and Ethnic Groups in the Medieval Towns of Central and Eastern Europe. Ashgate. pp. 67–88. ISBN 978-0-7546-6477-2.
- Pop, Ioan-Aurel (2013). "De manibus Valachorum scismaticorum...": Romanians and Power in the Mediaeval Kingdom of Hungary: The Thirteenth and Fourteenth Centuries. Peter Lang Edition. ISBN 978-3-631-64866-7.
- Sophoulis, Panos (2011). Byzantium and Bulgaria, 775-831. Brill. ISBN 978-90-04-20695-3.
- Țeicu, Dumitru (2002). Mountainous Banat in the Middle Ages. University Press Cluj. ISBN 973-610-141-X.
- Treptow, Kurt W.; Popa, Marcel (1996). Historical Dictionary of Romania. Scarecrow Press, Inc. ISBN 0-8108-3179-1.
- Szentkláray, Jenő (1911). Temes vármegye története – Temesvár története (in Hungarian). Budapest: Országos Monografia Társaság.
- Hațegan, Ioan; Boldea, Ligia; Țeicu, Dumitru (2006). Cronologia Banatului: Banatul între 934–1552 (PDF) (in Romanian). Timișoara: Editura Banatul. ISBN 973-7836-56-1.
