= Kingdom of Hungary (1000–1301) =

Central European monarchy (1000–1301)

Kingdom of Hungary: Magyar Királyság (Hungarian); Regnum Hungariae (Latin)
- 1000–1301; Árpád dynasty
- Top: Royal standard of the 13th century Bottom: Dynastic standard of the 13th century Coat of arms of the 13th century

- The Kingdom of Hungary in personal union with Kingdom of Croatia (green) in 1190
- Status: In personal union with Croatia
- Capital: Esztergom (until 1256); Székesfehérvár (place of diets, royal seat, crowning and burial site); Buda (from 1256)
- Common languages: Latin (ceremonial, liturgical, administrative), Hungarian, Croatian, German, Slavic dialects, Cuman, Vlach
- Religion: Roman Catholicism (official); Eastern Orthodoxy; Tengrism (among Cumans (Note: The last pagan Cumans were definitely christianized in the 16th century, mostly by conversion to Protestantism.))
- Demonym: Hungarian
- Government: Feudal monarchy
- King
  - 1000–1038 (first): Stephen I
  - 1290–1301 (the last king of Árpáds): Andrew III
- Palatine
  - c. 1009–1038 (first): Samuel Aba
  - 1298–1299 (the last palatine of the Árpád reign): Roland Rátót
- Legislature: Parlamentum Generale (from 1290s)
- Historical era: Medieval
  - Established: 1000
  - Personal union with Croatia: 1102
  - Golden Bull: 1222
  - Diploma Andreanum: 1224
  - Resettlement of Cumans and Jasz people: 1238–1239
  - First Mongol invasion: 1241–1242
  - Second Mongol invasion: 1285–1286
  - Death of King Andrew III, the last member of the House of Árpád: 1301

Area
- 1200: 282,870 km^{2} (109,220 sq mi)

Population
  - 1200: 2,000,000
Preceded by
Principality of Hungary
Kingdom of Croatia
Principality of Nitra (disputed)
Succeeded by
Kingdom of Hungary after the Árpád dynasty
- Today part of: Austria; Croatia; Hungary; Poland; Romania; Serbia; Slovakia; Slovenia; Ukraine (Carpathian Ruthenia)

The high medieval Kingdom of Hungary was a regional power in Central Europe. It came into existence when Stephen I, Grand Prince of the Hungarians, was crowned king in 1000 or 1001. He reinforced central authority and forced his subjects to accept Christianity. Although all written sources emphasize only the role played by German and Italian knights and clerics in the process, a significant part of the Hungarian vocabulary for agriculture and religion was taken from Slavic languages. Civil wars and pagan uprisings, along with attempts by the Holy Roman emperors to expand their authority over Hungary, jeopardized the new monarchy. The monarchy stabilized during the reigns of Ladislaus I (1077–1095) and Coloman (1095–1116). These rulers occupied Croatia and Dalmatia with the support of a part of the local population. Both realms retained their autonomous position. The successors of Ladislaus and Coloman—especially Béla II (1131–1141), Béla III (1176–1196), Andrew II (1205–1235), and Béla IV (1235–1270)—continued this policy of expansion towards the Balkan Peninsula and the lands east of the Carpathian Mountains, transforming their kingdom into one of the major powers of medieval Europe.

Rich in uncultivated lands, silver, gold, and salt deposits, Hungary became the preferred destination of mainly German, Italian, and French colonists. These immigrants were mostly peasants who settled in villages, but some were craftsmen and merchants, who established most of the cities of the Kingdom. Their arrival played a key role in the shaping of an urban lifestyle, habits, and culture in medieval Hungary. The location of the kingdom at the crossroads of international trade routes favored the coexistence of several cultures. Romanesque, Gothic, and Renaissance buildings and literary works written in Latin prove the predominantly Roman Catholic character of the culture; but Orthodox, and even non-Christian ethnic minority communities also existed. Latin was the language of legislation, administration and the judiciary, but "linguistic pluralism" contributed to the survival of many tongues, including a great variety of Slavic dialects.

The predominance of royal estates initially assured the sovereign's preeminent position, but the alienation of royal lands gave rise to the emergence of a self-conscious group of lesser landholders, known as "royal servants". They forced Andrew II to issue his Golden Bull of 1222, "one of the first examples of constitutional limits being placed on the powers of a European monarch" (Francis Fukuyama). The kingdom received a major blow from the Mongol invasion of 1241–42. Thereafter, Cuman and Jassic groups settled in the central lowlands, and colonists arrived from Moravia, Poland, and other nearby countries. The erection of fortresses by landlords, promoted by the monarchs after the withdrawal of the Mongols, led to the development of semi-autonomous "provinces" dominated by powerful magnates. Some of these magnates even challenged the authority of Andrew III (1290–1301), the last male descendant of the native Árpád dynasty. His death was followed by a period of interregnum and anarchy. Central power was re-established only in the early 1320s.

== Background ==
The Magyars, or Hungarians, conquered the Carpathian Basin at the turn of the 9th and 10th centuries. Here they found a predominantly Slavic-speaking population. From their new homeland, they launched plundering raids against East Francia, Italy, and other regions of Europe. Their raids were halted by the future Holy Roman Emperor Otto I, who defeated them at the Battle of Lechfeld in 955.

Hungarians lived in patrilineal families, which were organized into clans that formed tribes. The tribal confederation was headed by the grand prince, always a member of the family descending from Árpád, the Hungarians' leader around the time of their "land-taking". Contemporary authors described the Hungarians as nomads, but Ibn Rusta and others added that they also cultivated arable land. The great number of borrowings from Slavic languages (Note: For example, cseresznye ("cherry"), iga ("yoke"), kovács ("blacksmith"), ablak ("window"), patkó ("horseshoe"), and bálvány ("idol") were borrowed from Slavic.) prove that the Hungarians adopted new techniques and a more settled lifestyle in Central Europe. The cohabitation of Hungarians and local ethnic groups is also reflected in the assemblages of the "Bijelo Brdo culture", which emerged in the mid-10th century. Archaeological finds—a few objects with short inscriptions—indicate the use of a special runiform script in medieval Hungary. The inscriptions have not been deciphered, and the script was probably never used for administrative or legislative purposes.

Although they were pagan, the Hungarians demonstrated a tolerant attitude towards Christians, Jews, and Muslims. Muslim, Jewish, and Hungarian merchants from Hungary regularly visited the fairs at Prague, exchanging gold and Byzantine gold coins for slaves, tin, and fur. To Pereyaslavets, an important emporium on the Lower Danube, the Hungarians brought horses and silver. The Byzantine Church was the first to successfully proselytize among their leaders: in 948 the horka, and around 952 the gyula, were baptized in Constantinople. In contrast, the grand prince Géza who ruled from the early 970s received baptism into the Latin Church. He erected fortresses and invited foreign warriors to develop a new army based on heavy cavalry. Géza also arranged the marriage of his son, Stephen, with Giselle of Bavaria, a princess from the family of the Holy Roman emperors.

When Géza died in 997, his son had to fight for his succession with Koppány, the eldest member of the House of Árpád. Assisted by German heavy cavalry, Stephen emerged the victor in the decisive battle of the conflict in 998. He applied for a royal crown to Pope Sylvester II (r. 999–1003), who granted his request with the consent of Emperor Otto III.

== "Patrimonial" kingdom ==
=== King St Stephen (1000–1038) ===
Stephen was crowned the first king of Hungary on either 25 December 1000, or 1 January 1001. He consolidated his rule through a series of wars against semi-independent local rulers, including his maternal uncle, Gyula, and the powerful tribal chief, Ajtony. He proved his kingdom's military strength when he repelled an invasion by Conrad II, Holy Roman Emperor, in 1030. Marshlands, other natural obstacles, and barricades made of stone, earth, or timber provided defense at the kingdom's borders. A wide zone known as gyepü was intentionally left uninhabited for defensive purposes along the frontiers.

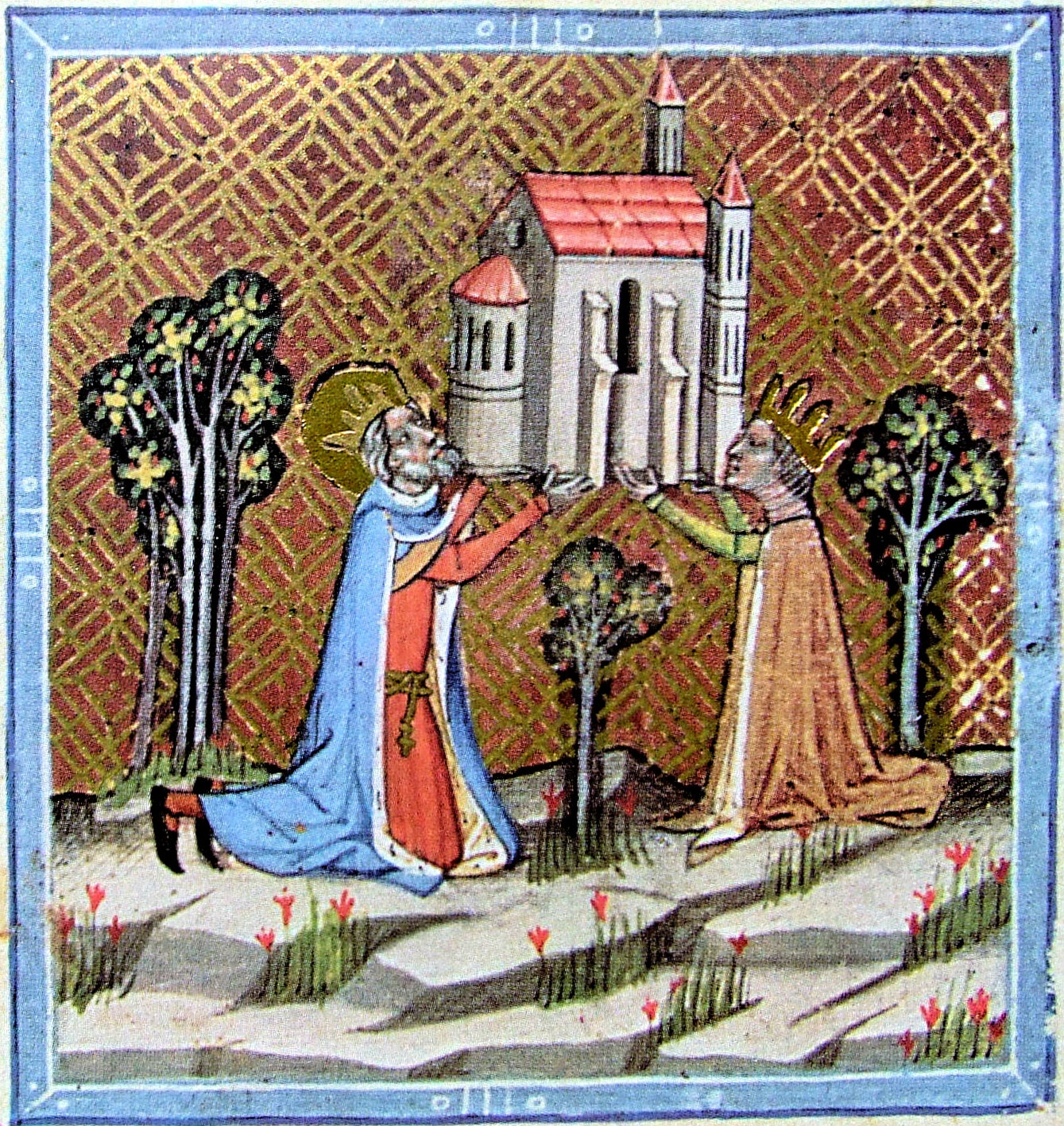
King St Stephen and his wife founding a church at Óbuda

Stephen developed a state similar to the monarchies of contemporary Western Europe. Counties, the basic units of administration, were districts organized around fortresses and headed by royal officials known as ispáns, or counts. Most of the early medieval fortresses were made of earth and timber. Stephen founded dioceses and at least one archbishopric, and established Benedictine monasteries. He prescribed that every tenth village was to build a parish church. The earliest churches were simple wood constructions, but the royal basilica at Székesfehérvár was built in Romanesque style. With the introduction of the Catholic church hierarchy, Latin emerged as the dominant language of ecclesiastic life and state administration, although some royal charters were likely written in Greek. (Note: The extant copy of the foundation charter of the convent of nuns at Veszprémvölgy was written in Greek.) The bishops were required to supply the local clergy with liturgical books, and the kings regularly donated codices to monasteries. The earliest extant literary works were composed in Latin during Stephen's reign. Bishop Gerard of Csanád, who had come from Venice, completed a Latin commentary on a chapter in the Book of Daniel in Hungary. Stephen's views on state administration were summarized around 1015 in a mirror for princes known as Admonitions. Stating that "the country that has only one language and one custom is weak and fragile", he emphasized the advantages of the arrival of foreigners, or "guests". His laws were aimed at the adoption, even by force, of a Christian way of life. He especially protected Christian marriage against polygamy and other traditional customs. Decorated belts and other items of pagan fashion also disappeared. Commoners started to wear long woolen coats, but wealthy men persisted in wearing their silk kaftans decorated with furs.

King Stephen's Decree on the Abduction of Girls

If any warrior debased by lewdness abducts a girl to be his wife without the consent of her parents, we decreed that the girl should be returned to her parents, even if he did anything by force to her, and the abductor shall pay ten steers for the abduction, although he may afterwards have made peace with the girl's parents.

— Stephen I:27, 1000–1038

From a legal perspective, Hungarian society was divided into freemen and serfs, but intermediate groups also existed. All freemen had the legal capacity to own property, to sue, and to be sued. Most of them were bound to the monarch or to a wealthier landlord, and only "guests" could freely move. Among freemen living in lands attached to a fortress, the castle warriors served in the army, and the castle folk cultivated the lands, forged weapons, or rendered other services. All freemen were to pay a special tax, the freemen's pennies—eight denars per person per year—to the monarchs. Peasants known as udvornici were exempt from this tax, being somewhat transitory between the status of freemen and of serf. Serfs theoretically lacked the legal status available to freemen, but in practice they had their own property: they cultivated their masters' land with their own tools, and kept 50–66 percent of the harvest for themselves. Stephen's laws and charters suggest that most commoners lived in sedentary communities which formed villages. An average village was made up of no more than 40 semi-sunken timber huts with a corner hearth. The huts were surrounded by large courtyards. Ditches separated them, keeping the animals away and enabling the growing of grains and vegetables. Many of the villages were named after a profession, (Note: Examples include Födémes ("beekeeper"), Hodász ("beaver hunter"), Gerencsér ("potter"), and Taszár ("carpenter")) implying that the villagers were required to render a specific service to their lords.

=== Pagan revolts, wars, and consolidation (1038–1116) ===
Stephen I outlived his son, Emeric, which caused a four-decade long crisis. Stephen considered his cousin, Vazul, unsuitable for the throne and named his own sister's son, the Venetian Peter Orseolo, as his heir. After Vazul was blinded and his three sons were expelled, Peter succeeded his uncle without opposition in 1038. Peter's preference for his foreign courtiers led to a rebellion, which ended with his deposition in favor of a native lord, Samuel Aba, who was related to the royal family. Supported by Emperor Henry III, Peter returned and expelled Samuel in 1044. During his second rule, Peter accepted the emperor's suzerainty. His rule ended with a new rebellion, this time aimed at the restoration of paganism. There were many lords who opposed the destruction of the Christian monarchy. They proposed the crown to Andrew, one of Vazul's sons, who returned to Hungary, defeated Peter and suppressed the pagans in 1046. His cooperation with his brother, Béla, a talented military commander, ensured the Hungarians' victory over Emperor Henry III, who attempted to conquer the kingdom two times: in 1050 and 1053.

A new civil war broke out when Duke Béla claimed the crown for himself in 1059, but his three sons accepted the rule of Solomon, Andrew I's son, in 1063. Bishop Maurus of Pécs wrote his Life of the hermits Benedict and Andrew Zorard—the earliest Hungarian hagiography—around this time. The young king and his cousins cooperated for almost a decade; for instance, they jointly defeated the Pechenegs plundering Transylvania in 1068. The power conflict in the royal family caused a new civil war in 1071. It lasted up to Solomon's abdication in favor of one of his cousins, Ladislaus, in the early 1080s. Ladislaus promulgated laws that prescribed draconian punishments against criminals. His laws also regulated the payment of customs duties, of tolls payable at fairs and fords, and of the tithes. He forbade Jews from holding Christian serfs, and introduced laws aiming at the conversion of local Muslims, who were known as Böszörménys.

King Ladislaus' Decree on Merchants and Traders Buying Stolen Goods

No one shall buy or sell except in the market. If, in violation of this anyone buys stolen property, everyone shall perish: the buyer, the seller, and the witnesses. If, however, they agreed to sell something of their own, they shall lose that thing and its price, and the witnesses shall lose as much too. But if the deal was made in the market, and agreement shall be concluded in front of a judge, a toll-gatherer, and witnesses, and if the purchased goods later appear to be stolen, the buyer shall escape penalty ...

— Ladislaus II:7, 1077–1095

The death of Ladislaus's brother-in-law King Zvonimir of Croatia, in 1089 or 1090, created an opportunity for him to claim Croatia for himself. Ladislaus's sister, Helena, and several noblemen (mainly from northern Croatia) supported his claim. Ladislaus's troops occupied the lowlands, but a native claimant, Petar Snačić, resisted in the Petrova Mounts. Nevertheless, Croatia and Hungary remained closely connected for more than nine centuries. Ladislaus I appointed his nephew, Álmos, to administer Croatia. Although a younger son, Álmos was also favored by the king against his brother, Coloman, for the succession. Even so, Coloman succeeded his uncle in 1095, while Álmos received a separate duchy under his brother's suzerainty. Throughout Coloman's reign, the brothers' relationship remained tense, which finally led to the blinding of Álmos and his infant son Béla.

Coloman routed two bands of crusaders (the perpetrators of the Rhineland massacres) who were plundering the Western borderlands, and defeated Petar Snačić in Croatia. The late 14th-century Pacta conventa states that Coloman was crowned king of Croatia after concluding an agreement with twelve local noblemen. Although most probably a forgery, the document reflects the actual status of Croatia proper, which was never incorporated into Hungary. In contrast, the region known as Slavonia, between the Petrova Mounts and the river Dráva, became closely connected to Hungary. Here many Hungarian noblemen received land grants from the monarchs. Zadar, Split, and other Dalmatian towns also accepted Coloman's suzerainty in 1105, but their right to elect their own bishops and leaders remained unchanged. In Croatia and Slavonia, the sovereign was represented by governors bearing the title ban. Likewise, a royal official, the voivode, administered Transylvania, the eastern borderland of the kingdom. The central administration's highest offices developed from the royal household's leading positions. Initially responsible for the management of the royal domains, the palatine emerged as the king's deputy by the early 12th century. His managerial tasks were transferred to a new official who quickly gained the functions of a chief justiciar as judge royal.

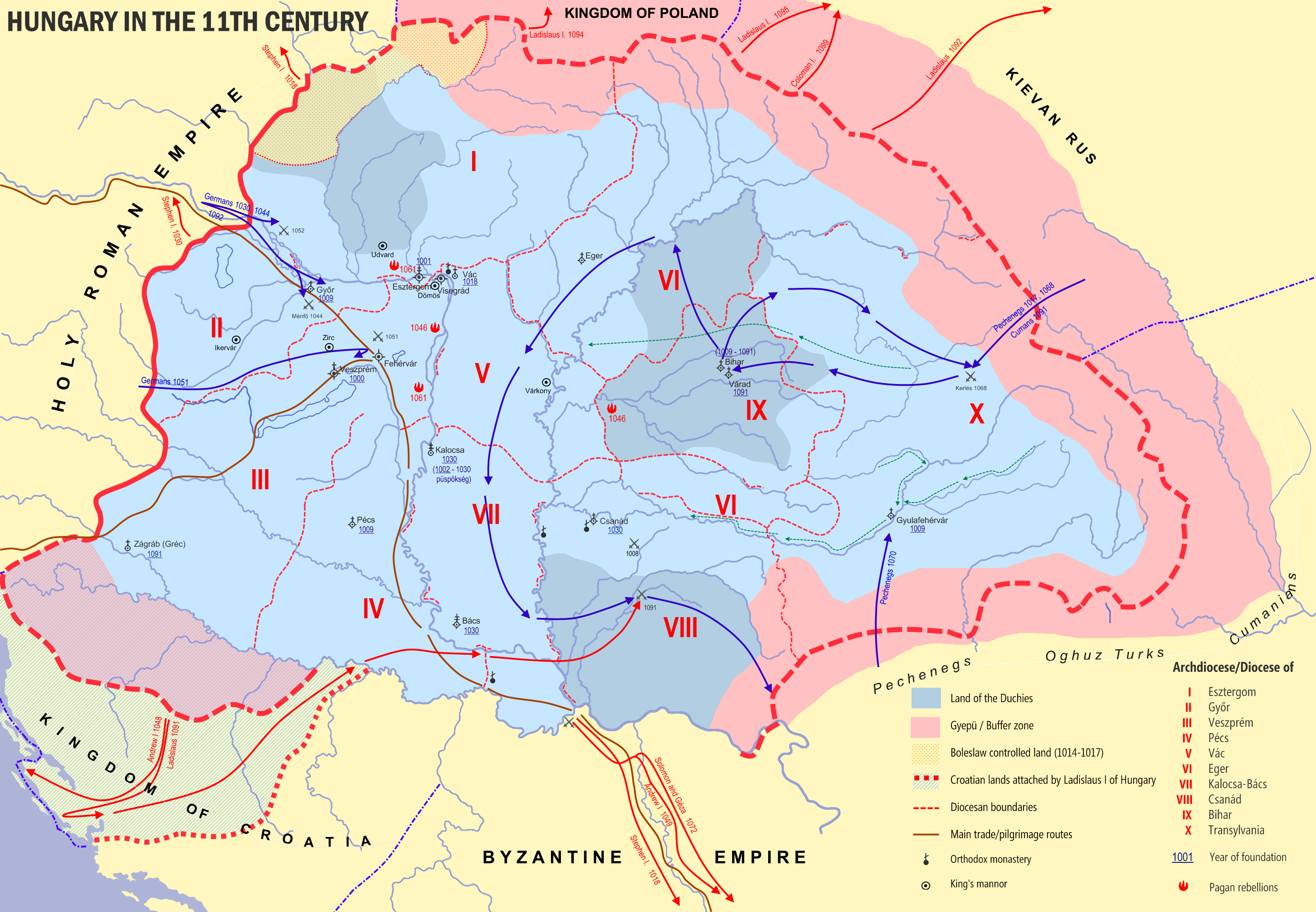
The Kingdom of Hungary in the 1090s

Like Ladislaus I, Coloman proved to be a great legislator, but he prescribed less severe punishments than his uncle had done. He ordered that transactions between Christians and Jews were to be put into writing. He prohibited them to hold Christian slaves and introduced a ban on sale of native slaves to places abroad. His laws concerning his Muslim subjects aimed at their conversion; for instance, by obliging them to marry their daughters to Christians. The presence of Jewish and Muslim merchants in the kingdom was due to its position as a crossroad of trading routes leading towards Constantinople, Regensburg, and Kiev. Local trade also existed, which enabled Coloman to collect the marturina, the traditional in-kind tax of Slavonia, in cash. Coloman exempted those who lived on their own estates from the freemen's pennies, and allowed other freemen to redeem half of the tax through services provided. Modern scholars assume that the earliest Hungarian chronicle was composed under Coloman, but it did not survive. This "primary" chronicle is thought to have been expanded and rewritten in accordance with changing political expectations during the 12th century. All scholarly attempts to reconstruct the original text based on chronicles from the 14th and 15th centuries have proved futile.

The kingdom was sparsely populated, with an average population density of four or five people per 1 square kilometre (0.39 sq mi). The Olaszi ("Italians") streets or districts in Eger, Pécs and Várad (Oradea, Romania) point at the presence of "guests" speaking a Western Romance language, (Note: Olasz is the modern Hungarian word for Italians, but in the Middle Ages the term also covered other peoples speaking a Romance language.) while the Németi ("Germans") and Szászi ("Saxons") place names imply German-speaking colonists throughout the entire kingdom. Most subjects of the early medieval Hungarian monarchs were peasants. They only cultivated the most fertile lands, and moved further out when the lands became exhausted. Wheat was the most widely produced crop, but barley, the raw material for home brew, was also grown. Winegrowing flourished and vineyards existed in virtually all settlements with the exception of the highlands. The highest-ranking wines were produced in the Szerémség region (now Srem in Serbia), but the wines of Buda Hills, Hegyalja, Sopron, and Pressburg (Bratislava, Slovakia) were also popular. Fresh or dried fruits were common elements of the peasants' daily diet. Monasteries introduced the systematic growing of fruit trees. In their orchards, the trees were planted in holes dug at regular intervals. Even peasants were allowed to hunt and fish in the royal forests that covered large territories in the kingdom. Animal husbandry remained an important sector of agriculture, and millet and oats were produced for fodder. Both written sources and archaeological evidence indicate that famine was an exceptional phenomenon in medieval Hungary.

=== Expansion and colonization (1116–1196) ===
Unsuccessful wars with the Republic of Venice, the Byzantine Empire, and other neighboring states characterized the reign of Coloman's son, Stephen II, who succeeded his father in 1116. The earliest mention of the Székelys—a Hungarian-speaking community of free warriors—is in connection with the young king's first war against the Duchy of Bohemia. The Székelys lived in scattered groups along the borders, but they were moved to the easternmost regions of Transylvania in the 12th century. Stephen II died childless in 1131. His cousin, Duke Álmos' blind son Béla II, succeeded him. During his reign, the kingdom was administered by his wife, Helena of Serbia, who ordered the massacre of the lords whom she blamed for her husband's mutilation. Boris Kalamanos, an alleged son of King Coloman who attempted to seize the throne from Béla II, received no internal support.

Otto of Freising on King Géza II's Authority

If anyone of the rank of count has even in a trivial matter offended against the king or, as sometimes happens, has been unjustly accused of this, an emissary from the court, though he be of very lowly station and unattended, seizes him in the midst of his retinue, puts him in chains, and drags him off to various forms of punishment. No formal sentence is asked of the prince through his peers, ... no opportunity of defending himself is granted the accused, but the will of the prince alone is held by all as sufficient.

— Otto of Freising, The Deeds of Frederick Barbarossa

Béla II's son, Géza II, who ascended the throne in 1141, adopted an active foreign policy. He supported Uroš II of Serbia against Emperor Manuel I Komnenos, and launched at least six military campaigns to the Kievan Rus' against the enemies of his brother-in-law Iziaslav II of Kiev. He even recruited Muslim warriors in the Pontic steppes to serve in his army. Abu Hamid al-Gharnati, a Muslim traveler from Al-Andalus who lived in Hungary from 1150 to 1153 stated that Géza was "many times more powerful than that of the Byzantine ruler" as his troops were "innumerable". He overestimated Géza's military power but the Hungarian army was indeed on a par with the armies of the Byzantine and Holy Roman emperors. While crossing Hungary during the Second Crusade, Otto of Freising noticed Géza's nearly uncontrolled authority over his subjects.

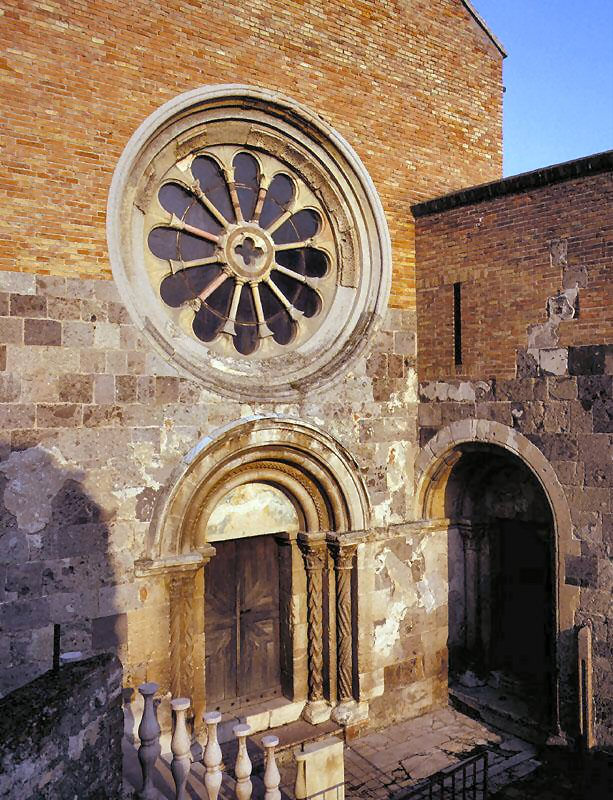
Rose window on the Gothic chapel in the Royal Castle at Esztergom (late 12th century)

Géza promoted the colonization of the border zones. Flemish, German, Italian, and Walloon "guests" arrived in great numbers and settled in the Szepesség region (Spiš, Slovakia) and in southern Transylvania. Abu Hamid refers to mountains that "contain lots of silver and gold", which points at the importance of mining and gold panning already around 1150. He also writes of slave trading, mentioning that he bought an attractive slave girl for ten denars, but beautiful slave women were sold for three denars after military campaigns. Archaeological evidence indicates that the large asymmetric heavy plows, capable to turn the soil over, first appeared when the new settlers arrived. As the heavy plows spread, long narrow fields, more suitable to their use, replaced the traditional small square fields in the villages.

Géza was succeeded in 1162 by his eldest son, Stephen III. His uncles, Ladislaus II and Stephen IV, claimed the crown for themselves. Emperor Manuel I Komnenos took advantage of the internal conflicts and forced the young king to cede Dalmatia and the Szerémség to the Byzantines in 1165. Stephen III set an example for the development of towns by granting liberties to the Walloon "guests" in Székesfehérvár, including immunity from the jurisdiction of the local ispán. When Stephen died childless in 1172, his brother, Béla III, ascended the throne. He reconquered Dalmatia and the Szerémség in the 1180s.

A contemporary list shows that Béla's total income was the equivalent of 32 tonnes of silver per year, but this number is clearly exaggerated. According to the list, more than 50 percent of his revenues derived from the annual renewal of the silver currency, and from trade-related duties. Austrian custom tariffs of the period indicate that Hungary was a major supplier of grain, leather, timber, wine, wax, honey, fish, cattle, sheep, pigs, copper, tin, lead, iron, and salt. Royal revenues were due either to the royal chamber or to the king as landowner. The distinction between them was of fundamental importance because the ispáns received one third of the chamber revenues collected in their counties. In-kind taxes were typically imposed on vineyards, and herds of pigs or oxen. Some privileged communities paid lump sum taxes to the royal chamber. Examples include the foreign settlers in Transylvania, who were to pay 15,000 marks per year.

Béla emphasized the importance of making records on judicial proceedings, which substantiates reports in later Hungarian chronicles of his order regarding the obligatory use of written petitions. Landowners also started to put their transactions into writing, which led to the appearance of the so-called "places of authentication", such as cathedral chapters and monasteries authorized to issue deeds. Their emergence also evidences the employment of an educated staff. Indeed, students from the kingdom studied at the universities of Paris, Oxford, Bologna, and Padua from the 1150s. Aspects of 12th-century French culture could also be detected in Béla's kingdom. His palace at Esztergom was built in the early Gothic style. Achilles and other names known from the Legend of Troy and the Romance of Alexander (two emblematic works of chivalric culture) were also popular among Hungarian aristocrats. According to the consensual scholarly view, "Master P", the author of the Gesta Hungarorum, a chronicle on the Hungarian "land-taking", was Béla's notary. The earliest text written in Hungarian, known as Funeral Sermon and Prayer, was preserved in the late 12th-century Pray Codex.

== Development of the Estates of the realm ==
=== Age of Golden Bulls (1196–1241) ===
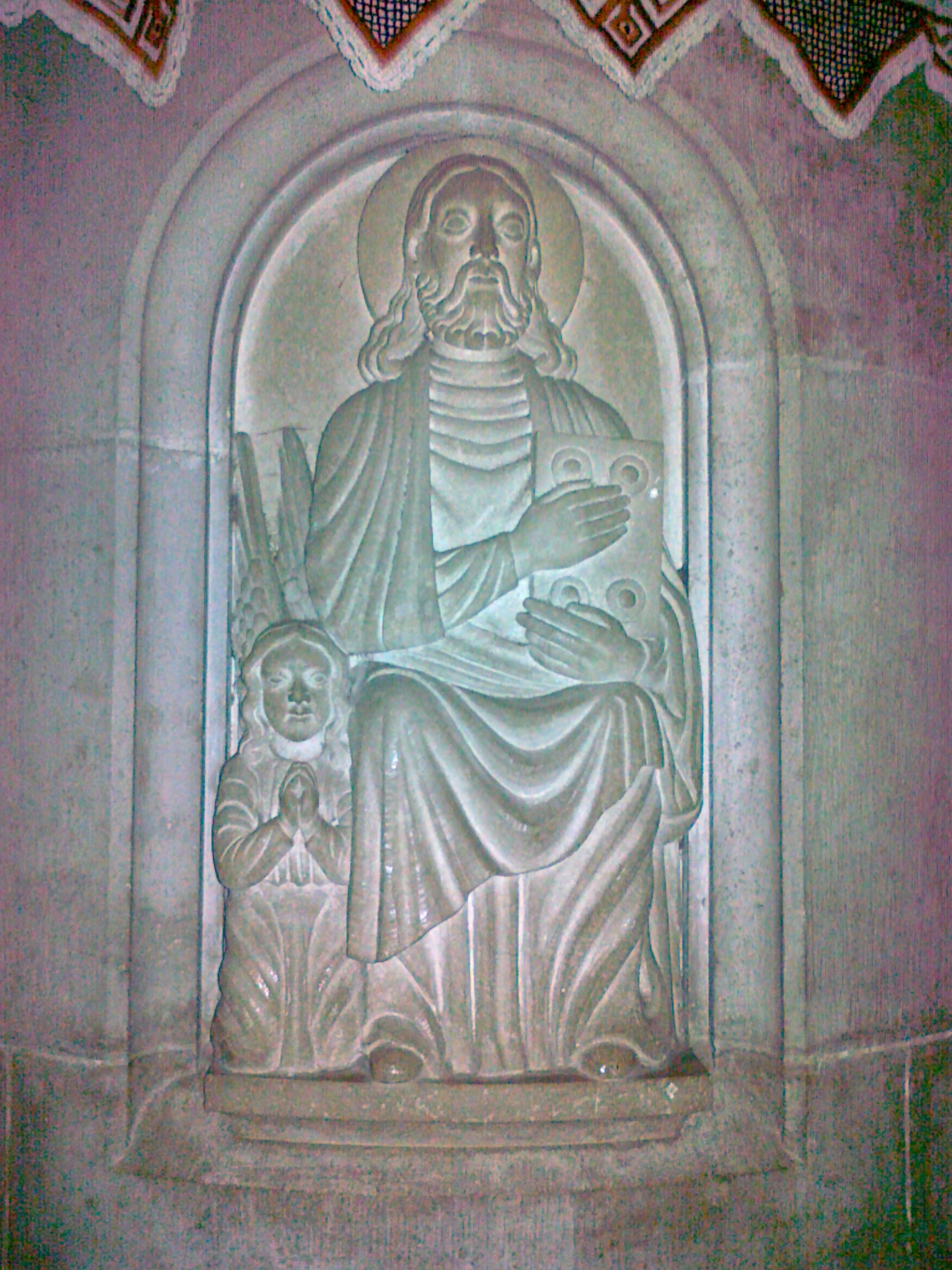
Relief of Matthew the Apostle from the Romanesque church of Ják (13th century)

Béla III's son and successor, Emeric, had to face revolts stirred up by his younger brother, Andrew. Furthermore, incited by Enrico Dandolo, Doge of Venice, the armies of the Fourth Crusade took Zadar in 1202. Emeric was succeeded in 1204 by his infant son, Ladislaus III. When the young king died in a year, his uncle, Andrew, mounted the throne. Stating that "the best measure of a royal grant is its being immeasurable", he distributed large parcels of royal lands among his partisans. Freemen living in former royal lands lost their direct contact to the sovereign, which threatened their legal status. Royal revenues decreased, which led to the introduction of new taxes and their farming out to Muslims and Jews. The new methods of raising funds for the royal treasury created widespread unrest.

Andrew II was strongly influenced by his wife, Gertrude of Merania. She openly expressed her preference for her German compatriots, which led to her assassination by a group of local lords in 1213. A new uprising broke out while the king was in the Holy Land on his crusade in 1217 and 1218. Finally, a movement of the royal servants, who were actually free landholders directly subordinated to the sovereign, obliged Andrew II to issue his Golden Bull in 1222. It summarized the royal servants' liberties, including their tax exemption. Its last provision authorized the secular and spiritual lords to "resist and speak against" the sovereign "without the charge of high treason". Around this time, the structure of charters of grant underwent a significant change with the introduction of a narrative section about the beneficiaries' heroic acts in the king's service. These lengthy accounts contain more information about Hungary's 13th-century history than the chronicles.

The Golden Bull also prohibited the employment of Muslims and Jews in royal administration. This ban was confirmed when Andrew II, urged by the prelates, issued the Golden Bull's new variant in 1231, which authorized the archbishop of Esztergom to excommunicate him in case of his departure from its provisions. For non-Christians who continued to be employed in the royal household, Archbishop Robert of Esztergom placed the kingdom under interdict in 1232. Andrew II was forced to take an oath, which included his promise to respect the privileged position of clergymen and to dismiss all his Jewish and Muslim officials. A growing intolerance against non-Catholics is also demonstrated by the transfer of the Orthodox monastery of Visegrád to the Benedictines in 1221.

Andrew II made several attempts to occupy the neighboring Principality of Halych. His son, Béla, persuaded a group of Cumans to accept Andrew II's suzerainty in 1228 and established a new march in Oltenia (known as the Banate of Szörény) in 1231. Béla IV succeeded his father in 1235. His attempt to reacquire crown lands alienated by his predecessors created a deep rift between the monarch and the lords just as the Mongols were sweeping westward across the Eurasian steppes. The king was first informed of the Mongol threat by Friar Julian, a Dominican friar who had visited a Hungarian-speaking population in Magna Hungaria, in 1235. In the next years, the Mongols routed the Cumans who dominated the western parts of the Eurasian steppes. A Cuman chieftain, Kuthen, agreed to accept Béla IV's supremacy; thus he and his people were allowed to settle in the Great Hungarian Plain. The Cumans' nomadic lifestyle caused many conflicts with local communities. The locals even considered them as the Mongols' allies.

=== Mongol invasion (1241–1242) ===
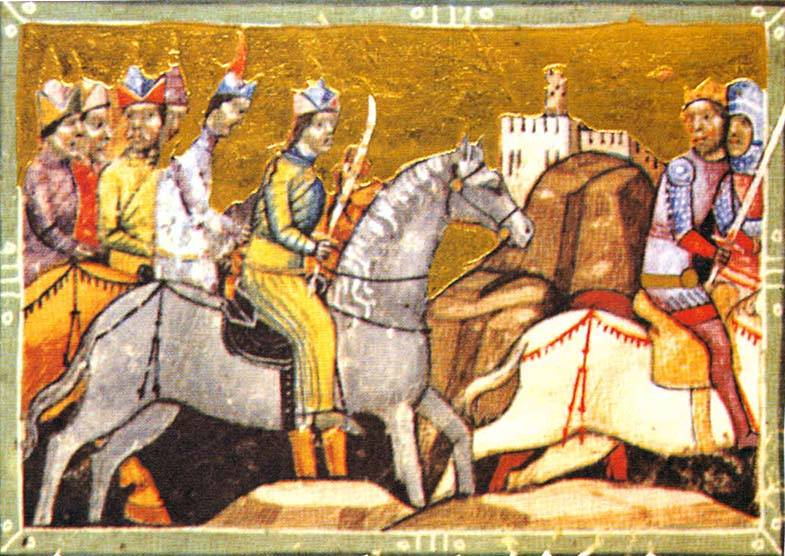
Mongols chasing King Béla IV after the Battle of Mohi

Batu Khan, who was the commander of the Mongol armies invading Eastern Europe, demanded Béla IV's surrender without a fight in 1240. The king refused, and ordered his barons to assemble with their retinue in his camp at Pest. Here, a riot broke out against the Cumans and the mob massacred the Cuman leader, Kuthen. The Cumans soon departed and pillaged the central parts of the kingdom. The main Mongol army arrived through the northeastern passes of the Carpathian Mountains in March 1241. Royal troops met the enemy forces at the river Sajó, where the Mongols won a decisive victory in the battle of Mohi on 11 April 1241. From the battlefield, Béla IV fled first to Austria, where Duke Frederick II held him for ransom. Thereafter, the king and his family found refuge in Klis Fortress in Dalmatia. The Mongols first occupied and thoroughly plundered the territories east of the river Danube. An eyewitness account of the devastation of eastern Hungary was compiled by Master Roger, archdeacon of the cathedral chapter at Várad. The Mongols crossed the Danube when it was frozen in early 1242. On learning of their acts, Hermann, abbot of the Austrian Niederaltaich Abbey recorded that "the Kingdom of Hungary, which had existed for 350 years, was destroyed".

Master Roger on the Destruction of Várad by the Mongols

[The Mongols] burnt the church [in Várad], together with the women and whatever there was in the church. In other churches they perpetrated such crimes to the women that it is better to keep silent ... Then they ruthlessly beheaded the nobles, citizens, soldiers and canons on a field outside the city. ... After they had destroyed everything, and an intolerable stench arose from the corpses, they left the place empty. People hiding in the nearby forests came back to find some food. And while they were searching among the stones and the corpses, the [Mongols] suddenly returned and of those living whom they found there, none was left alive.

— Master Roger, Epistle

The kingdom continued to exist. Batu Khan withdrew his entire army when he was informed of the death of the Great Khan Ögödei in March 1242. Nevertheless, the invasion and the famine that followed it had catastrophic demographic consequences. At least 15 percent of the population died or disappeared. Transcontinental trading routes disintegrated, causing the decline of Bács (Bač, Serbia), Ungvár (Uzhhorod, Ukraine) and other traditional centers of commerce. Local Muslim communities vanished, indicating they had suffered especially heavy losses during the invasion. Small villages also disappeared, but archaeological data indicate that the total destruction of settlements was less often than it used to be assumed. The abandonment of most villages, well-documented from the second half of the 13th century, was the consequence of a decades-long integration process with peasants moving from the small villages to larger settlements.

=== Last Árpáds (1242–1301) ===
After the Mongol withdrawal, Béla IV abandoned his policy of recovering former crown lands. Instead, he granted large estates to his supporters, and urged them to construct stone-and-mortar castles. He initiated a new wave of colonization that resulted in the arrival of a number of Germans, Moravians, Poles, and Romanians. The king re-invited the Cumans and settled them in the plains along the Danube and the Tisza. A group of Alans, the ancestors of the Jassic people, seems to have settled in the kingdom around the same time.

New villages appeared, consisting of timber houses built side by side in equal parcels of land. For instance, the scarcely-inhabited forests of the Western Carpathians (in present-day Slovakia) developed a network of settlements under Béla IV. Huts disappeared, and new rural houses consisting of a living room, a kitchen and a pantry were built. The most advanced agricultural techniques, including asymmetric heavy ploughs, also spread throughout the kingdom. Internal migration was likewise instrumental in the development of the new domains emerging in former royal lands. The new landholders granted personal freedom and more favorable financial conditions to those who arrived in their estates, which also enabled the peasants who decided not to move to improve their position. Béla IV granted privileges to more than a dozen towns, including Nagyszombat (Trnava, Slovakia) and Pest. A 1264 list of luxury goods—oriental velvet, silk, jewels, gems, and Flemish broadcloth—sold to Béla IV's heir Stephen indicates that imported goods were primarily paid for using silver and salt. Likewise, a list of merchandise brought to Ghent shows that Hungary exported wax and unminted gold and silver.

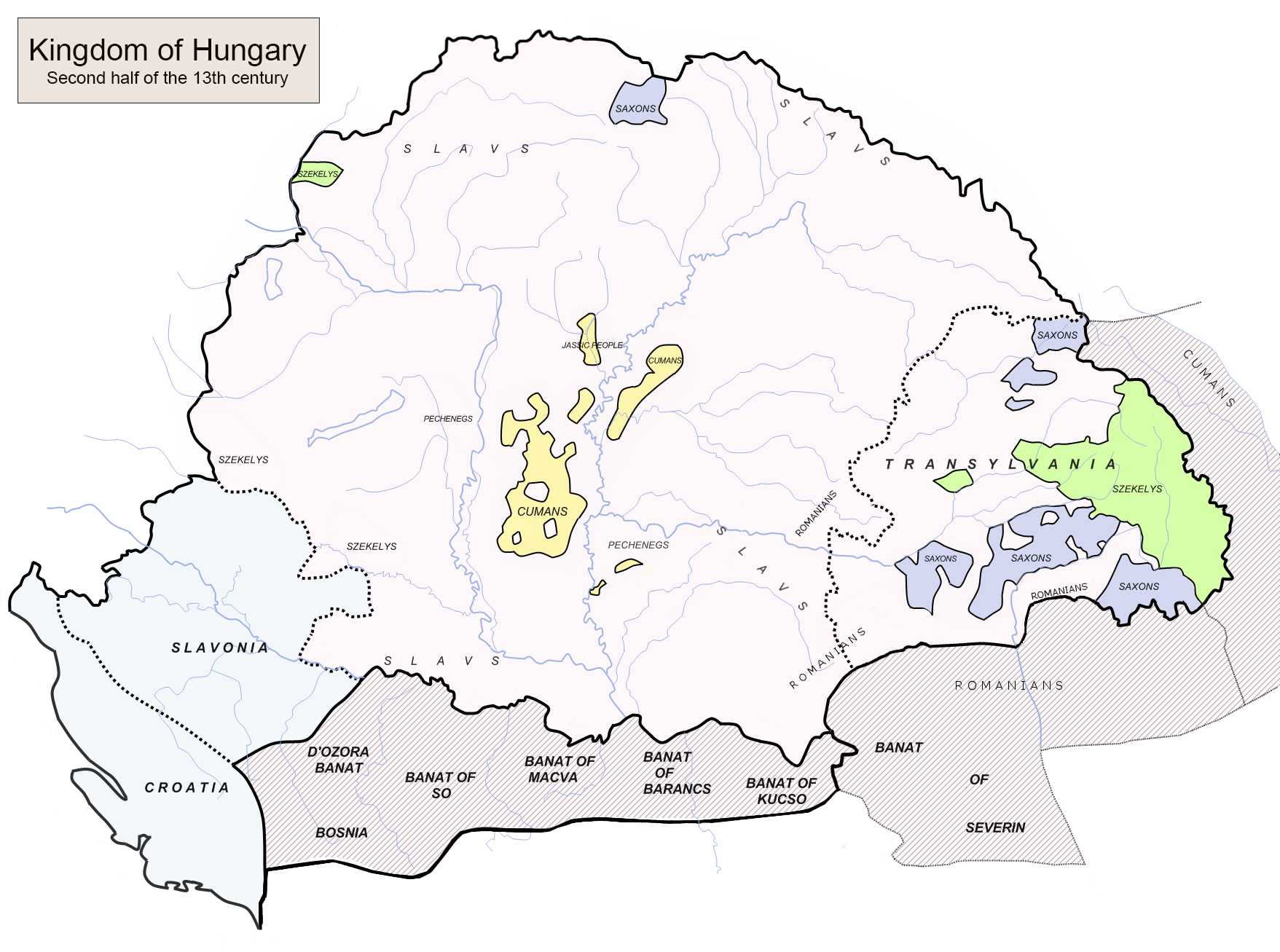
Local autonomies in the Kingdom of Hungary (late 13th century)

Although threatening letters sent to Béla IV by the khans of the Golden Horde proved that the danger of a new Mongol invasion still existed, he adopted an expansionist foreign policy. Frederick II of Austria died fighting against Hungarian troops in 1246, and Béla IV's son-in-law, Rostislav Mikhailovich, annexed large territories along the kingdom's southern frontiers. Conflicts between the elderly monarch and his heir caused a civil war in the 1260s.

Béla IV and his son jointly confirmed the liberties of the royal servants and started referring to them as noblemen in 1267. By that time, "true noblemen" were legally differentiated from other landholders. They held their estates free from any obligation, but everybody else (even the ecclesiastic nobles, Romanian knezes, and other "conditional nobles") owed services to their lords in exchange for the lands they held. In a growing number of counties, local nobility acquired the right to elect four "judges of the nobles" to represent them in official procedures (or two, in Transylvania and Slavonia). The idea of equating the Hungarian "nation" with the community of noblemen also emerged in this period. It was first expressed in Simon of Kéza's Gesta Hungarorum, a chronicle written in the 1280s.

The wealthiest landholders forced the lesser nobles to join their retinue, which increased their power. One of the barons, Joachim of the Gutkeled clan, even captured Stephen V's heir, the infant Ladislaus, in 1272. Stephen V died some months later, causing a new civil war between the Csák, Kőszegi, and other leading families who attempted to control the central government in the name of the young Ladislaus IV. He was declared to be of age in 1277 at an assembly of the spiritual and temporal lords and of the noblemen's and Cumans' representatives, but he could not strengthen royal authority. Ladislaus IV, whose mother, Elisabeth, was a Cuman chieftain's daughter, preferred his Cuman kin, which made him unpopular. He was even accused of initiating a second Mongol invasion in 1285, although the invaders were routed by the royal troops.

When Ladislaus IV was murdered in 1290, the Holy See declared the kingdom a vacant fief. Although Rome granted the kingdom to his sister's son, Charles Martel, crown prince of the Kingdom of Naples, the majority of the Hungarian lords chose Andrew, the grandson of Andrew II and son of a prince of dubious legitimacy. Andrew became the first monarch to take an oath respecting the liberties of the Church and the nobility before his coronation. He regularly convoked the prelates, the lords, and the noblemen's representatives to assemblies known as Diets, which started to develop into a legislative body. By 1300, when the kingdom had disintegrated into autonomous provinces ruled by powerful noblemen (including Matthew Csák, Ladislaus Kán, and Amadeus Aba), the Croatian lord, Paul I Šubić of Bribir, dared to invite the late Charles Martel's son, the twelve-year-old Charles Robert, to Hungary. The young pretender was marching from Croatia towards Buda when Andrew III unexpectedly died on 14 January 1301.

== Aftermath ==
With Andrew III's death, the male line of the House of Árpád became extinct, and a period of anarchy began. Charles Robert was crowned king with a provisional crown, but most lords and bishops refused to yield to him because they regarded him as a symbol of the Holy See's attempts to control Hungary. They elected as king the twelve-year-old Wenceslaus of Bohemia, who was descended from Béla IV of Hungary in the female line. The young king could not consolidate his position because many lords, especially those who held domains in the southern region of the kingdom, continued to support Charles Robert. Wenceslaus left Hungary for Bohemia in mid-1304. After he inherited Bohemia in 1305, he abandoned his claim to Hungary in favor of Otto III, Duke of Bavaria.

Otto, who was a grandson of Béla IV of Hungary, was crowned king, but only the Kőszegis and the Transylvanian Saxons regarded him as the lawful monarch. He was captured in Transylvania by Ladislaus Kán, who forced him to leave Hungary. The majority of the lords and prelates elected Charles Robert king at a Diet on 10 October 1307. He was crowned king with the Holy Crown of Hungary in Székesfehérvár by the Archbishop of Esztergom, as required by customary law, on 27 August 1310. During the next decade, he launched a series of military campaigns against the oligarchs to restore royal authority. Charles Robert reunited the kingdom after the death of the most powerful lord, Matthew Csák, which enabled him to conquer Csák's large province in the northeast of Hungary in 1321.

== See also ==
- Banat in the Middle Ages
- List of Hungarian monarchs
- Bulgarian-Hungarian Wars

== Sources ==
=== Primary sources ===
- Anonymus, Notary of King Béla: The Deeds of the Hungarians (Edited, Translated and Annotated by Martyn Rady and László Veszprémy) (2010). In: Rady, Martyn; Veszprémy, László; Bak, János M. (2010); Anonymus and Master Roger; CEU Press; ISBN 978-963-9776-95-1.
- Master Roger's Epistle to the Sorrowful Lament upon the Destruction of the Kingdom of Hungary by the Tatars (Translated and Annotated by János M. Bak and Martyn Rady) (2010). In: Rady, Martyn; Veszprémy, László; Bak, János M. (2010); Anonymus and Master Roger; CEU Press; ISBN 978-963-9776-95-1.
- The Deeds of Frederick Barbarossa by Otto of Freising and his continuator, Rahewin (Translated and annotated with an introduction by Charles Christopher Mierow, with the collaboration of Richard Emery) (1953). Columbia University Press. ISBN 0-231-13419-3.
- The Laws of the Medieval Kingdom of Hungary, 1000–1301 (Translated and Edited by János M. Bak, György Bónis, James Ross Sweeney with an essay on previous editions by Andor Czizmadia, Second revised edition, In collaboration with Leslie S. Domonkos) (1999). Charles Schlacks, Jr. Publishers.

=== Secondary sources ===
- Bak, János M. (1993). ""Linguistic pluralism" in Medieval Hungary". In Meyer, Marc A. (ed.). The Culture of Christendom: Essays in Medieval History in Memory of Denis L. T. Bethel. The Hambledon Press. ISBN 1-85285-064-7.
- Bárány, Attila (2012). "The Expansion of the Kingdom of Hungary in the Middle Ages (1000–1490)". In Berend, Nóra (ed.). The Expansion of Central Europe in the Middle Ages. The Expansion of Latin Europe, 1000–1500. Vol. 5. Ashgate Variorum. pp. 333–380. ISBN 978-1-4094-2245-7.
- Berend, Nora (2001). At the Gate of Christendom: Jews, Muslims and 'Pagans' in Medieval Hungary, c. 1000–c. 1300. Cambridge University Press. ISBN 978-0-521-02720-5.
- Berend, Nora; Urbańczyk, Przemysław; Wiszewski, Przemysław (2013). Central Europe in the High Middle Ages: Bohemia, Hungary and Poland, c. 900-c. 1300. Cambridge Medieval Textbooks. Cambridge University Press. ISBN 978-0-521-78156-5.
- Curta, Florin (2006). Southeastern Europe in the Middle Ages, 500–1250. Cambridge Medieval Textbooks. Cambridge University Press. ISBN 978-0-521-89452-4.
- Curta, Florin (2019). Eastern Europe in the Middle Ages (500–1300), Volume I. BRILL's Companion to European History. Vol. 19. Leiden, NL: Brill Publishers. ISBN 978-90-04-41534-8.
- Engel, Pál (2001). Ayton, Andrew (ed.). The Realm of St Stephen: A History of Medieval Hungary, 895–1526. Translated by Tamás Pálosfalvi. I.B. Tauris. ISBN 1-86064-061-3.
- Fine, John V. A (1991). The Early Medieval Balkans: A Critical Survey from the Sixth to the Late Twelfth century. The University of Michigan Press. ISBN 0-472-08149-7.
- Fine, John V. A (1994). The Late Medieval Balkans: A Critical Survey from the Late Twelfth Century to the Ottoman Conquest. University of Michigan Press. ISBN 0-472-08260-4.
- Goldstein, Ivo (1999). Croatia: A History. Translated by Nikolina Jovanović. McGill-Queen's University Press. ISBN 978-0-7735-2017-2.
- Kirschbaum, Stanislav J. (1996). A History of Slovakia: The Struggle for Survival. Palgrave Macmillan. ISBN 1-4039-6929-9.
- Kontler, László (1999). Millennium in Central Europe: A History of Hungary. Atlantisz Publishing House. ISBN 963-9165-37-9.
- Laszlovszky, József; Kubinyi, András (2018). "Demographic issues in late medieval Hungary: population, ethnic groups, economic activity". In Laszlovszky, József; Nagy, Balázs; Szabó, Péter; Vadai, András (eds.). The Economy of Medieval Hungary. East Central and Eastern Europe in the Middle Ages, 450–1450. Brill Publishers. pp. 48–64. ISBN 978-90-04-31015-5.
- Laszlovszky, József (2018). "Agriculture in Medieval Hungary". In Laszlovszky, József; Nagy, Balázs; Szabó, Péter; Vadai, András (eds.). The Economy of Medieval Hungary. East Central and Eastern Europe in the Middle Ages, 450–1450. Brill Publishers. pp. 81–112. ISBN 978-90-04-31015-5.
- Makkai, László (1994). "The Hungarians' prehistory, their conquest of Hungary and their raids to the West to 955; The foundation of the Hungarian Christian state, 950–1196; Transformation into a Western-type state, 1196–1301". In Sugár, Peter F.; Hanák, Péter; Frank, Tibor (eds.). A History of Hungary. Indiana University Press. pp. 8–33. ISBN 0-253-20867-X.
- Molnár, Miklós (2001). A Concise History of Hungary. Cambridge Concise Histories. Translated by Anna Magyar. Cambridge University Press. ISBN 978-0-521-66736-4.
- Nagy, Balázs (2018). "Foreign Trade in Medieval Hungary". In Laszlovszky, József; Nagy, Balázs; Szabó, Péter; Vadai, András (eds.). The Economy of Medieval Hungary. East Central and Eastern Europe in the Middle Ages, 450–1450. Brill Publishers. pp. 473–490. ISBN 978-90-04-31015-5.
- Rady, Martyn (2000). Nobility, Land and Service in Medieval Hungary. Studies in Russia and East Europe. Palgrave. ISBN 0-333-80085-0.
- Sedlar, Jean W. (1994). East Central Europe in the Middle Ages, 1000–1500. A History of East Central Europe. Vol. III. University of Washington Press. ISBN 0-295-97290-4.
- Spiesz, Anton; Caplovic, Dusan; Bolchazy, Ladislaus J. (2006). Illustrated Slovak History: A Struggle for Sovereignty in Central Europe. Bolchazy-Carducci Publishers. ISBN 978-0-86516-426-0.
- Spinei, Victor (2003). The Great Migrations in the East and South East of Europe from the Ninth to the Thirteenth Century. Translated by Dana Badulescu. Romanian Cultural Institute (Center for Transylvanian Studies). ISBN 973-85894-5-2.
- Tanner, Marcus (2010). Croatia: A Nation Forged in War. Yale University Press. ISBN 978-0-300-16394-0.
- Weisz, Boglárka (2018). "Royal revenues in the Árpádian Age". In Laszlovszky, József; Nagy, Balázs; Szabó, Péter; Vadai, András (eds.). The Economy of Medieval Hungary. East Central and Eastern Europe in the Middle Ages, 450–1450. Brill Publishers. pp. 256–264. ISBN 978-90-04-31015-5.
- Zsoldos, Attila (2020). The Árpáds and Their People: An Introduction to the History of Hungary from cca. 900 to 1301. Arpadiana. Vol. IV. Research Centre for the Humanities. ISBN 978-963-416-226-1.
