= Mraconia =

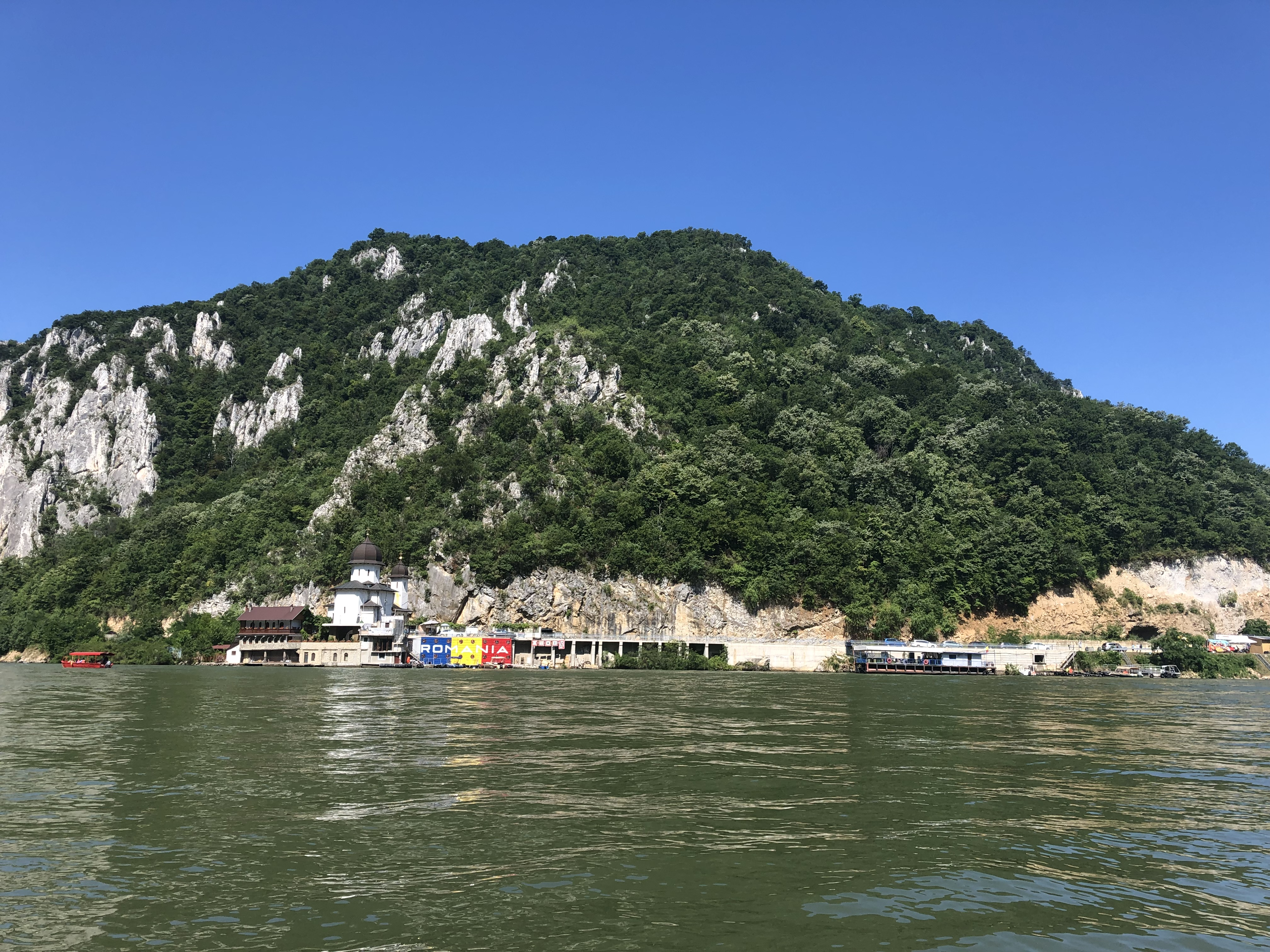
- Monastery Mraconia, on Mraconia and Danube rivers

- Location within Romania

Location
- Country: Romania
- Counties: Mehedinți County

Physical characteristics
- Mouth: Danube
  - coordinates: 44.6404°N 22.2937°E
- Length: 19 km (12 mi)
- Basin size: 113 km^{2} (44 sq mi)
- Discharge
  - location: Near mouth
  - average: 0.47 m^{3}/s (17 cu ft/s)

Basin features
- Progression: Danube→ Black Sea
- Tributaries
  - left: Radu, Neamț

The Mraconia is a small left tributary of the river Danube in Romania. It discharges into the Danube near Dubova. Its length is 19 km (12 mi) and its basin size is 113 km^{2} (44 sq mi).
