= Anjou Legendarium =

Manuscript related to House of Anjou of Hungary

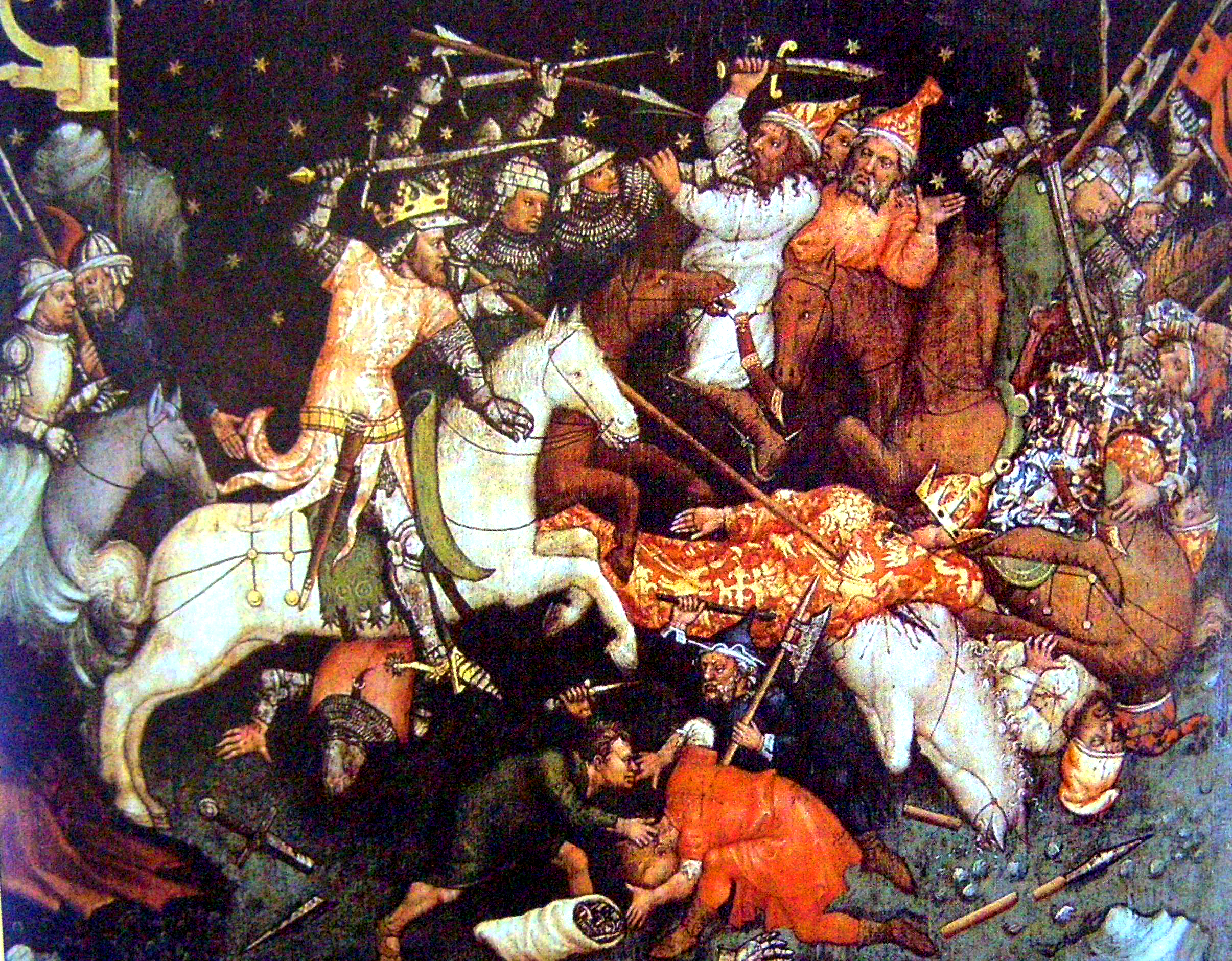
A battle scene from the Anjou Legendarium, showing the victory of Louis I of Hungary over the Ottomans in Bulgaria

The Anjou Legendarium is a Gothic illuminated manuscript of a collection of stories from the life of saints important to the House of Anjou of Hungary. The origins of the codex are unclear. It may have been made for Charles I of Hungary and his son Prince Andrew, or for James of Piacenza. Likewise, Csanád Telegdi, archbishop of Esztergom is a possible candidate.

The legendarium was a picture book intended for children with a brief text accompanying pictures. The painters of the work came from Bologna and painted in the style of the trecento.

Portions of the manuscript can be found in the Vatican Library, the Morgan Library and the Hermitage Museum. The medieval Legendarium of more than 140 pages contains images and scenes of the life of Jesus Christ, the Hungarian bishop Saint Gerard Sagredo, the prince Saint Emeric of Hungary, the King Saint Ladislaus I of Hungary, the Polish bishop Stanislaus of Szczepanów, Saint Francis of Assisi, Saint Martin, Saint George and of many other legendary Christians.

== See also ==
- Saint Ladislaus legend
