= Deliberatio supra hymnum trium puerorum =

The Deliberatio supra hymnum trium puerorum ("Contemplation on the Three Children's Hymn"), or shortly Deliberatio, is the only extant work of Bishop Gerard of Csanád (d. 1046). It is an important source of the history of the Christianization of Hungary in the early 11th century.

== Manuscript ==
The entire work has been preserved in a late-11th-century manuscript written in Carolingian minuscule. A note at the top of one of its leaves indicates that it was held at the library of the Catholic Diocese of Freising in the 12th century.

== Bishop Gerard ==
The work's author, Gerard, was the first bishop of Csanád in Hungary (now Cenad in Romania) from 1030 to 1046.

== Subject ==
The work is a treatise on the story of Prophet Daniel's three friends whom King Nebuchadnezzar II sentenced to death for refusing to worship a golden statue. They were thrown into a fiery furnace, but they survived unharmed. In his work, Gerard contrasts "inane philosophy" with "heavenly wisdom".

== Sources ==
- Luscombe, David (2002) [1985]. "The reception of the writings of Denis the pseudo-Areopagite into England". In Greenway, Diana; Holdsworth, Christopher; Sayers, Jane (eds.). Tradition and Change: Essays in Honour of Marjorie Chibnall Presented by Her Friends on the Occasion of Her Seventieth Birthday. Cambridge University. pp. 115–144. ISBN 0-521-52499-7.
- Nemerkényi, Előd (2004). Latin Classics in Medieval Hungary: Eleventh Century. CEU Medievalia. Vol. VI. Central European University. ISBN 9637326049.
- Berend, Nora; Laszlovszky, József; Szakács, Béla Zsolt (2007). "The kingdom of Hungary". In Berend, Nora (ed.). Christianization and the Rise of Christian Monarchy: Scandinavia, Central Europe and Rus', c.900-1200. Cambridge University Press. pp. 319–368. ISBN 978-0-521-87616-2.
