= Sanjak of Çanad =

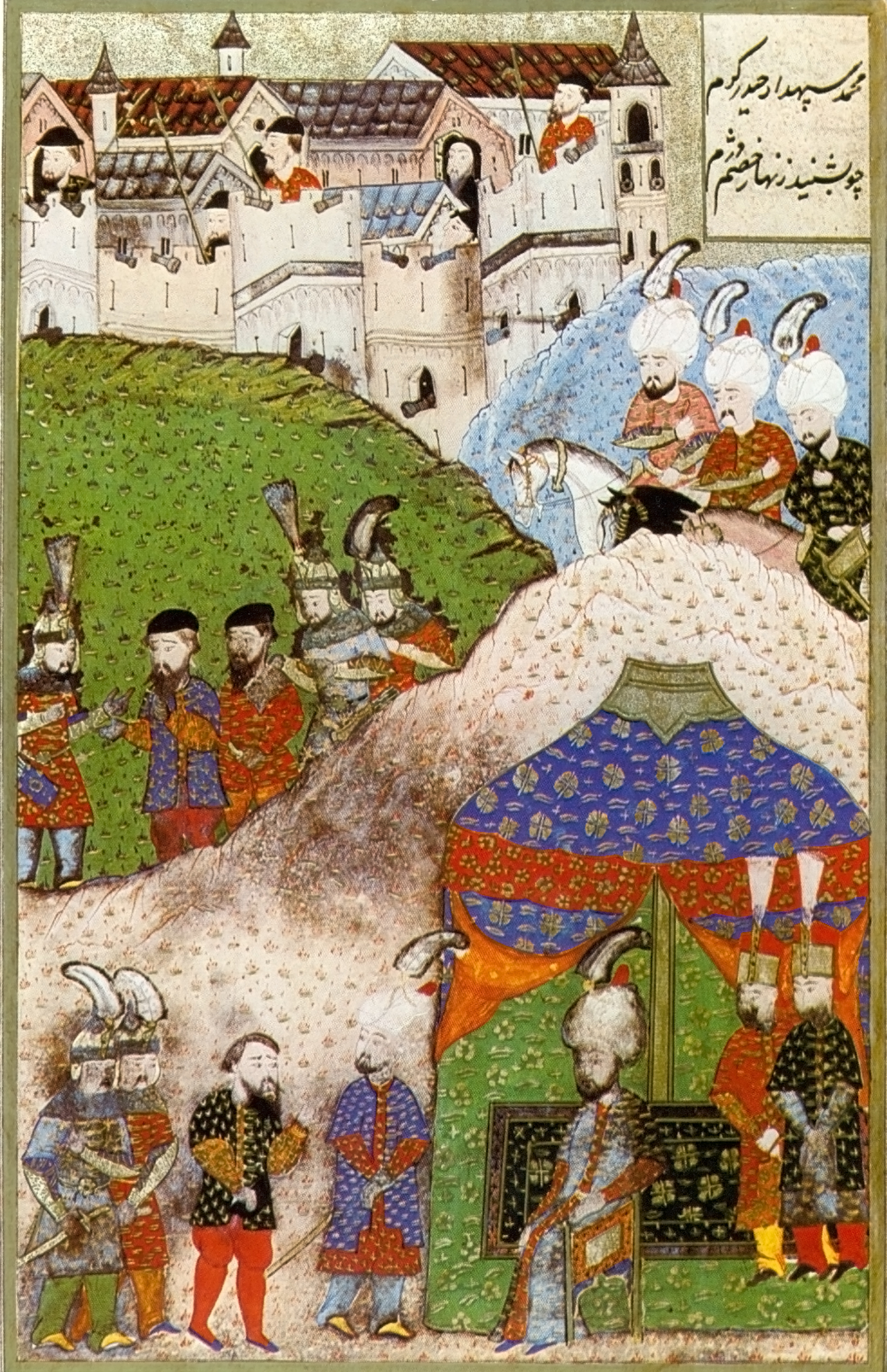
First Ottoman capture of the Cenad fortress, in 1551

The Sanjak of Çanad (Turkish: Çanad sancağı, Liva-i Çanad) was a sanjak (district) of the Ottoman Empire located mostly in what is today northwestern Banat (northernmost Serbia, southernmost Hungary and westernmost Romania), centered at Cenad (Hungarian: Csanád, in modern Romania). It existed from the middle of the 16th century, up to the beginning of the 18th century.

== History ==
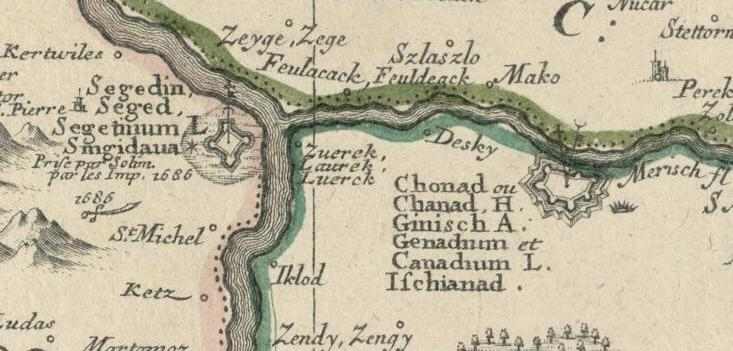
Çanad fortress, as an Ottoman outpost in 1700

After the capture of Belgrade (1521), the Ottomans intensified their incursions towards various territories of the Kingdom of Hungary beyond the Danube, gradually establishing their posts, while the Csanád County remained under the Hungarian rule. After the Battle of Mohács (1526), an Eastern Hungarian Kingdom was created, becoming a vassal state of the Ottoman Empire, and encompassing the Csanád County. By 1536, the Banate of Lugos and Karansebes was established further to the east, as a military frontier towards the Ottomans. In the same time, local magnate Petar Petrović (d. 1557) emerged as a semi-autonomous governor of the region, balancing between Hungarians and the Ottomans.

During the Ottoman campaign in 1551-1552, the entire territory of the Csanád County was conquered and incorporated into the newly formed Temeşvar Eyalet. It was organized as the Sanjak of Çanad, encompassing various regions on both sides of the river Mureș. In 1594-1595, those territories were also affected by the massive anti-Ottoman Banat uprising of local Christians, mainly Serbs and Romanians.

During the Habsburg-Ottoman War (1683-1699), much of the region was temporarily liberated, but under the Treaty of Karlowitz (1699) the entire territory to the south of the river Mureș was returned to the Ottoman rule, while territories to the north were included into the newly formed Habsburg Military Frontier.

In 1707, the Sanjak of Çanad was abolished, becoming a sub-district of the Sanjak of Temeşvar. In 1716, its territory was conquered by Habsburg forces during the Habsburg-Ottoman War (1716–1718). In 1718, the Habsburgs formed a new province in this region, named the Banat of Temeswar, that was encompassing much of the former Sanjak of Çanad.

== See also ==
- Csanád County (medieval)

== Sources ==
- Bulboacă, Sorin (2011). "The Institution of Banat in the Banat of Lugoj and Caransebes in the XVIth-XVIIth Centuries" (PDF). Society and politics: Societate și politica. 51: 88–97. Archived from the original on 2020-11-25.
- Ćirković, Sima (2004). The Serbs. Malden: Blackwell Publishing.
- Dabić, Vojin S. (2011). "The Habsburg-Ottoman War of 1716–1718 and Demographic Changes in the War-Afflicted Territories". The Peace of Passarowitz, 1718. West Lafayette: Purdue University Press. pp. 191–208.
- Dávid, Géza; Fodor, Pál, eds. (1994). Hungarian-Ottoman Military and Diplomatic Relations in the Age of Süleyman the Magnificent. Budapest: Loránd Eötvös University, Hungarian Academy of Sciences, Institute of History.
- Dávid, Géza (1999). "The Eyalet of Temesvár in the Eighteenth Century". Oriente Moderno. 79 (18): 113–128.
- Dávid, Géza (2000). "An Ottoman Military Career on the Hungarian Borders: Kasim Voyvoda, Bey, and Pasha". Ottomans, Hungarians, and Habsburgs in Central Europe: The Military Confines in the Era of Ottoman Conquest. Leden-Boston-Köln: Brill. pp. 265–297.
- Gavrilović, Slavko (1993). "Serbs in Hungary, Slavonia and Croatia in struggles against the Turks (15th–18th centuries)". Serbs in European Civilization. Belgrade: Nova, Serbian Academy of Sciences and Arts, Institute for Balkan Studies. pp. 41–54.
- Hegyi, Klára (2000). "The Ottoman Network of Fortresses in Hungary". Ottomans, Hungarians, and Habsburgs in Central Europe: The Military Confines in the Era of Ottoman Conquest. Leden-Boston-Köln: Brill. pp. 163–193.
- Káldy-Nagy, Gyula (2000). A csanádi szandzsák 1567. és 1579. évi összeírása. Szeged: Csongrád Megyei Levéltár.
- Krstić, Aleksandar R. (2022). "The Emergence of "Sırf Vilâyeti": Serbian Migrations to the Territory of Banat by the mid-16th Century and their Results" (PDF). Migrations in the Slavic Cultural Space. From the Middle Ages to the Present Day. Łódź: Łódź University Press. pp. 95–111. Archived from the original on 2024-05-20.
