= Csanád County (medieval) =

County of the Kingdom of Hungary

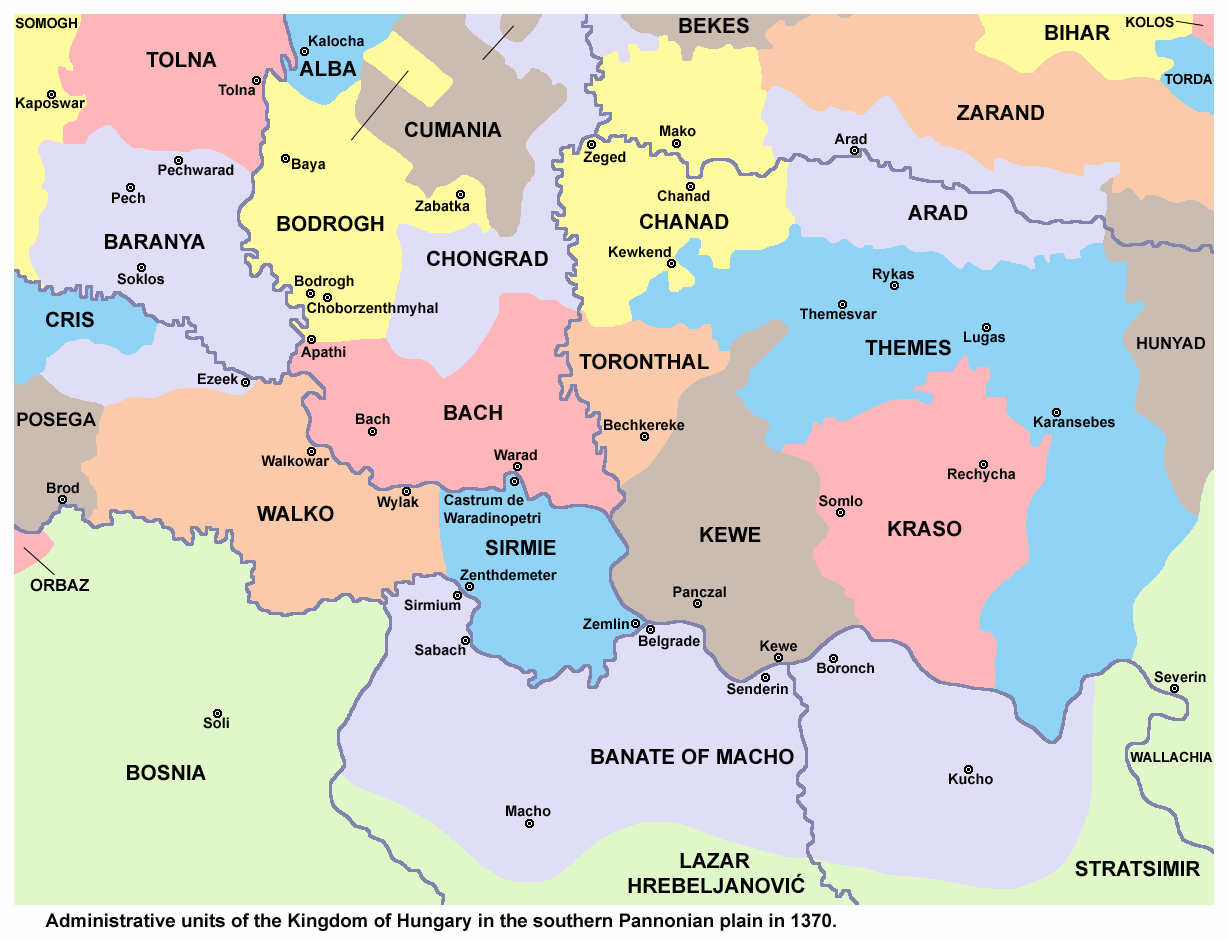
Csanád (Chanad) County in 1370

The Csanád County or Chanad County or (Latin: Comitatus Chanadiensis) was a county of the Kingdom of the medieval Kingdom of Hungary. It was established after Csanád (the eponymous founder) had defeated Ajtony, and the bishopric of Csanád was founded in the 11th century.

== History ==
It was established after Magyar nobleman Csanád (the eponymous founder) had defeated Ajtony, who had ruled over the region now known as Banat (in Romania and Serbia). At urbs Morisena, which was given the name of Csanád, a Roman Catholic bishopric was immediately founded, headed by Gerard. By that time Csanád had been baptized and become the head of the royal county (comitatus) organized around the fortress at Csanád.

Since 1526, the county was controlled by the Eastern Hungarian Kingdom. During the Ottoman campaign in 1551-1552, the county was conquered and its territory was incorporated into the newly formed Sanjak of Çanad, within the Temeşvar Eyalet.

== See also ==
- Banat in the Middle Ages
- Sanjak of Çanad

== Sources ==
- Curta, Florin (2019). Eastern Europe in the Middle Ages (500–1300). Leiden & Boston: Brill.
- Dávid, Géza (2000). "An Ottoman Military Career on the Hungarian Borders: Kasim Voyvoda, Bey, and Pasha". Ottomans, Hungarians, and Habsburgs in Central Europe: The Military Confines in the Era of Ottoman Conquest. Leden-Boston-Köln: Brill. pp. 265–297.
- Engel, Pál (2001). The Realm of St. Stephen: A History of Medieval Hungary, 895-1526. London & New York: Tauris.
- Káldy-Nagy, Gyula (2000). A csanádi szandzsák 1567. és 1579. évi összeírása. Szeged: Csongrád Megyei Levéltár.
- Krstić, Aleksandar; Magina, Adrian (2021). "The Belmužević Family: The Fate of a Noble Family in South-East Europe During the Turbulent Period of the Ottoman Conquest (the 15th and First Half of the 16th Centuries)". Revue des études sud-est européennes. 59: 105–123.
- Pálosfalvi, Tamás (2018). From Nicopolis to Mohács: A History of Ottoman-Hungarian Warfare, 1389-1526. Leiden & Boston: Brill.
