= Uprising in Banat =

1594 rebellion against the Ottomans in Central Europe

- Part of Long Turkish War, Serbian–Ottoman wars
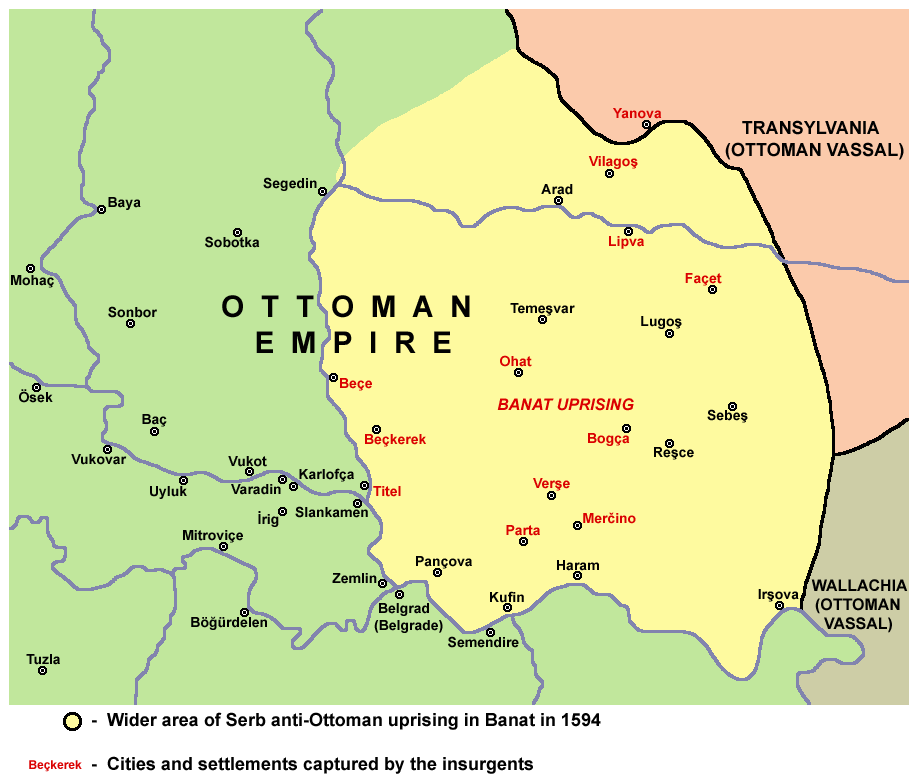
- Map of the Uprising.
Date	March–10 July 1594
Location	Eyalet of Temeşvar, Ottoman Empire (modern Banat region, Serbia and Romania)
Result	Ottoman victory

Belligerents
Serb rebels Supported by: Archduchy of Austria; Banate of Lugos and Karánsebes	Ottoman Empire

Commanders and leaders
Teodor of Vršac (executed); Sava Temišvarac; Velja Mironić; Đorđe Rac; Spahija Vukadin †	Koca Sinan Pasha; Mustafa Pasha; Ali Çavuş

Strength
5,000	20,000–30,000

Casualties and losses
1,000+	Unknown

The Uprising in Banat was a rebellion organized and led by Serbian Orthodox bishop Teodor of Vršac and Sava Temišvarac against the Ottomans in the Eyalet of Temeşvar. The uprising broke out in 1594, in the initial stage of the Long Turkish War, and was fought by local Serbs, numbering some 5,000, who managed to quickly take over several towns in the region before being crushed by the Ottoman army. The relics of Saint Sava were burnt by the Ottomans as a retaliation. Although short-lived, it inspired future rebellions.

== Background ==
=== Status of Serbs ===
Under Ottoman rule, Serbs experienced subjugation, oppression and suppression of their religion and culture. Under the Ottoman tax system of devshirme, male children from Serb families were taken by the state as part of taxes due to the imperial government. These children were forcibly converted to Islam and made to serve as janissaries.

=== Ottoman crisis ===
The reign of Suleiman I has been described as the most famous period in Ottoman history. At the end of his reign, however, the constant wars had taken its toll, damaging the economy. The faulty economic policies that followed shook the economy and with that, the foundations of Ottoman society; state officials quickly became poor, their pay being worthless akçe, and corruption and bribes were common. Mutiny struck throughout the Ottoman Empire, the rebellion of the capital troops in January 1593 assuring the government to seek out a new war of conquest to get out of the crisis. The population (rayah, sr. raja) in the Sanjak of Çanad suffered in this period, since the 1560s. Impoverished sipahi forced peasants to overwork themselves, and the sipahis imposed their own taxes on the peasants, despite laws preventing such actions. Tax collectors, as well, abused their position, taking higher taxes. Beys and vojvode (Christian chiefs) used the population's houses, tools, and animals, and ate free of charge, which was eventually prevented by government order. A result of issues like these led to a massive migration of the population to Transylvania in 1583. Records show the worsening of the population's status, and deteriorating economy (inflation). It could be concluded from Ottoman sources that the main initiators and leaders of the uprising once belonged to the Christian layers in Ottoman military service. After the Ottoman conquest of Gyula in 1566, these began to lose their privileges and became part of the lower class (raja); a part moved to Transylvania and the frontier parts of the empire, a part stayed, while a large number joined hajduk bands.

The defeat of the Ottomans at the Battle of Sisak (22 June 1593) and the uncertain outcome of fighting in Upper Hungary in the beginning of the Long Turkish War (1593–1606) woke up internal problems and also jeopardized Ottoman rule in the vassal principalities of Transylvania, Wallachia, and Moldavia. This also created conditions for the Serb uprising in Banat in 1594.

== Prelude ==
Uprising in Banat

Smaller groups of Ottoman Christian martolosi and some sipahi went rogue when Christian armies conquered Filek and Nógrád during the winter of 1593–94. They gathered in the frontier towards Transylvania (ruled by Ottoman vassal Sigismund Báthory), where numerous hajduk bands were active before the war, and received help from Đorđe Palotić, the Ban of Lugos, and Ferenc Geszti, one of the main Transylvanian commanders. At the beginning the group raided merchant caravans, until their numbers grew and they started attacking lone towers and chardaks. The raja approached only when the group arrived in their areas, while in several places they were forced to join as the rebels threatened to take their properties, and even death (which is contrary to stereotypes of the folk character of uprisal).

In March, a group of rebels led by Petar Majzoš burnt down Vršac and robbed the population of neighbouring villages, then retreated to Transylvania. At the end of March, the rebels attacked and sacked Bocșa and Margina. In this period, it seems, the bandit forays turned into an uprising. The aims of the uprising were expressed by the Orthodox clergy, headed by the bishop of Vršac, Teodor.

== Uprising ==
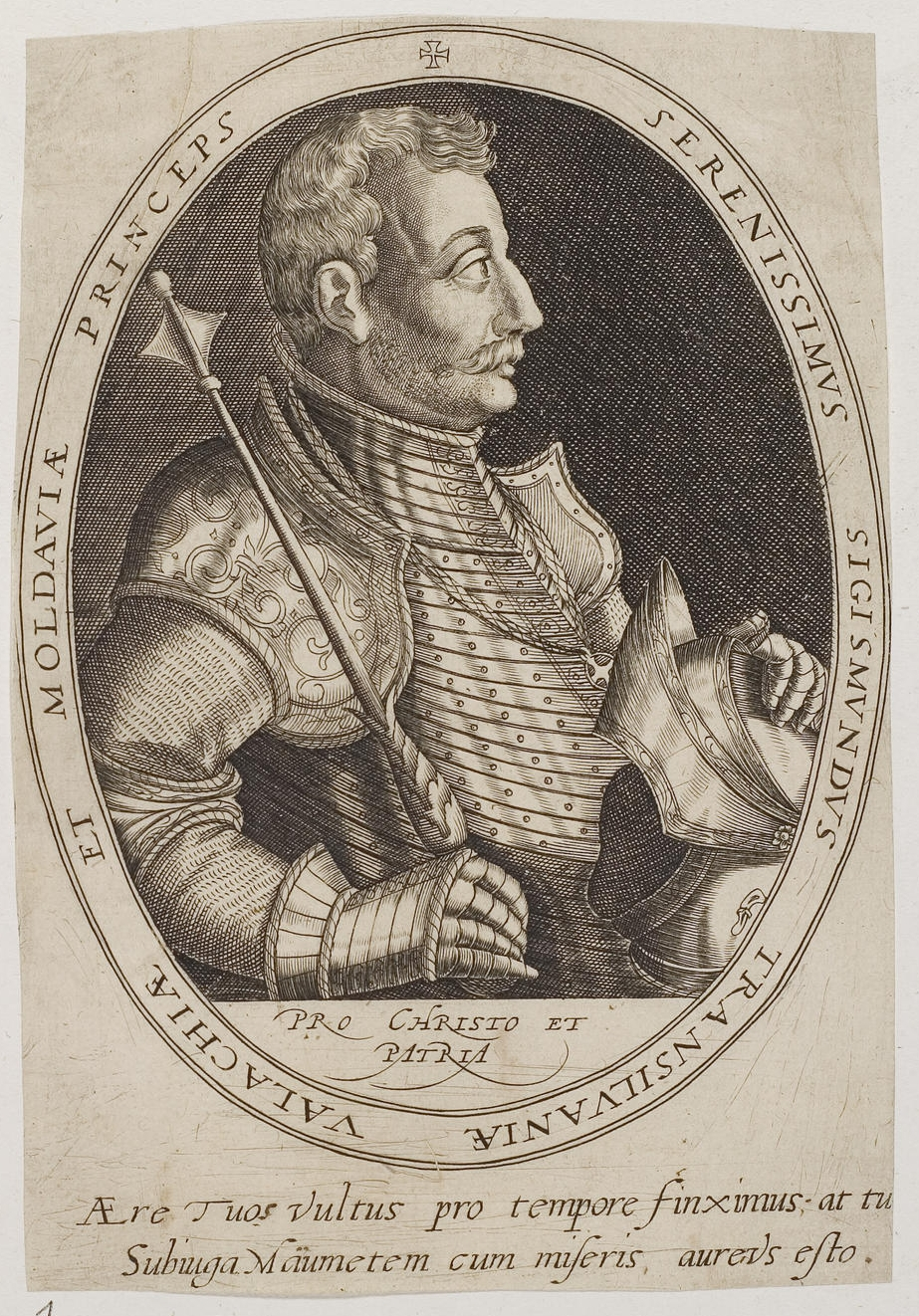
The rebels sought help from Transylvanian Prince Sigismund Báthory.

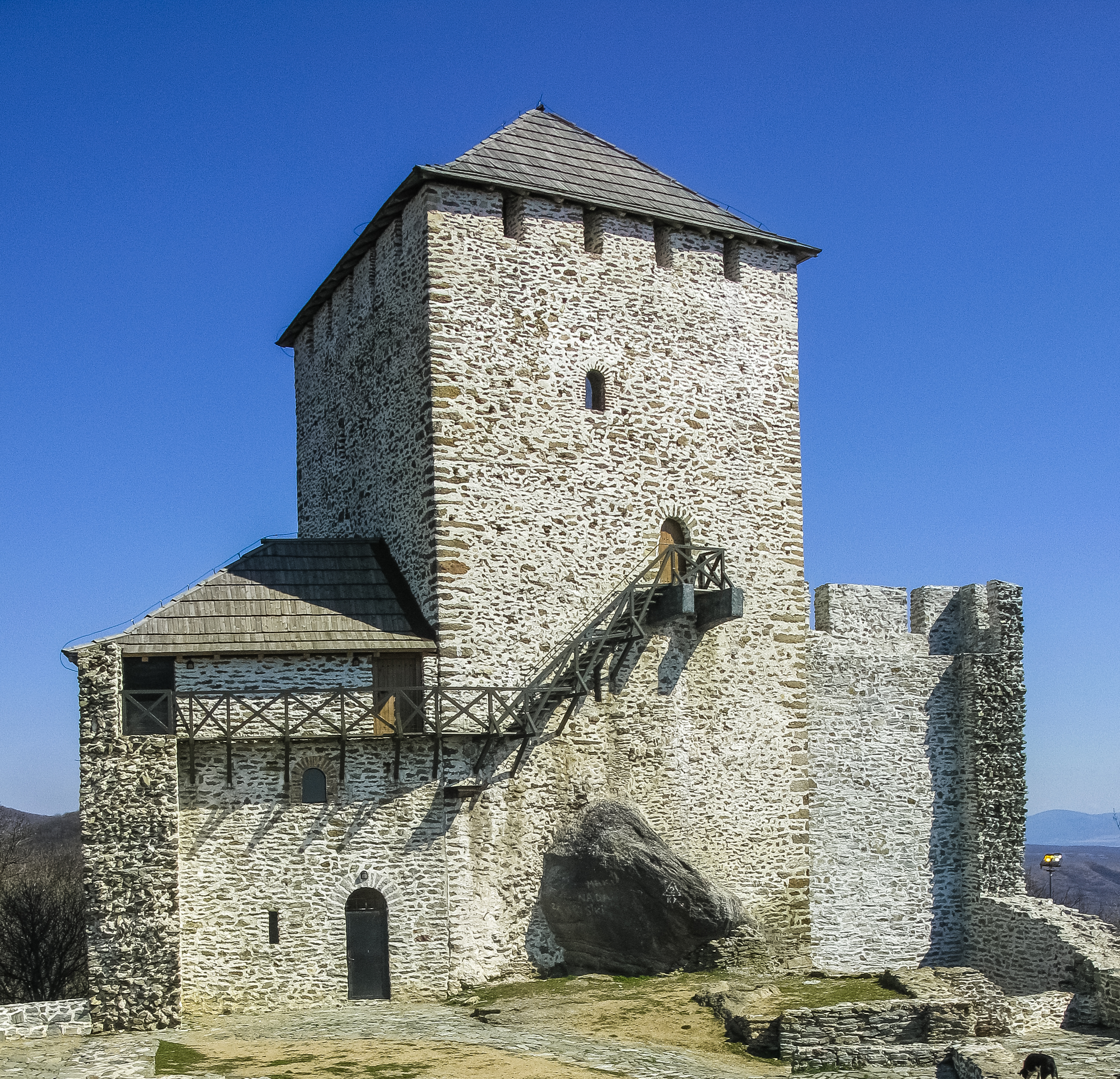
Vršac Fortress

After the operations in the Vršac area, a large Ottoman ship convoy with war material was attacked on the Syrmian side of the Danube, most likely by Syrmian hajduks. In April and May the rebels destroyed important Ottoman strongholds on the left waterside of the Danube, in southern Banat, and V. Krestić notes that these conflicts were perhaps where the rebels had the greatest success. According to Ottoman chronicler Mustafa Selaniki, the rebellion began in Modava, led by an unnamed Christian (identified as the Serb "spahija Vukadin"), a ziamet-holder, who had a high rank in the sipahi organization; after losing his service and lands he went to Sigismund Báthory, from where he quickly returned with several officers who would help in the uprising and establish military organization. In mid-May, Bishop Teodor led a mission which asked of aid from Sigismund Báthory, and in return they offered him the rule of the Serbian throne, however, Báthory insisted on submission to the Ottoman sultan and was unable to meet their demands. The first large success of the rebels was the attack on Modava on the Danube, where they killed the Ottoman crew and set the city fortress on fire. They then defeated the Ottoman security at the dock of Hram and crew of the wooden fortress (palanka) in Pančevo. The Ottoman government sent out an army of 1,000 cavalry and infantry when news about the attacks reached Belgrade and Smederevo. In the ensuing battle near Pančevo on 26 May 1594, the rebel leader Vukadin and 1,000 men were killed, an old Serbian record states that "Serbs and Turks fought ... many Serbs fell".

Immediately after the retreat of Ottoman troops, the remnants of defeated rebels, and rebel groups who had previously devastated the place of Ohat, attacked Beçkerek (Zrenjanin), the rich town built by Grand Vizier Sokollu Mehmed Pasha (1506–1579) as his waqf (endowment). A Western source claims that the rebels had before Ohat conquered Ineu and Világosvár. At Zrenjanin, the rebels had the support of the local population, leading to a quick defeat of the Ottoman resistance. The rebels sought to leave as soon as spoils were collected, however, the locals opposed as they feared Ottoman reprisal. V. Krestić notes that the Ottomans believed that the rebellion would be easy to suppress, appointing a lesser official, emin-i nüzül (grain procurer) Ali Çavuş, who had up until then collected extraordinary war taxes, as commander of a detachment from the Sanjak of Smederevo. The Ottoman detachment was destroyed near Zrenjanin, and Ali Çavuş was dismissed upon returning to Belgrade. The rebels sacked Titel, and many Muslim-inhabited villages in the surroundings, killing many Muslims, and had a large part held prisoner in a church, forcing them to convert to Christianity, according to Mustafa Selaniki. The Muslim population of neighbouring areas which were not caught up in the uprising withdrew to fortified cities. Cut off to the south and east, the few Muslims of the Kanjiža area most likely took to Csanád and Segedin.

Anticipating an Ottoman attack, the rebels asked for help from Transylvania and the Austrians. Rebel requirements were sent from Vršac and Zrenjanin, which points to that there were two independent centres of the rebels. In early June, Bathory summoned a meeting at Gyulafehérvár of his magnates regarding whether to support the Serb rebels; on 11 June the outcome was that they were not to break their subordinance to the Ottomans. The Transylvanian connection did however not stop; Đorđe Palotić stole armament which he sent to the rebels, and encouraged them to continue to fight; he subsequently promised that Báthory would soon appear to them. On 13 June from Vršac, Bishop Teodor, Ban Sava, and Velja Mironić promised, in the name of all their sipahi, knezes, and "all of Serbdom", to faithfully serve the Transylvanian ruler, in a letter to Mózes Székely, who held the frontier at that time. Meanwhile, the Zrenjanin group sought protection from the Viennese court, their envoy Đorđe Rac arrived at Hatvan on 10 June, meeting with general Teuffenbach, and then also Archduke Matthias at Esztergom. The Austrians sent two small detachments, one of which was killed off by Crimean Tatars on the way, while Transylvania's support came down to continued support in the form of officers and moral support. Meanwhile, the war on the front switched noticeably in the favour of the Ottomans. The arrival of Crimean Tatars led by Khan Ğazı II Giray forced the Christian armies to raise the sieges of Esztergom and Hatvan and retreat into Upper Hungary. This led the Grand Vizier Koca Sinan Pasha to devote attention to Banat. He appointed Mehmed Pasha, the Beylerbey of Anatolia, the commander of an army (consisting of troops from the eyalets of Anatolia and Karaman, and also 3,000 Janissaries) that was planned to deal with the rebels in Zrenjanin. As news arrived of spreading of the uprising in the Temeşvar (Timișoara) area, Mustafa Pasha, the Beylerbey of Temeşvar, was ordered to immediately head from Buda for Banat. No serious resistance was given by the rebels, defeated by 10 July 1594.

== Aftermath ==
Ottoman reprisal was daunting. After battles around Zrenjanin the army sacked and burnt villages all the way to the Mureș river (see also Pomorišje). Many settlements were abandoned, and never rebuilt, as the population was either killed or taken slaves, or fled to Transylvania and the Habsburg part of Hungary. The next year, Crimean Tatars wintered in the Eyalet of Temeşvar, which brought new pillage and slavery, and according to contemporary statements no living being could be seen for three days of walking. The longer the war lasted, extraordinary war taxes rose.

In 1596 a Serb uprising broke out in the eastern part of the Sanjak of Herzegovina, organized by the regional Orthodox leadership. It was short-lived, the defeated rebels being forced to capitulate due to lack of foreign support, having likewise requested help from the Christian European states.

== Burning of St. Sava's relics ==
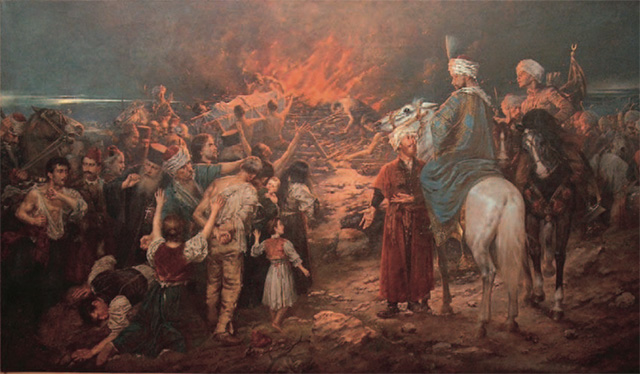
The burning of Saint Sava's relics by the Ottomans. Painting by Stevan Aleksić (1912).

It remains unclear when St. Sava's relics were brought to Belgrade and incinerated. It was either during the uprising or a year after. In an act of retaliation, Grand Vizier Koca Sinan Pasha ordered the flag of the Muhammed to be brought from Damascus to counter the Serb flag, as well as the sarcophagus and relics of Saint Sava located in the Mileševa monastery be brought by military convoy to Belgrade. Along the way, the Ottoman convoy had people killed in their path so that the rebels in the woods would hear of it. On 27 April, the Ottomans had the relics of Saint Sava publicly incinerated on a pyre on the Vračar plateau, and the ashes scattered, made to discourage the Serbs.

Archbishop Sava founded the Serbian Orthodox Church, Serbian ecclesiastical law and national literature. He was canonized as a miracle-worker and equal-to-the -Apostles. His cult was assimilated into folk beliefs in Ottoman times. The veneration of his relics created tension between Serbs and the occupying Ottomans. In 1774, Sava was proclaimed the patron saint of all Serbs. In the 19th century the cult was revived with the prospect of independence from the Ottomans, "representing and reproducing powerful images of a national Golden Age, of national reconciliation and unification, and of martyrdom for the church and nation". After Serbia gained full independence, a cathedral dedicated to the saint was planned, part of modernization plans of Belgrade. Although the construction board for the church was established in 1895, the construction of the winning concept, based on Gračanica and Hagia Sophia, began in 1935. Construction stopped during World War II and the Communist rule, only to be restarted after permission in 1984; as of 2010, the exterior is finished and interior unfinished. The site where Saint Sava's relics were burnt, the Vračar plateau, became the new grounds of the National Library of Serbia and the Church of Saint Sava dedicated to the saint, in the 20th century. From its location, the church dominates Belgrade's cityscape, and has become a national symbol.

== Legacy ==
The size of the uprising is illustrated in a Serbian epic poem: "The whole land has rebelled, six hundred villages arose, everybody pointed his gun against the emperor".

The coat of arms of Vršac, which was first recorded in 1804, includes a decapitated Turk head on a sabre above the Vršac Fortress, which is believed to signify Janko Halabura's duel victory in 1594.

Bishop Teodor was canonized on 29 May 1994 as a hieromartyr (sveštenomučenik), with his feast day on 29 May [O.S. 16 May]. In 2009 the Vršac central square was named "St. Teodor of Vršac". On 28 October 2012, a memorial plaque was put up at the Church of the Holy Archangel Michael in Zrenjanin, honouring Teodor and the rebels. A memorial cross and a red flag with the figure of Saint Sava was erected by the church.

A historical drama play titled Enchanted Castle surrounding the Vršac Castle includes the character of Janko Halabura.

== Annotations ==
1. It is known in historiography as the "Uprising of the Serbs in Banat" (Serbian: Устанак Срба у Банату/Ustanak Srba u Banatu), "Serb uprising in Banat" (српски устанак у Банату), and simply "Uprising in Banat" (устанак у Банату).
2. Although historiography has been divided on whether it was done by Sigismund Báthory or the Banat rebels, V. Krestić concludes that it was most likely Syrmian hajduks. Numerous western sources claimed Báthory, while chronicler Cesare Campana who wrote his work immediately after the war wrote that it was Serbs; J. Tomić and later R. Samardžić opted for Campana and concluded that rebels from Banat systematically crossed into Syrmia with the aim of slowing down the advance of the Ottoman army. V. Krestić notes that Báthory only left Ottoman service the next year, and it is unlikely that it was done by the Banat rebels, at that time hiding in the frontier towards Transylvania; Ottoman chronicler Mustafa Naima asserted that hajduk bands in Syrmia numbered up to 500 that year, which points that this was their act, especially since they plundered many places in Syrmia, burnt Zemun, and took tribute from millers in the environs visibly to the Belgrade Turks.
3. According to Western sources the Beylerbey of Temeşvar Hasan Pasha or Sofi Sinan Pasha set out with 5,000 or 11,000 soldiers. This is incorrect, since the Eyalet of Temeşvar troops under the command of Mustafa Pasha were at that time at the defence of Buda. Tarih-i Naima and Tarih-i Selaniki states that it was Ali Çavuş. Western sources claim that the army of Sofi Sinan Pasha was destroyed, and that the rebels then conquered Lipova, and another source claims that 25,000 Turks were killed by the rebels.

== Sources ==
Books

- Đurđev, B.; Čubrilović, V.; Tadić, J. (1960). Народни покрети и устанци крајем XVI и почетком XVII века. Vol. II. Belgrade. pp. 460–477.
- Ekmečić, Milorad (2008). Дуго кретање између клања и орања (2nd ed.). Belgrade: Завод за уџбенике.
- Ivić, Aleksa (1929). Историја Срба у Војводини. Novi Sad: Matica srpska.
- Ivić, Aleksa (1914). Историја Срба у Угарској: од пада Смедерева до сеобе под Чарнојевићем (1459-1690). Zagreb: Привредникова.
- Krestić, Vasilije (2003). "Устанак Срба у Банату 1594. године и Дуги Рат". Istorija Novog Kneževca i okoline. Novi Kneževac: Skupština opštine.
- Samardžić, Radovan; Veselinović, Rajko L.; Popović, Toma (1993). Samardžić, Radovan (ed.). Историја српског народа: Срби под туђинском влашћу (1537–1699). Belgrade: Srpska književna zadruga.
  - Samardžić, Radovan (1993). "Дуги рат између Аустрије и Турске (1593–1606)". Историја српског народа III/1. Belgrade: Srpska književna zadruga. pp. 214–335.
- Tomić, J. (1899). О устанку Срба у Банату 1594. године. Belgrade.
- Vinaver, Vuk (1953). Прве устаничке борбе против Турака. Просвета. p. 17.

Journals

- Bakić-Hayden, Milica (2010). "Saint Sava and the power (s) of spiritual authority" (PDF). Serbian Studies. 24 (1). NASSS: 49–62. doi:10.1353/ser.2012.0015. S2CID 145778617. Archived from the original (PDF) on 2016-08-10.
- Milanović, Ljubomir (2010). "Materializing authority: the church of Saint Sava in Belgrade and its architectural significance" (PDF). Serbian Studies. 24 (1). NASSS: 63–81. doi:10.1353/ser.2012.0018. S2CID 144270672. Archived from the original (PDF) on 2016-08-10.
- Sotirović, Vladislav B. (2011). "The Serbian Patriarchate of Peć in the Ottoman Empire: The First Phase (1557–94)" (PDF). Serbian Studies. 25 (2). NASSS: 143–169. doi:10.1353/ser.2011.0038. S2CID 143629322. Archived from the original (PDF) on 2016-08-10.
- Vulović, Vladislav (1996). "Устанак Срба у Банату 1594. године". Рад музеја Војводине. 37–38. Novi Sad: Muzej Vojvodine: 255–262.
