= Ferenc Geszti =

Transylvanian nobleman

Ferenc Geszti (Hungarian: Franciscus Gezthy, Hungarian: Geszti Ferenc/Gezthy Ferencz, Romanian: Ghesti Freanț, Serbo-Croatian: Franjo Gesti; 1545–11 May 1595) was a Transylvanian nobleman, the captain of Déva. He belonged to the Geszti family (also Gezthy, Gezti, Gesty, de Gezth). He was a Calvinist. In the beginning of the Long Turkish War (1593–1606) he was one of the main Transylvanian commanders. He and Đorđe Palotić, the Ban of Lugos, helped some Ottoman Christian mutineers at the frontier in the winter of 1593–94; these later grew in numbers and initiated the Uprising in Banat (1594).
