= Cenad =

- Commune
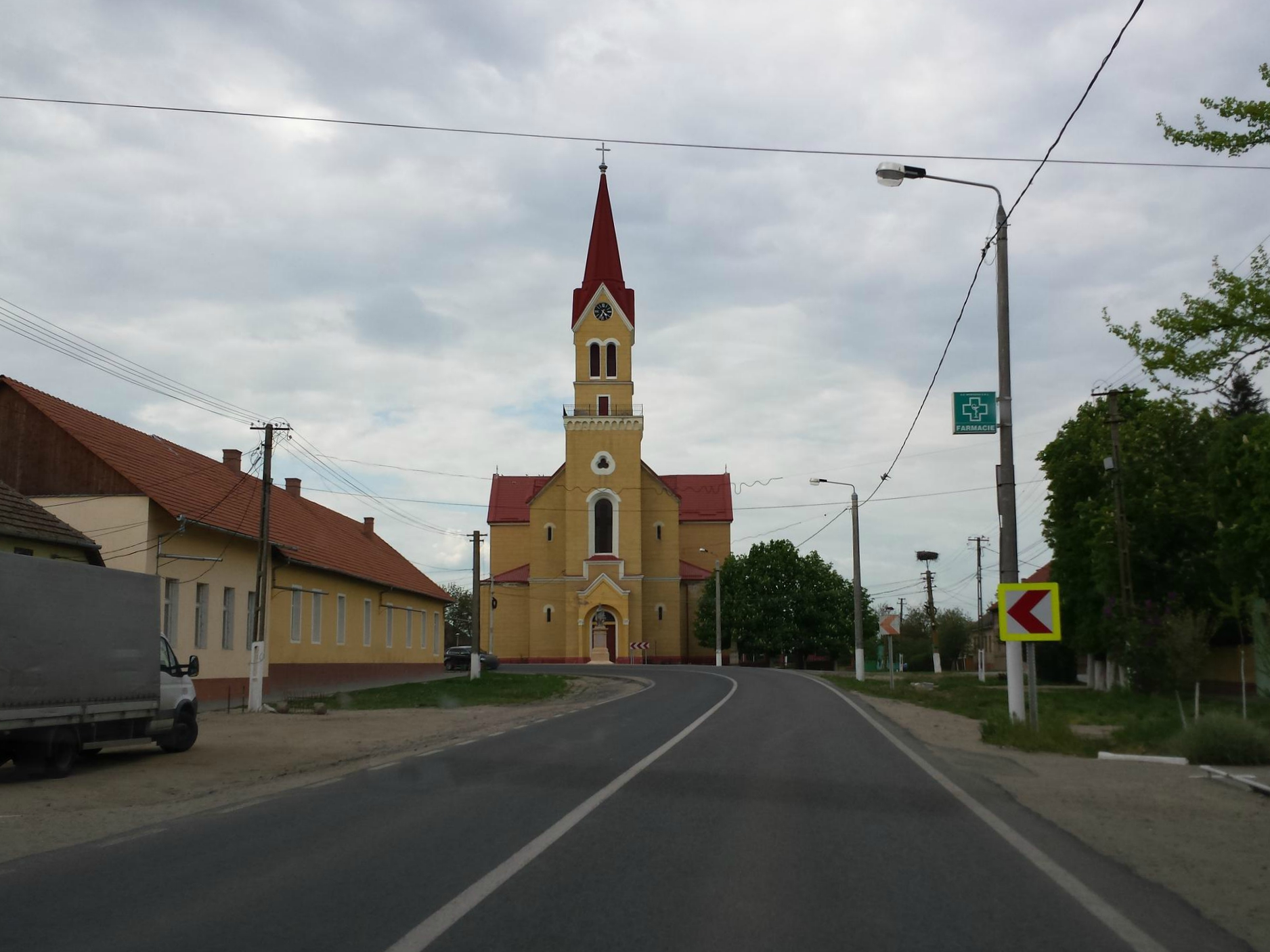
- The Roman Catholic church in Cenad

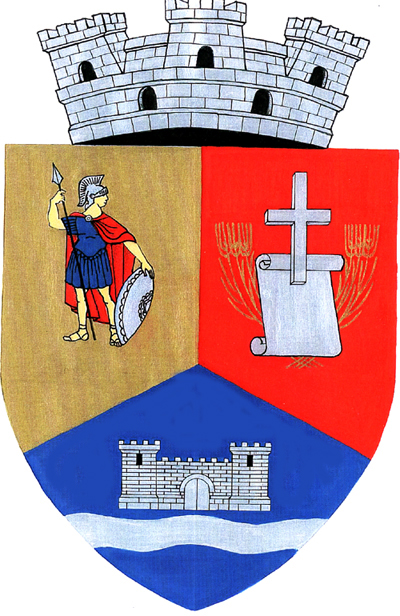
- Coat of arms

- Location in Timiș County

- Location in Romania
- Coordinates: 46°8′N 20°35′E
- Country: Romania
- County: Timiș
- Established: 1000 (urbe Morisena)

Government
  - Mayor (2020–): Andrei Tița (USR)
- Area: 102.51 km^{2} (39.58 sq mi)
- Population (2021-12-01): 3,537
  - Density: 34.50/km^{2} (89.36/sq mi)
- Time zone: UTC+02:00 (EET)
  - Summer (DST): UTC+03:00 (EEST)
- Postal code: 307095
- Vehicle reg.: TM
- Website: www.cenad.ro

Cenad (Hungarian: Nagycsanád, during the Dark Ages Marosvár; German: Großtschanad, archaically Miereschburg; Serbian: Нађчанад, romanized: Nađčanad; Latin: Chanadinum) is a commune in Timiș County, Romania. It is composed of a single village, Cenad. The village serves as a customs point on the border with Hungary. Today's village was formed by merging Cenadu Mare ("Great Cenad" or "Rascian Cenad"; Serbian: Српски Чанад, romanized: Srpski Čanad) and Cenadu Vechi ("Old Cenad" or "German Cenad"; German: Deutsch Tschanad) in the 20th century.

== Geography ==
Cenad is located in the west of Timiș County, on the left bank of the Mureș River, on the border with Hungary. It borders Igriș to the northeast, Saravale to the southeast, Sânnicolau Mare to the south, Dudeștii Vechi to the southwest and Beba Veche to the west.

=== Climate ===
The climate is temperate continental, with weak Mediterranean influences. It is manifested by milder winters and summers that are not excessively hot, the average annual temperature being 10.8 °C (51.4 °F), and the average multiannual rainfall being 536.3 mm (21.11 in).

== History ==
Cenad is one of the localities with the oldest documented history in the entire Banat. The human presence is signaled on its territory since the Neolithic, about 7,000 years ago. Archaeological cultures such as Starčevo–Criș, Vinča, Tisza and Tiszapolgár, through discoveries in several places, demonstrate the consistency of human habitation at that time. From the Bronze Age there are archaeological discoveries of household objects and funerary urns. The Roman era is well represented by numerous discoveries, both pottery, tools, bricks from various constructions bearing the stamps of some Roman military units and coins issued by various Roman emperors. Later, other discoveries confirmed the Byzantine influence and the existence of a settlement from the 8th–9th centuries.

=== From Morisena to Cenad ===
Cenad was known until the 13th century as Morisena. The legionary camp of the Legio XIII Gemina was located there. In the Middle Ages, the site was a temporary capital for Huns and then for Avars. It was subsequently ruled by the First Bulgarian Empire, prior to the Hungarian conquest. At the beginning of Stephen I's reign, the first King of Hungary, Ahtum had his residence here, who brought architects from Greece to build a church, a monastery and a palace. Being a pagan, his rulership was marked by several abuses against the local population, which is why Stephen I decided to send against him Chanadinus, a relative of the king and a former friend of Ahtum, Christianized at Esztergom. Chanadinus defeated and killed Ahtum, occupying his realm. As a reward, the king establishes a new county bearing Chanadinus' name and having its seat at Morisena, which also receives the status of royal fortress.

In 1030 the king established a diocese led by Gerard, bishop of Venice, who would become a saint of the Catholic Church. He built a church and established a monastery dedicated to the Mother of God. On this occasion he brought Italian engineers, who settled here and built on the site of the old fortress of Morisena the fortress of Cenad.

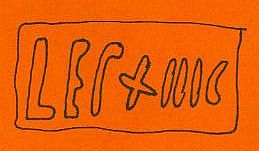
Drawing of a brick stamp of Legio XIII Gemina from Cenad

=== Middle Ages ===
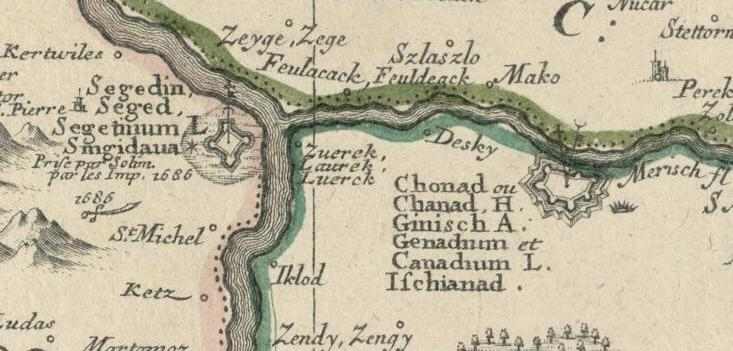
Cenad (Chanad) on a map by Vincenzo Coronelli

During the Middle Ages, Cenad was quite important in the Kingdom of Hungary. As proof are the visits that different kings made here over time: Ladislaus IV in 1278, Charles I in 1322, Louis I in 1366, Sigismund several times between 1394–1436 and Ladislaus V in 1459. John Hunyadi was at one time prefect of Csanád County.

Cenad was attacked and destroyed during the great Tatar invasion of 1241. It was later rebuilt by Bishop Bulcsú Lád. Cenad was the initial seat of the homonymous county, until 1526. It was part of the Eastern Hungarian Kingdom between 1526 and 1551, before the Ottoman conquest. It was the center of the Sanjak of Çanad between 1551 and 1595 and again between 1598 and 1707. From 1707 to 1716, it was a kaza center within the Sanjak of Temeşvar in the Eyalet of Temeşvar. Ottoman rule there was interrupted when the area was occupied by the Principality of Transylvania between 1595 and 1598, and ended with the Austrian conquest in 1716.

=== 18th–20th centuries ===
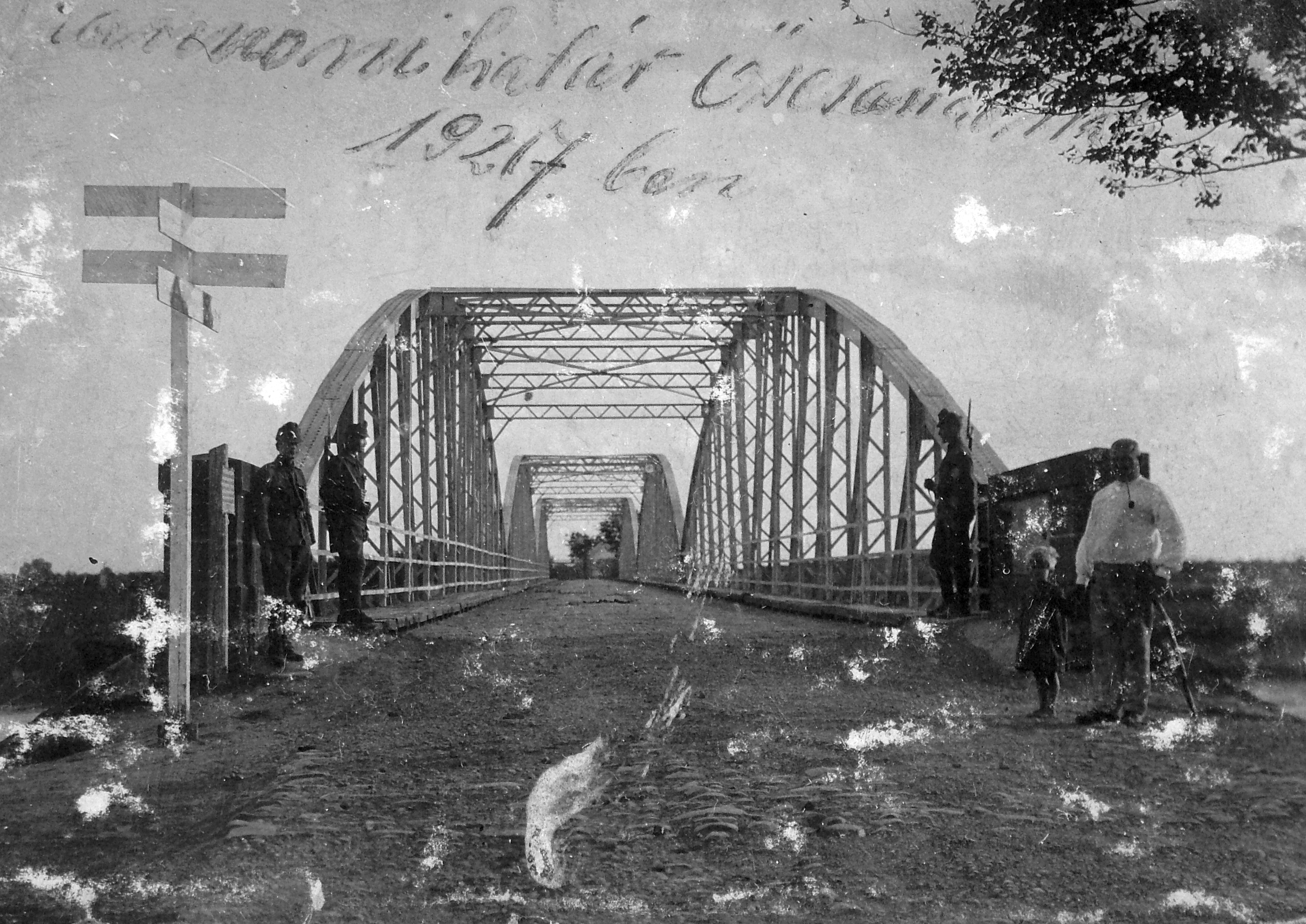
The former iron bridge over the Mureș between Apátfalva and Cenad

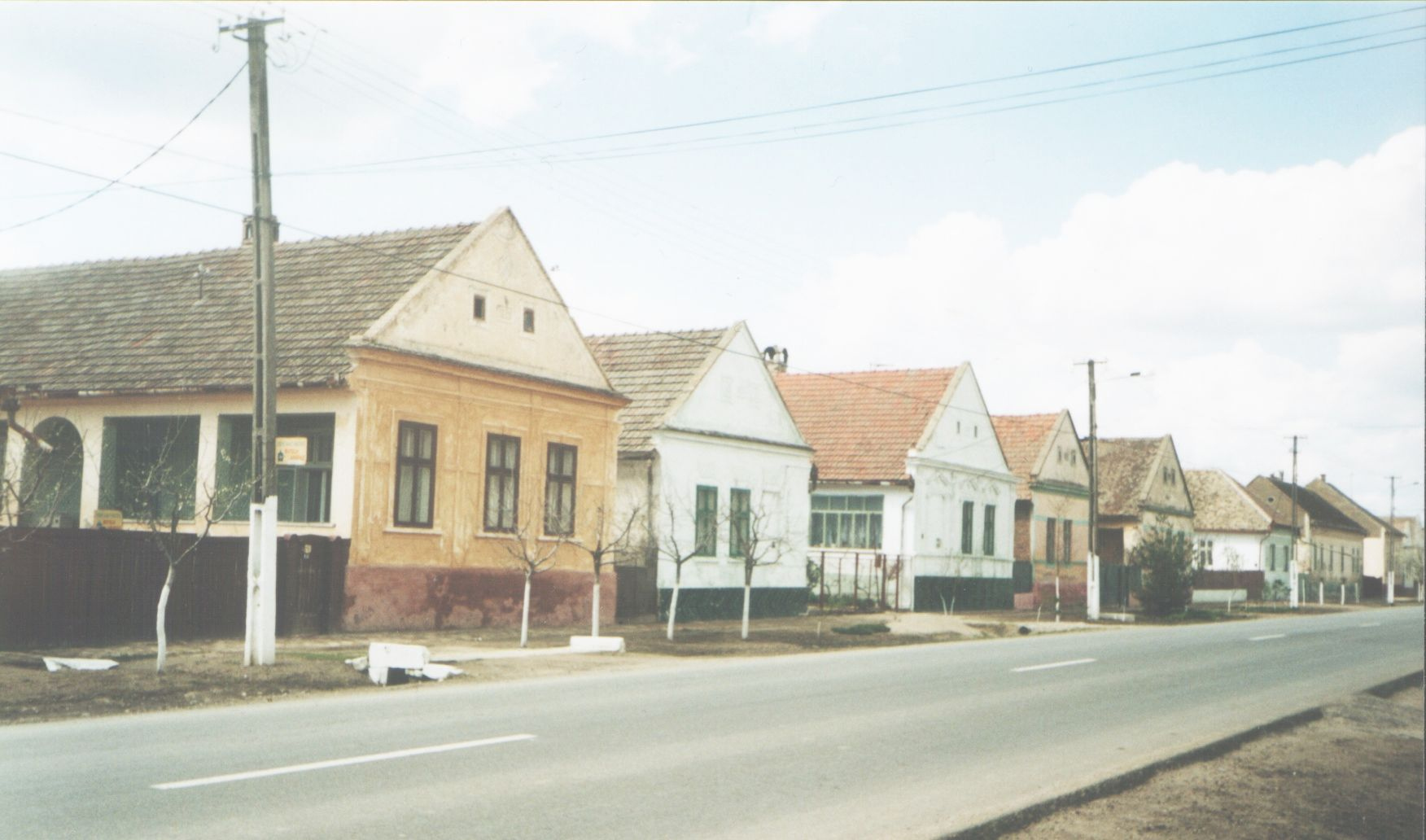
Traditional Swabian houses in Deutsch Tschanad ("German Cenad")

After the defeat of the Turks by the Austrians, among the conditions of the Treaty of Karlowitz in 1699 was the demolition of the fortresses in Banat, as was the case of Cenad. The actual demolition took place under the coordination of General Oettingen. At that time, Cenad was inhabited mostly by Serbs.

Under the Austrians, German colonizations began; the first wave settled here in 1764–1765, establishing a new locality, "German Cenad", alongside what was known as "Serbian Cenad". The two settlements later merged into a single entity: "Great Cenad".

In 1779, the town was transferred from Csanád County to Torontál County. In 1858 it became the property of the Aromanian family Nakó, who also built a castle here.

Cenad was occupied by Serbian troops in 1918 and was passed to Romania after the Treaty of Trianon in 1920.

== Demographics ==
Ethnic composition (2021)
1. Romanians (63.0%)
2. Roma (9.64%)
3. Hungarians (9.04%)
4. Serbs (4.58%)
5. Unknown (12.6%)
6. Others (1.17%)
Religious composition (2021)
1. Orthodox (58.2%)
2. Roman Catholics (15.9%)
3. Serbian Orthodox (4.49%)
4. Greek Catholics (3.90%)
5. Pentecostals (3.13%)
6. Unknown (13.0%)
7. Others (1.36%)

Cenad had a population of 3,537 inhabitants at the 2021 census, down 15.93% from the 2011 census. Most inhabitants are Romanians (62.99%), larger minorities being represented by Roma (9.64%), Hungarians (9.04%) and Serbs (4.58%). For 12.58% of the population, ethnicity is unknown. By religion, most inhabitants are Orthodox (58.21%), but there are also minorities of Roman Catholics (15.91%), Serbian Orthodox (4.49%), Greek Catholics (3.9%) and Pentecostals (3.13%). For 13% of the population, religious affiliation is unknown.

Census		Ethnic composition
Year	Population	Romanians	Hungarians	Germans	Roma	Serbs
1880	6,982	2,074	128	3,166	–	1,495
1890	7,427	2,216	166	3,418	–	1,567
1900	7,389	2,246	211	3,244	–	1,583
1910	7,187	2,073	613	2,750	–	1,590
1920	7,219	2,146	534	3,184	–	–
1930	7,236	2,120	655	2,985	227	1,216
1941	7,526	2,341	718	2,878	–	–
1956	6,089	2,541	755	1,744	7	1,023
1966	5,614	2,036	730	1,645	337	851
1977	5,022	2,023	682	1,419	229	654
1992	3,991	2,304	734	83	450	401
2002	4,249	2,820	657	48	367	320
2011	4,207	2,667	520	27	519	269
2021	3,537	2,228	320	25	341	162

== Politics and administration ==
The commune of Cenad is administered by a mayor and a local council composed of 12 councilors. The mayor, Andrei Tița, from the Save Romania Union, has been in office since 2020. As from the 2024 local elections, the local council has the following composition by political parties:

Party	Seats	Composition
Save Romania Union–People's Movement Party–Force of the Right	10	
Social Democratic Party–National Liberal Party	2	

== Tourist attractions ==
- The ruins of the former fortress. It was built in the 13th century, destroyed during the great Tatar invasion of 1241 and rebuilt in the 16th century as a result of the Ottoman–Habsburg wars. The stone and earth fortifications were destroyed in the early 18th century to make way for the construction of the present-day village.
- The ruins of the former monastery dedicated to Saint John the Baptist. It was built by Greek architects hired by Ahtum in the late 10th century. A new monastery – Morisena Monastery – was founded here in 2003.
- St. Gerard Roman Catholic church, a neo-Gothic church built in 1870. It houses Gerard of Csanád's sarcophagus, honored as a saint and martyr in 1083.
- Cenad Forest (310.5 ha or 767 acres) and Great Island (3 ha or 7.4 acres) nature reserves, included in the Lunca Mureșului Natural Park

== Notable people ==
- Carol Telbisz (1853–1914), lawyer and mayor of Timișoara
- Gheorghe Galetin (b. 1933), musicologist, folklorist, conductor and instrumentalist
- Tomislav Giurici (b. 1936), conductor and composer
- Milan Luchin (1936–2005), musician
- Ioan Hațegan (b. 1949), historian and publicist
