= Theodore of Vršac =

16th-century Serbian Orthodox bishop and military leader

Saint Teodor Теодор
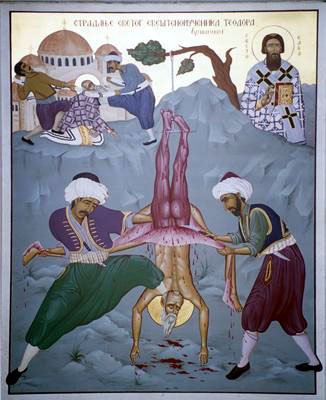
- Icon depicting the martyrdom of Theodore of Vršac in 1594

Bishop of Vršac Eparchy of Banat
- Venerated in: Eastern Orthodox Church
- Church: Serbian Orthodox Church
- See: Eparchy of Banat
- Term ended: 1594
- Predecessor: ?
- Successor: ?

Orders
- Ordination: Patriarch Manuel I of Constantinople

Personal details
- Born: Teodor Nestorović
- Died: 1594
- Denomination: Orthodox Christian

Sainthood
- Feast day: May 29 [O.S. May 16]
- Venerated in: Serbian Orthodox Church
- Canonized: by Serbian Orthodox Church
- Attributes: leader of the Banat Uprising, protector of the poor, writer

Teodor (Serbian Cyrillic: Теодор; d. 1594) was the Serbian Orthodox Bishop of Vršac (епископ вршачки), who in 1594 was the leader of the Banat Uprising against Ottoman occupation amidst the Long War (1593–1606). After talks with Sigismund Báthory, Teodor organized the revolt with Sava Ban and voivode Velja Mironić. The revolt saw the liberation of the villages of Banat, with Vršac. The Serb rebels used icon depictions of Saint Sava as war flags, as it would strengthen them in battle. Sinan Pasha of Temeşvar Eyalet captured Teodor and had him flayed and burned alive. The same year, as a response to the uprising, Saint Sava's remains were burnt at the Vračar hill on the order of Sinan Pasha, who fought the rebels. Teodor was proclaimed a saint (as "Свети свештеномученик Теодор, епископ вршачки", Saint Hieromartyr Theodore, Bishop of Vršac) of the Serbian Orthodox Church, canonized on May 29, 1994, with his feast on May 16 (Julian), or May 29 (Gregorian).

== Notes ==
1. In Hungarian, he was called with the surname Tivodorović. This surname is variously written in historiography as Tivodorović (Тиводоровић), Teodorović (Теодоровић), Tiodorović (Тиодоровић), while according to others his real surname was Nestorović (Несторовић). He is commonly known as vladika Teodor (владика Теодор) or episkop Teodor (епископ Теодор), "bishop Teodor".
