= Mona Nicoară =

Romanian director and producer

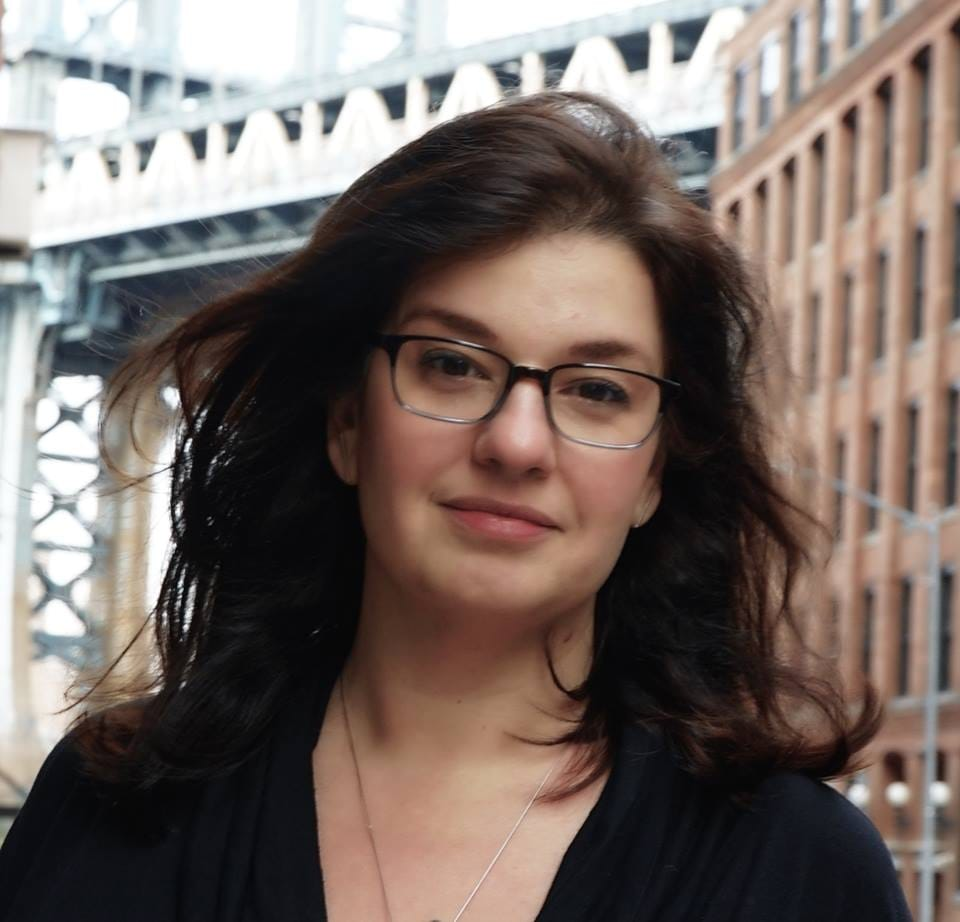
- Born: 21 May; Ineu, Romania
- Occupations: Director and Producer
- Years active: 2011–present

Mona Nicoară is a Romanian film director and producer. She is best known for her work on the documentary films Our School and The Distance Between Me and Me.

== Life and career ==
Mona was born in Ineu, Arad County and is currently based in New York City. She graduated from the University of Bucharest and Columbia University in New York. In 2001, she started her career as an associate producer for Children Underground. Her directorial debut documentary film Our School premiered in the United States at the 2011 Tribeca Film Festival and won the Grand Jury Prize for the Best US Feature at SilverDocs. Her second documentary film The Distance Between Me and Me is about Romanian poet Nina Cassian. She has taught writing and literature at Columbia University and the Cooper Union and film at New York University Tisch School of the Arts and Rutgers University.

== Filmography ==
Year	Film	Director	Producer	Notes
2011	Our School	✓	✓	Documentary
2018	The Distance Between Me and Me	✓	✓	Documentary
