= Hasan Pasha of Temeşvar =

Ottoman governor of Temeşvar

Hasan Pasha (fl. 1593–1594) was the Beylerbey of the Temeşvar Eyalet. During the Uprising in Banat (1594), he received aid from the Grand Vizier Koca Sinan Pasha and the Pasha of Budin, thus appeared with an army numbering 20,000 soldiers and attacked Becskerek (Zrenjanin), in the hands of 4,300 rebels, ending in a decisive Ottoman victory. Subsequently, Sinan Pasha took an army of 30,000 soldiers which suppressed the badly armed Serbs.
