= Csanád =

11th-century Hungarian nobleman

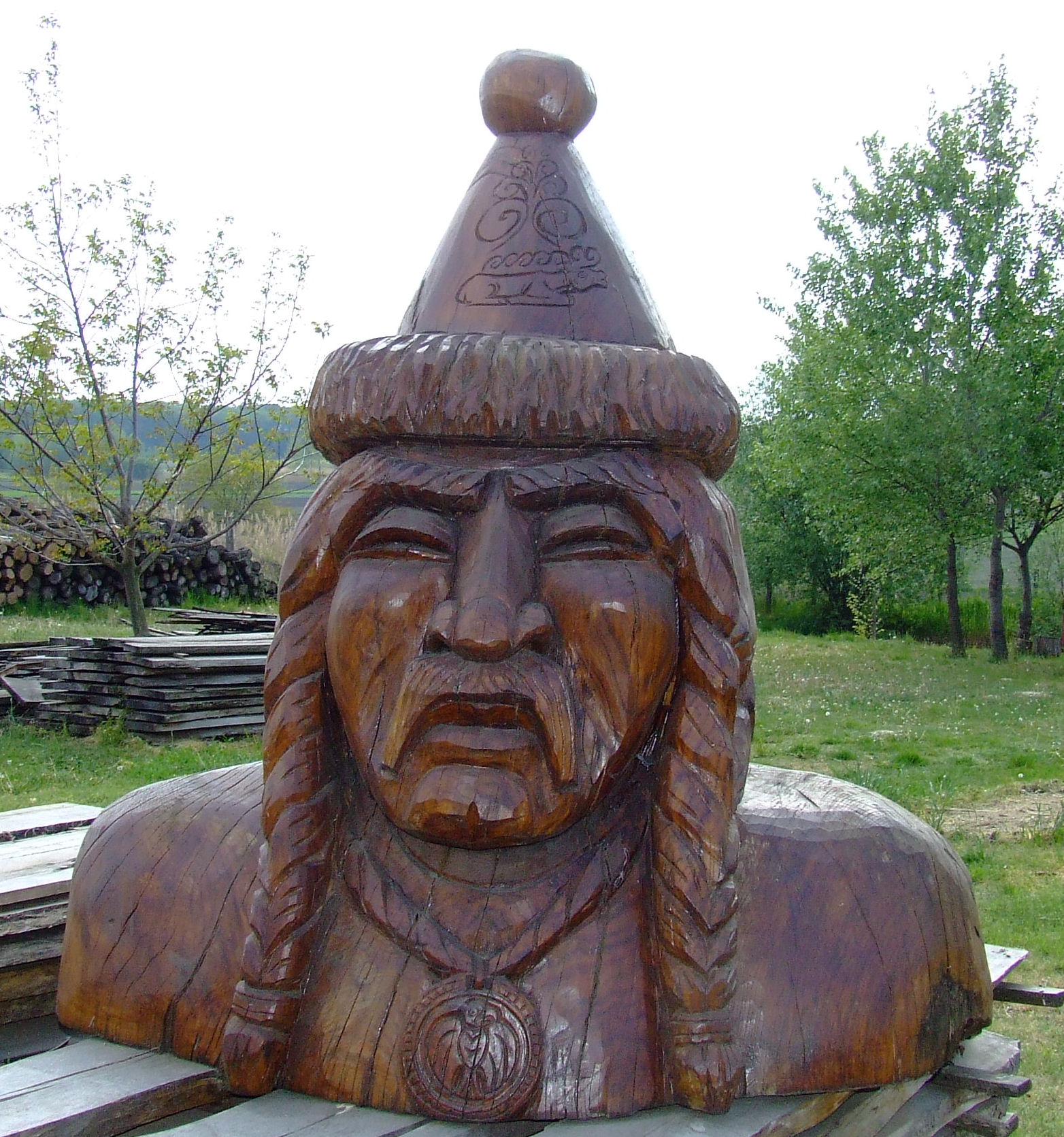
Bust of Csanád in Érsekcsanád

Csanád, also Chanadinus, or Cenad, was the first head (comes) of Csanád County in the Kingdom of Hungary in the first decades of the 11th century.

Csanád defeated and killed Ajtony who had ruled over the region now known as Banat (in Romania and Serbia). Csanád County and its capital (Cenad, in Hungarian Csanád) were named after him.

== Life ==
=== Ajtony's lieutenant ===
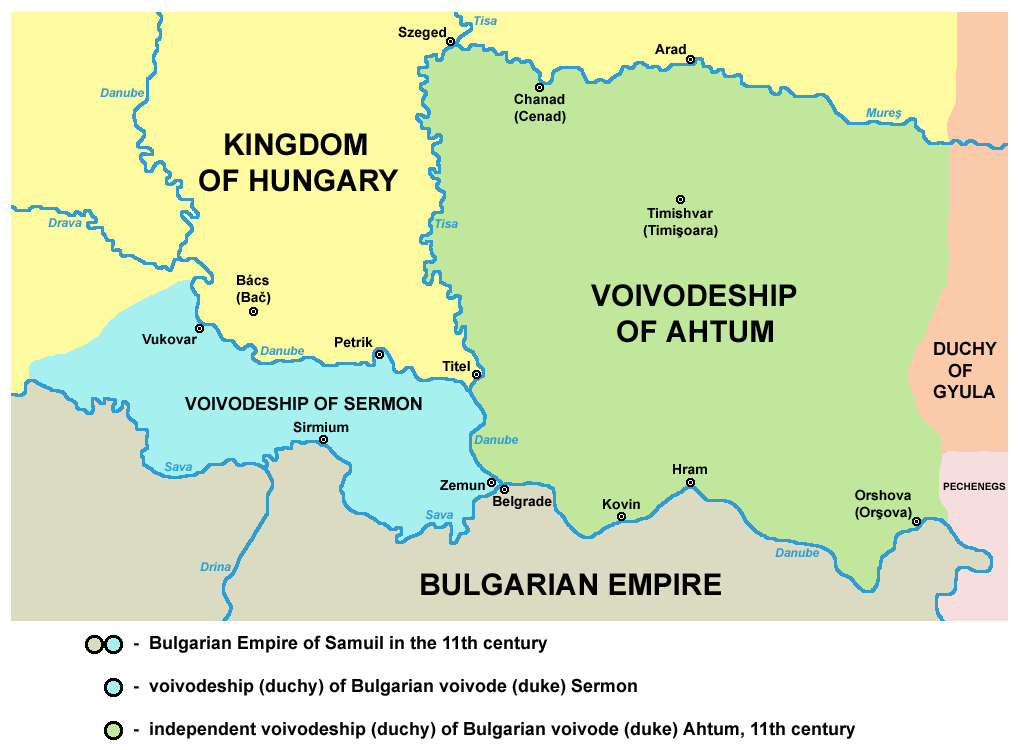
Ajtony's realm which was occupied by Csanád in the name of King Stephen I of Hungary

The anonymous author of the 13th-century Gesta Hungarorum states that Csanád was the nephew of King Stephen I of Hungary (1000/1001–1038) (nepos regis) and his father's name was Doboka. According to the Long Life of St Gerard, an early 14th-century compilation of different sources, Csanád was a pagan in the service of Ajtony (Ahtum), who rose to become the first official at his court by the end of the 1020s.

Ajtony, who himself maintained alliance with the Byzantine Empire, controlled traffic along the river and taxed transport of salts from Transylvania to the heartland of Pannonia. It was in relation to salt that Ajtony found himself in conflict with Stephen, the newly proclaimed king of Hungary. Many historians date their clash to the end of the 1020s, although György Györffy and other scholars put it at least a decade earlier. The conflict arose when Ajtony, who "had taken his power from the Greeks", according to Saint Gerard's legend, levied tax on the salt transported to Stephen on the river.

=== Stephen's general ===
Both the Gesta Hungarorum and the St. Gerard hagiography attribute a significant role to Csanád in defeating Ajtony around between 1027 and 1030 (traditionally in 1028). The latter narrates that, accused of conspiring against Ajtony, Csanád – after his former lord attempted to execute him – fled to the royal court of Stephen, where he was baptized. When Stephen prepared to conquer Ajtony's realm, he placed Csanád at the head of a large army. Anonymus writes that the Hungarian king sent a large army led by his nephew Csanád against Ajtony. After crossing the Tisza, the royal army engaged Ajtony's troops but was forced to withdraw to the area between Szőreg and Kanizsa. Gerard's legend narrates that Csanád set up camp at the hill called Oroszlános and prayed to Saint George for victory (after the war, Csanád founded a monastery here). In a second battle, Stephen's army routed Ajtony's troops near modern Banatsko Aranđelovo or at Tomnatic. Csanád killed Ajtony, either on the battlefield (according to the Long Life) or in his stronghold on the Maros (Mureș) (according to the Gesta Hungarorum). Gerard's hagiography writes that Csanád himself cut off Ajtony's head and tore out his tongue and hid it in his bag. Since both works are based on contemporary heroic song and local church tradition, the authenticity of these details is highly doubtful, in addition to the fact that the distance between the locations is too great for the opposing parties to have fought two battles in a single night.

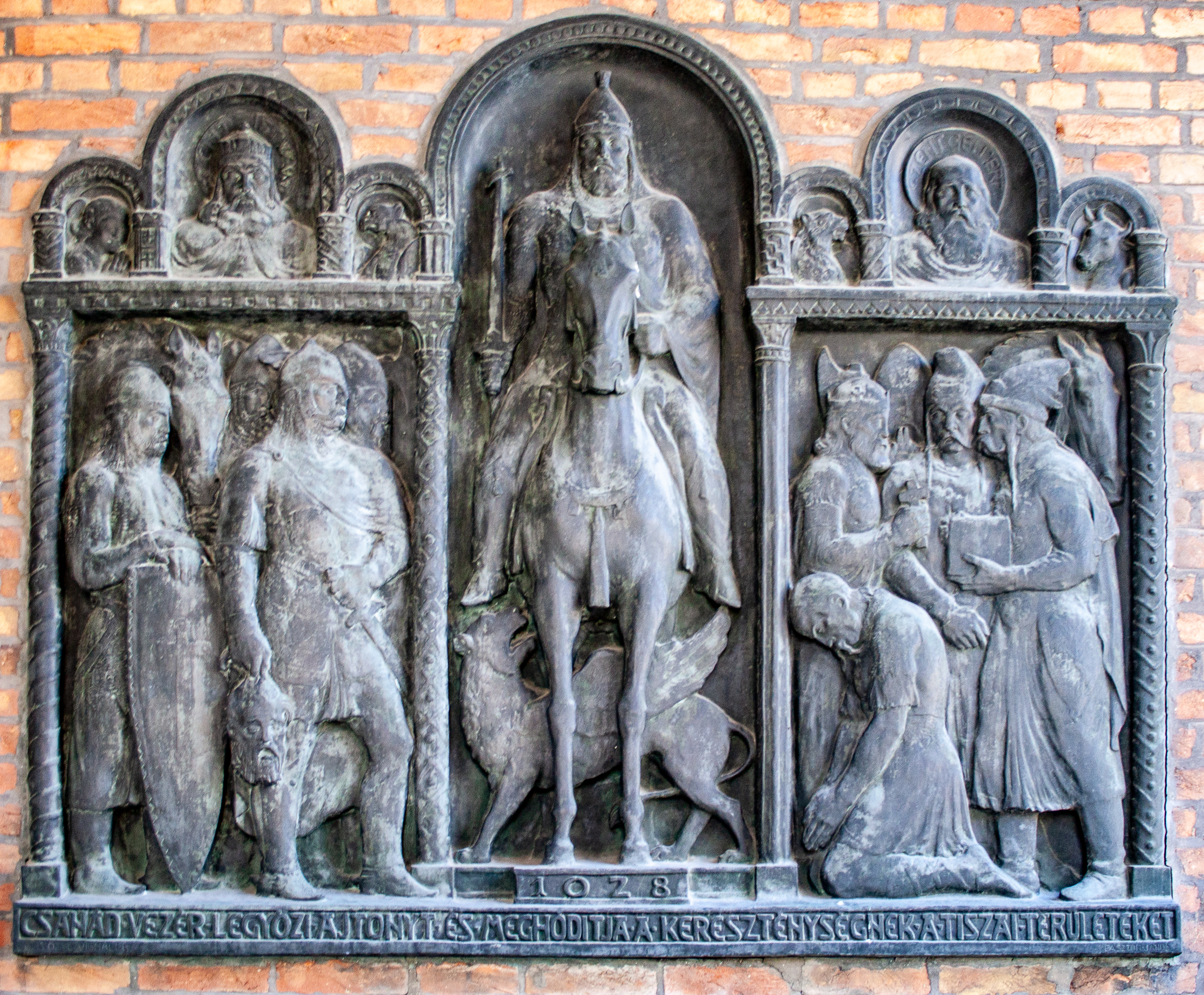
Relief commemorating Csanád's victory in 1028

King Stephen granted large estates to Csanád in the lands Ajtony had ruled. At urbs Morisena, which was given the name of Csanád, a Roman Catholic bishopric was immediately founded, and Gerard, who had hitherto lived as a hermit in the forest of the Bakony, was invited to be its first bishop in 1030. By that time Csanád had been baptized and become the head of the royal county (comitatus) organized around the fortress at Csanád. The Greek monks from there were transferred to a new monastery built by Csanád at Banatsko Aranđelovo. Gerard's hagiography implies that Csanád became head (princeps) of the royal court, which perhaps denotes the dignity of count palatine. The Gesta Hungarorum claims that Stephen I married off Ajtony's widow to Csanád (leviratus), while the hagiography adds that Ajtony had seven wives. Such nomadic customs were aimed at preserving the unity of the clan's wealth. All this means that Csanád – by marrying Ajtony's widow – also laid hands on the late chieftain's property. Historian Péter Galambosi argued that Csanád became a tribal chieftain, whose power was established as an example of the alliance between Saint Stephen and the tribal leaders who recognized his royal authority, within the framework of which the submissive leaders, who were baptized and contributed to the establishment of a bishopric in their territory, retained their territorial power.

Csanád was the ancestor of the genus Chanad/Sunad (Csanád kindred), the site of whose main holdings in Arad, Csanád, Krassó and Temes counties demonstrated a quite remarkable continuity from the 11th to 14th centuries.

== Sources ==
- Curta, Florin: Transylvania around A.D. 1000; in: Urbańczyk, Przemysław (Editor): Europe around the year 1000; Wydawn. DiG, 2001; ISBN 978-83-7181-211-8
- Curta, Florin: Southeastern Europe in the Middle Ages - 500-1250; Cambridge University Press, 2006, Cambridge; ISBN 978-0-521-89452-4
- Engel, Pál: The Realm of St Stephen: A History of Medieval Hungary, 895-1526; I. B. Tauris, 2001, London&New York; ISBN 1-85043-977-X
- Georgescu, Vlad (Author) – Calinescu, Matei (Editor) – Bley-Vroman, Alexandra (Translator): The Romanians – A History; Ohio State University Press, 1991, Columbus; ISBN 0-8142-0511-9
- Kristó, Gyula (General Editor) - Engel, Pál - Makk, Ferenc (Editors): Korai Magyar történeti lexikon (9-14. század) /Encyclopedia of the Early Hungarian History (9th-14th centuries)/; Akadémiai Kiadó, 1994, Budapest; ISBN 963-05-6722-9 (the entry “Csanád” was written by László Szegfű).
- Rady, Martyn: Nobility, Land and Service in Medieval Hungary; Palgrave (in association with School of Slavonic and East European Studies, University College London), 2000, New York; ISBN 0-333-80085-0
