= Péter Petrovics =

Hungarian noble, large estate owner (1486–1557)

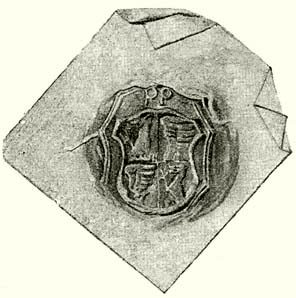
- Seal of Péter Petrovics

Ban of Lugos and Karánsebes
- Reign: 1544 – 1549
- Predecessor: Michael de Somlya
- Successor: John Glessan
- Born: 1486
- Died: October 1557 (aged 70–71)
- Religion: Calvinist

Péter Petrovics (Hungarian: Petrovics Péter; Serbian: Петар Петровић/Petar Petrović; c. 1486 – October 1557) was a Hungarian noble of Serb ethnicity from Banat, who was active in the 16th-century Transylvania. He was a major supporter of the Protestant Reformation.

== Biography ==
Peter's father was Mihailo (Michael) Petrović of Suraklin (Zraklin/Tisovica), a representative of Vrbas County in the Hungarian Diet of Rákos from 1505. Peter only had sisters, including Anna who was married to Sigismund Levai with whom she had several daughters and after the death of her first husband, she got re-married to Francis Kendi. Peter never married and left all his possessions to his sisters and their children. In 1543, Peter left one of his granddaughters, Catherine, five estates in Arad, Hungary.

Count Petrovics first appeared on the historical scene after the death of Jovan Nenad, on the side of John Zápolya, with whom he had familial ties. The death of his relative, King John, in 1540, brought Petrovics to the position of co-guardian of the minor John Sigismund, together with the new bishop of Oradea, George Utjesenović and that led to a long-lasting conflict between the two guardians that had profound implications for political and confessional life in the Hungarian Kingdom. In 1556, using Serbian troops, he attacked the units of Ferdinand I, Holy Roman Emperor and in doing so achieved the return to the Hungarian throne of John Sigismund Zápolya.

He had considerable wealth and power in the Eastern Hungarian Kingdom during this period, one of the kingdom's wealthiest landowners as a cousin and supporter of John Zápolya (John I), with a vast array of estates. He was a fervent supporter of the Reformation. A staunchly anti-Habsburg, pro-Ottoman magnate who was a councilor and guardian of John Sigismund Zápolya (John II), he was an adherent of Calvinism and used his power to be a major influence in the Reformation in Hungary, driving out altars and the portraits of saints from churches. A great statesman, he was also commander of Temesvár (today Timișoara, Romania) and ban of Lugos and Karánsebes under Queen Isabella. Petrovics also had large estate in Banat, around Temesvár.

He worked closely with Péter Melius Juhász, apostle and organizer of the Calvinist community in Debrecen. In November 1554 he employed famed Italian Lutheran theologian Francesco Stancaro as the personal physician at his castle until his death in 1559. Stancaro was actually a known influence on Debrecen clergyman Tamás Arany, who became involved in a heated debate with Petrovics's Calvinist associate Peter Melius Juhász over Antitrinitarian issues; but evidently this did not affect relations between Petrovics and Francesco Stancaro as he remained in his employ until his death. Petrovics had in the previous years been pressed to leave the southern region of Temesvár (today's Timișoara), and had settled in the northern country. Thus it was in this area that he used to support Calvinist doctrines. If he had stayed in his original power base, where earlier with his help the Lutherans had already organized the first Hungarian superintendencies, then it is most probable that the Hungarian Calvinist Reformation would have begun with the Temesvár synod.

Petrovics died in October 1557.
