= Ineu =

- Town
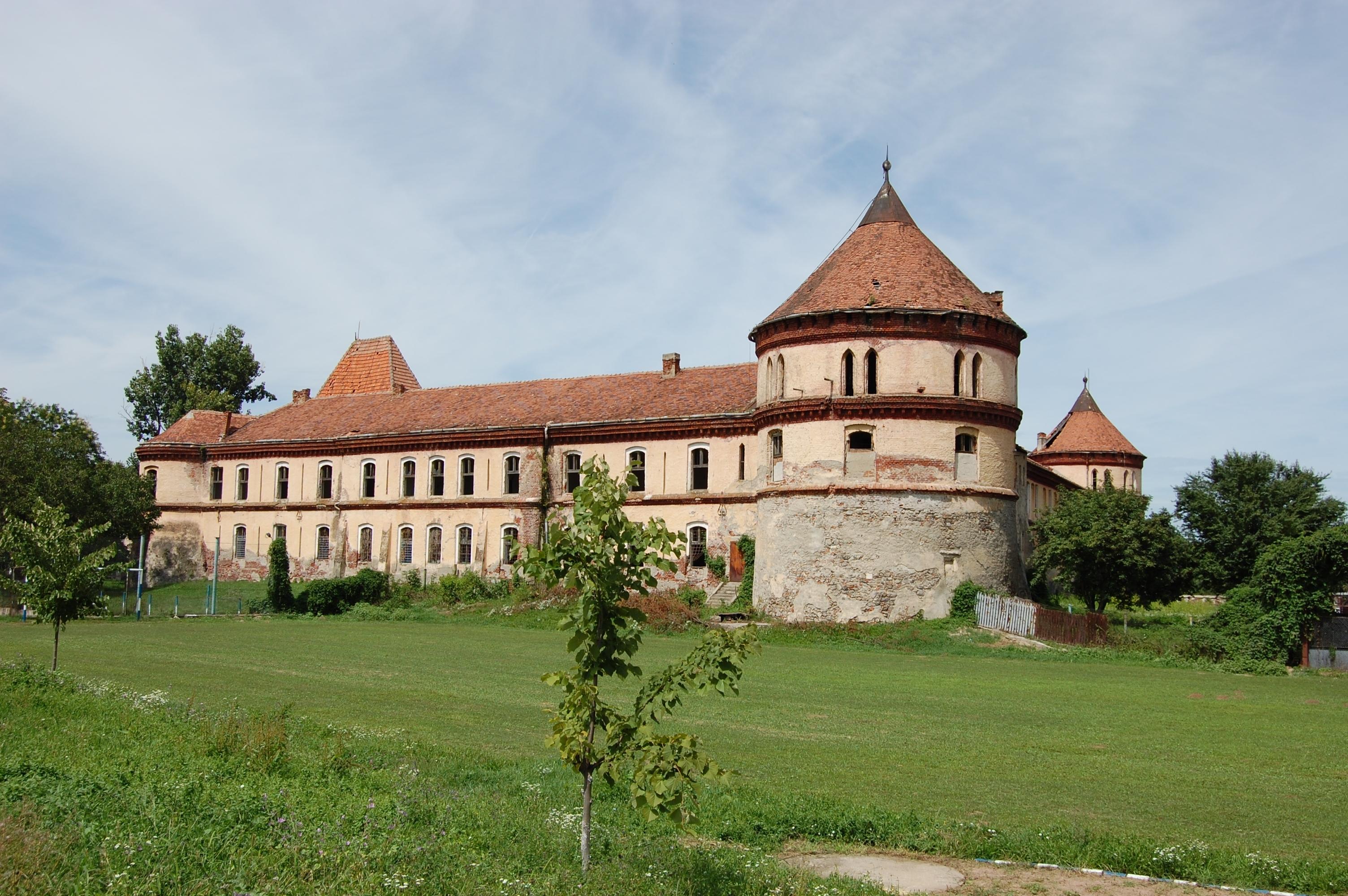
- Ineu Fortress

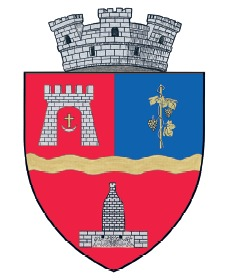
- Coat of arms

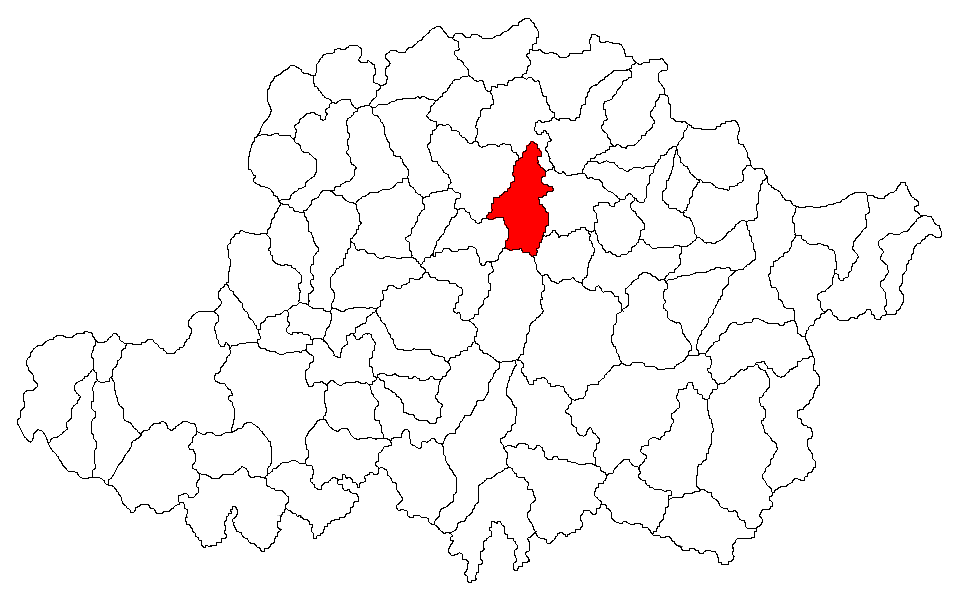
- Location in Arad County

- Location in Romania
- Coordinates: 46°25′33″N 21°50′13″E
- Country: Romania
- County: Arad

Government
  - Mayor (2024–2028): Călin Abrudan (PNL)
- Area: 116.62 km^{2} (45.03 sq mi)
- Elevation: 111 m (364 ft)
- Population (2021-12-01): 8,807
  - Density: 75.52/km^{2} (195.6/sq mi)
- Time zone: UTC+02:00 (EET)
  - Summer (DST): UTC+03:00 (EEST)
- Postal code: 315300
- Area code: (+40) 02 57
- Vehicle reg.: AR
- Website: primariaineu.ro

Ineu (Romanian pronunciation: [iˈnew]; Hungarian: Borosjenő) is a town in Arad County, western Transylvania, Romania. It is situated at a distance of 57 km (35 mi) from the county capital, Arad, and occupies a 116.6 km^{2} (45.0 sq mi) surface at the contact point of Crișul Alb Basin and Crișurilor Plateau. Ineu is the main entrance gate into the Zărand Land (Țara Zarandului). The town administers one village, Mocrea (Apatelek).

Ineu was first attested in documents in 1214 under the name "Villa Ieneu". It was a sanjak centre in the Temeşvar and Varat eyalets and it was known as "Yanova" during the Ottoman rule between 1564 and 1595 and again between 1658 and 1693.

== Population ==
Historical population
Year	Pop.	±%
1977	10,259	—
1992	10,915	+6.4%
2002	10,416	−4.6%
2011	9,078	−12.8%
2021	8,807	−3.0%
Source: Census data

At the 2021 census, Ineu had a population of 8,807. At the 2011 census, the town had 9,078 inhabitants; of those, 86.49% were Romanians, 6.57% Hungarians, 5.98% Roma, 0.34% Germans, 0.08% Slovaks, and 0.1% are of other or undeclared nationalities.

== Natives ==
- Mona Nicoară, film director and producer
- Radu Theodoru (1924–2025), writer, far-right politician and general

== Tourist attractions ==
The traces of habitation of this area are lost in the darkness of time. Archaeologists excavated artifacts belonging to the Neolithic civilization (axes with hole, flint tools, ceramics), to the Dacian civilization, to the Roman occupation (fortress lines, ornaments, weapons, millstones) and sources that attest the continuous inhabitance of these areas.

Ineu was the residence of a Romanian administrative unit called cnezat and was a strongly reinforced keep. Ineu's castle was mentioned as a fortress in 1295. Having a strategic position in the defense of Transylvania, the castle had a life full of vicissitudes. It belonged to the fortresses of John Hunyadi, then it was occupied by the Turks several times, being the residence of an Osmanli territorial unit until it was transferred in the possession of Michael the Brave. After it had been conquered by the Habsburgs, it became the headquarters of the frontier guard regiment.

These periods and events left their marks upon the town's development. After the year 1870, it was rebuilt from its ruins in a Neoclassic style with late Renaissance and Baroque elements.

It is a significant economic centre with a harmonious development of the three economic sectors. Besides, it is the main market town in the area (Țara Zarandului). The touristic potential of the town is high: Ineu's castle, the architectural complex of the town's historic centre, as well as the natural reservations are the main attractions worth visiting by the tourists coming to this region of the country.
