= Temeşvar Eyalet =

Administrative division of the Ottoman Empire from 1552 to 1716

Province of Temeşvar Eyâlet-i Tımışvar (Ottoman Turkish) Pașalâcul Timișoarei (Romanian) Temišvarski ejalet (Bosnian) Temesvári vilajet (Hungarian)
- Eyalet of the Ottoman Empire
- 1552–1716
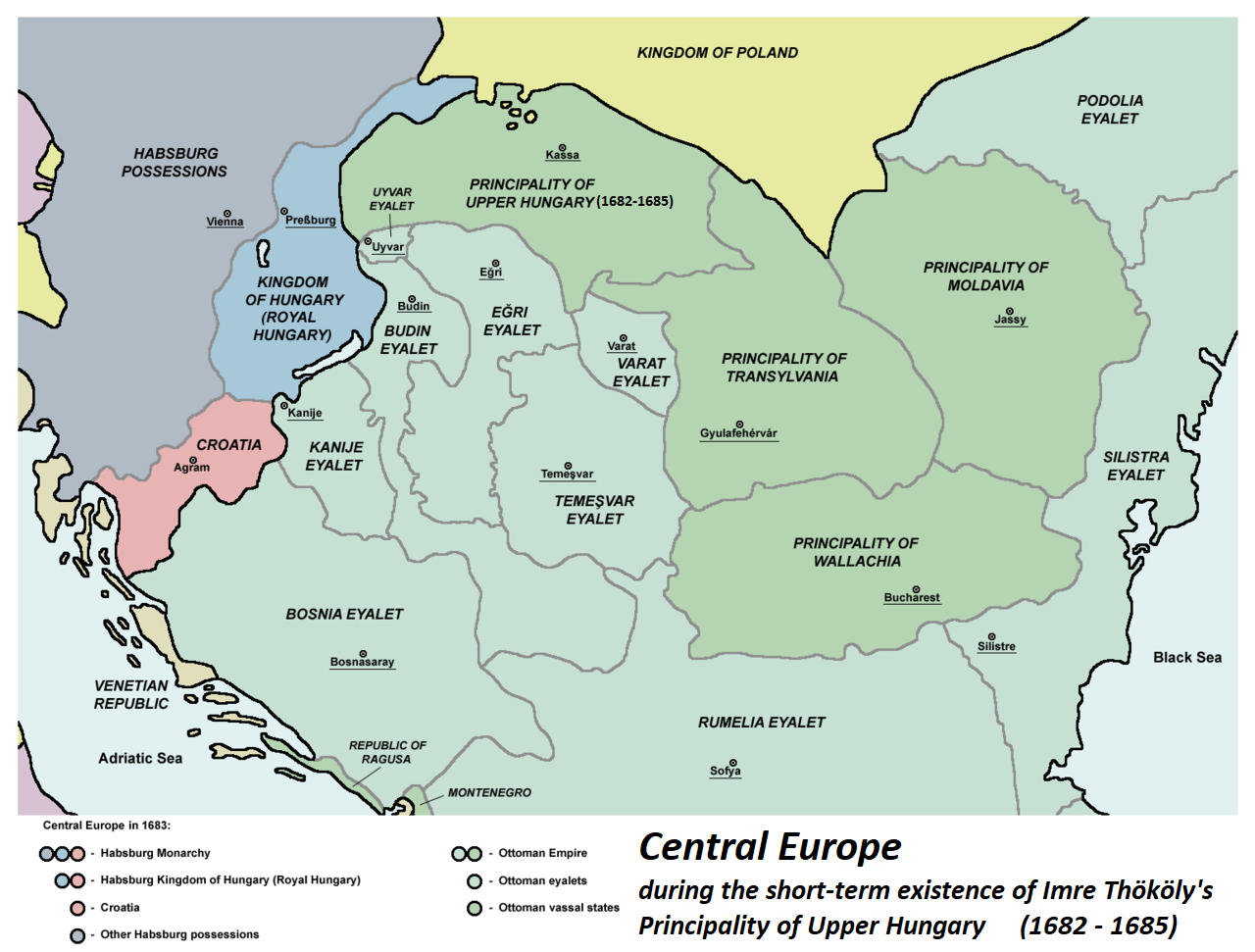
- The Temeşvar Province in 1683
- Capital: Tımışvar (Timișoara, Romania) 1552–1659 and 1693–1716, Yanova (Ineu, Romania) 1659–1693
- Area
  - Coordinates: 45°45′N 21°13′E
- History
  - Siege of Temesvár: 1552
  - Austro-Turkish War of 1716–1718: 1716
Preceded by	Succeeded by
Kingdom of Hungary; Banate of Lugos and Karánsebes	Banat of Temeswar
- Today part of: Romania; Serbia; Hungary

The Eyalet of Temeşvar (Ottoman Turkish: ;ایالت طمشوار Eyālet-i Tımışvār) was a first-level administrative unit (eyalet) of the Ottoman Empire. It existed from 1552 to 1716. Provincial administration was centered in Temeşvar (today's Timișoara) from 1552 to 1659, and again from 1693 to 1716. During the 1659–1693 interval, its second capital was Yanova (today's Ineu), and within that period, it was also known as the Eyalet of Yanova. The province was located in the Banat region of Central Europe. Besides Banat, it also included southern parts of the Crișana region, north of the river Mureș. Its territory is now divided between Hungary, Romania, and Serbia.

== Names ==
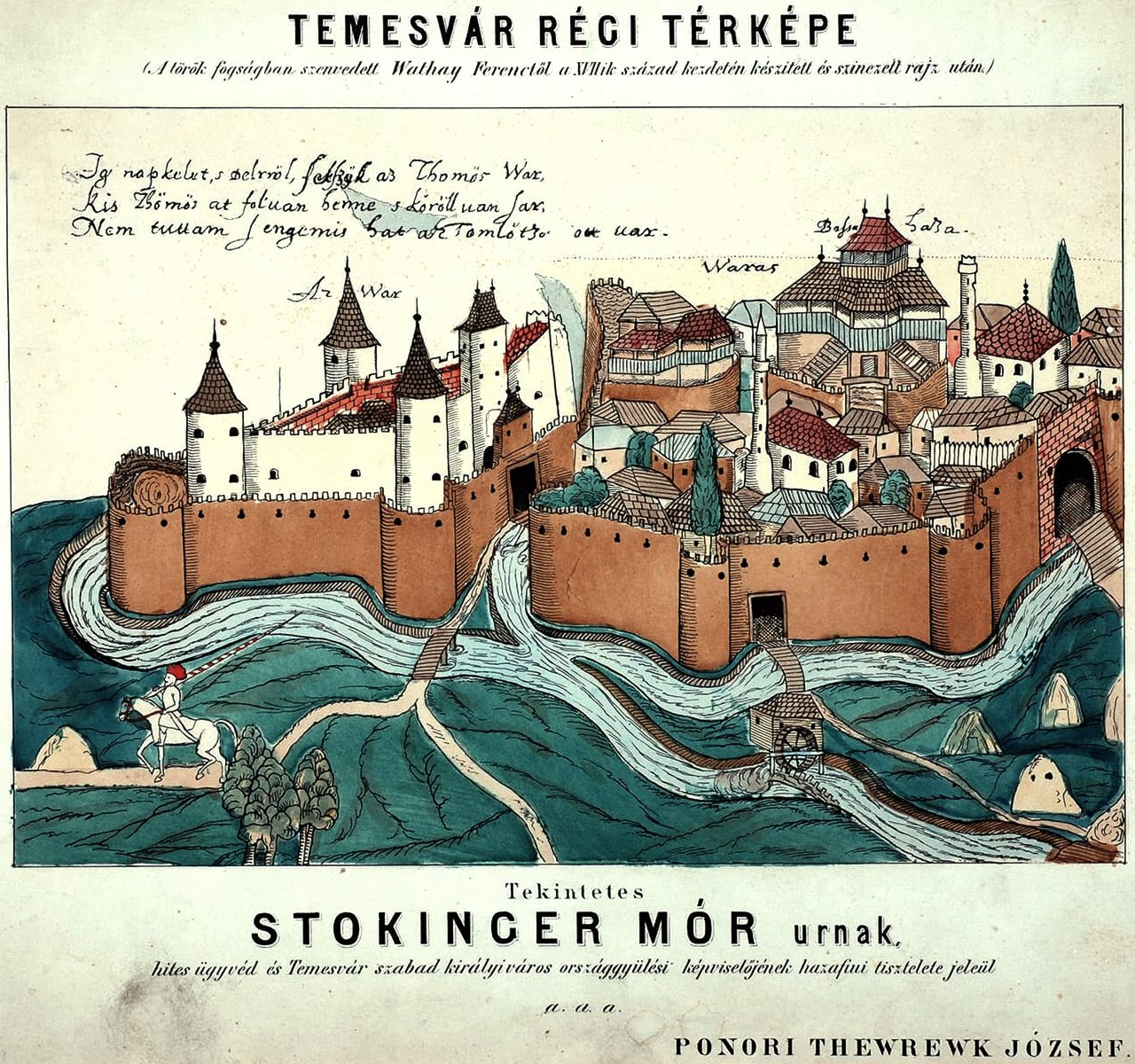
Ottoman Temeşvar in 1602

The name of the province in Ottoman Turkish was Eyâlet-i Temeşvar or Eyâlet-i Tımışvar (in Modern Turkish: Temeşvar Eyaleti or Tamışvar Eyaleti), in Hungarian was Temesvári vilajet, in Romanian was Eialetul Timișoarei or Pașalâcul Timișoara, in Serbian was Темишварски ејалет or Temišvarski ejalet. The province was named after its administrative seat, Temeşvar. The Turkish name Temeşvar is given after the Hungarian one, Temesvár meaning "Castle on the Temes" (River).

== History ==
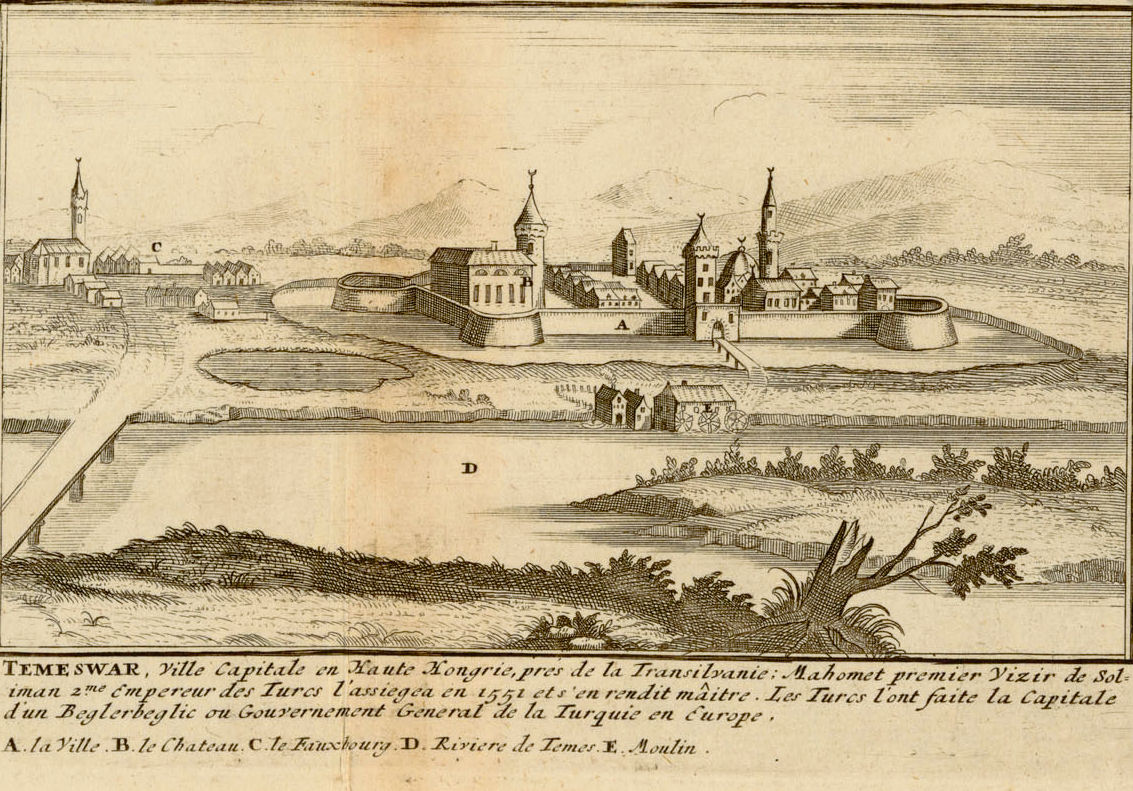
Mosques in Temeşvar in 1656

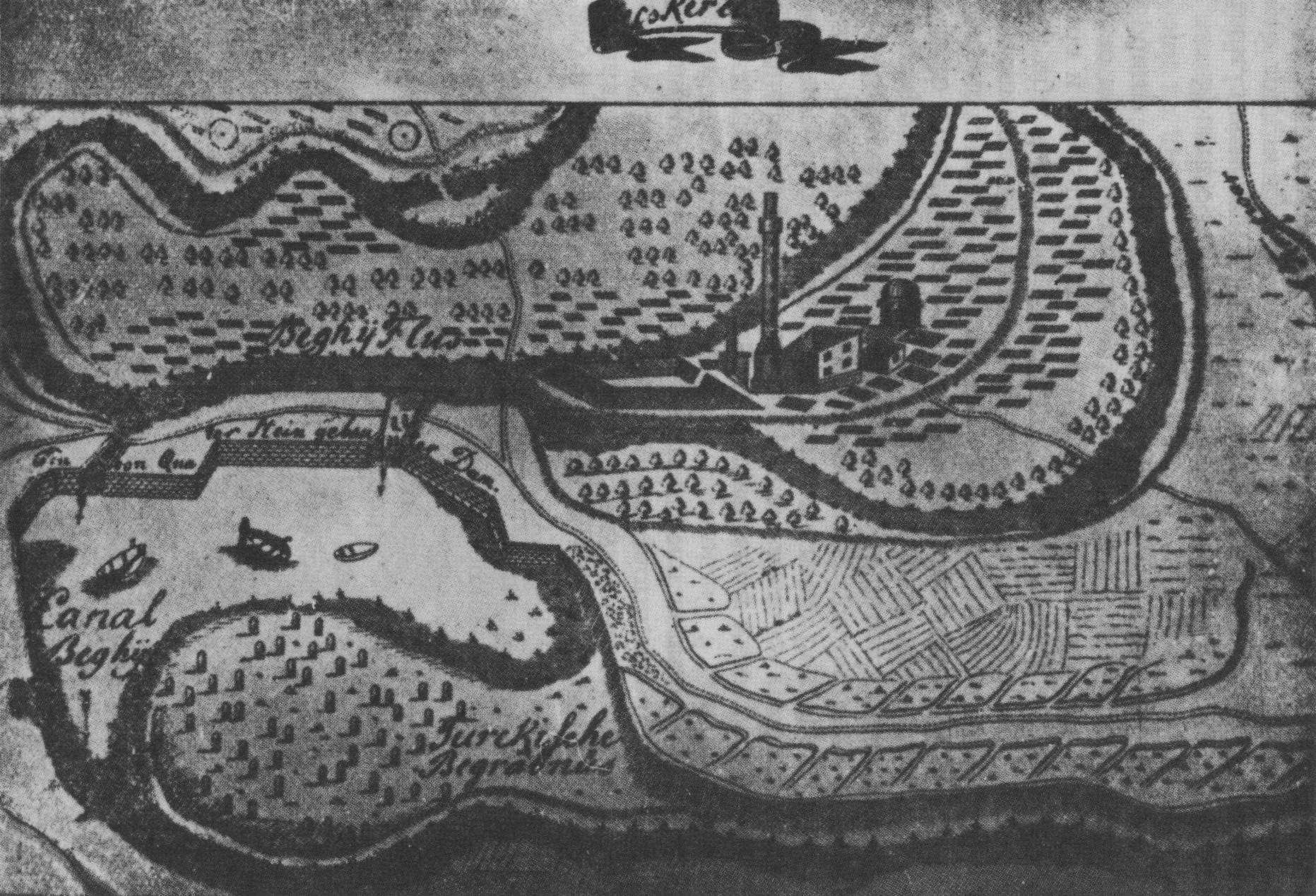
Ottoman Beçkerek (today Zrenjanin, Serbia) in 1697/98

Since the capture of Belgrade (1521), Ottoman forces have intensified their incursions towards Hungarian territories beyond the Danube, gradually establishing several posts on its left banks, while the Temes County and surrounding regions remained under the Hungarian rule. By 1536, the Banate of Lugos and Karansebes was established within the Eastern Hungarian Kingdom, as a military frontier towards the Ottomans. In the same time, local magnate Petar Petrović (d. 1557) emerged as a semi-autonomous governor of the region, balancing between Hungarians and Ottomans.

Upon the initial dissolution of the Eastern Hungarian Kingdom in the summer of 1551, much of its territories, including the Temes County and the surrounding regions, were integrated into the Habsburg Kingdom of Hungary, thus provoking the reaction of the Ottoman Empire, that invaded the region in the autumn of the same year, taking several cities, but not being able to conquer Temeşvar.

The Eyalet of Temeşvar was formed in 1552, when the Hungarian castle of Temesvár defended by the troop of István Losonczy was finally captured by the Ottoman troops led by Kara Ahmed Pasha on July 26, 1552.

The Eyalet was led by a vali (governor) or beylerbey (sometimes with position of pasha or vizir), whose residence was at the former Hunyadi Castle in Temeşvar (1552–1659 and 1693–1716), and also in Yanova (1659–1693).

It existed until 1716, when its territory was conquered by the Habsburg monarchy during the Austro-Turkish War (1716–1718). In 1718, the Habsburgs formed a new province in this region, named the Banat of Temeswar.

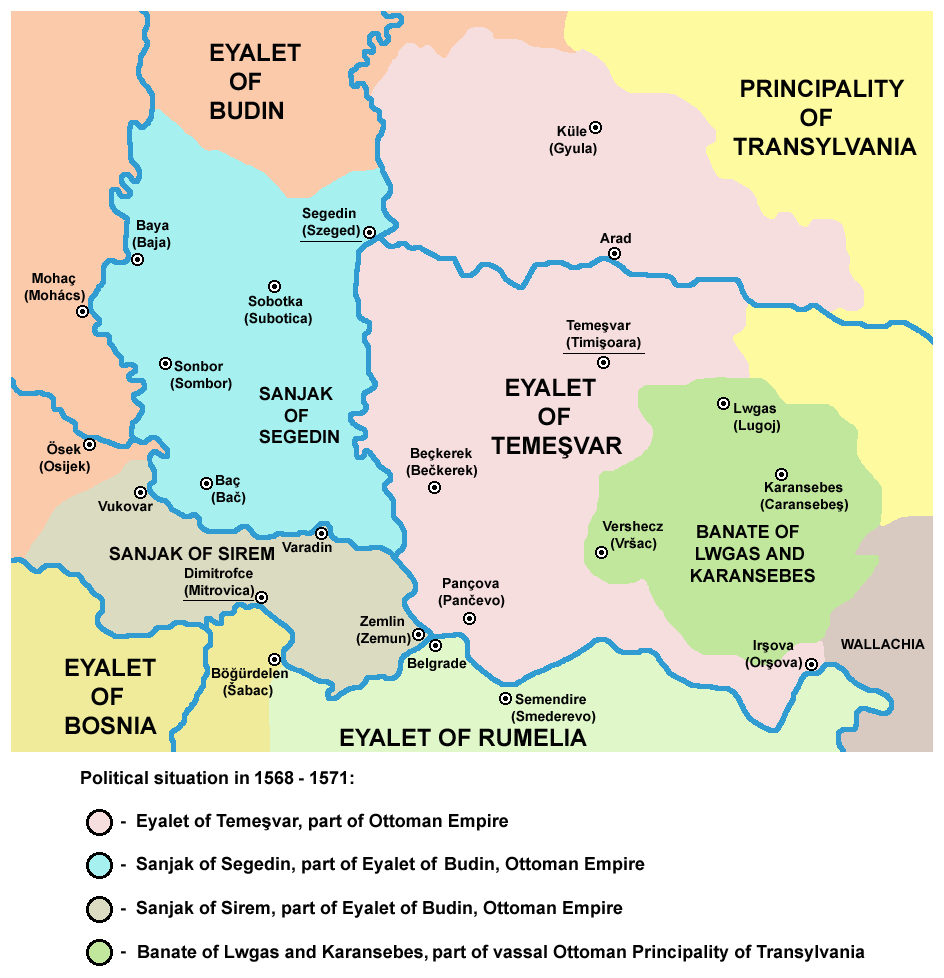
The Eyalet of Temeşvar and Banate of Lugos and Karansebes in 1568

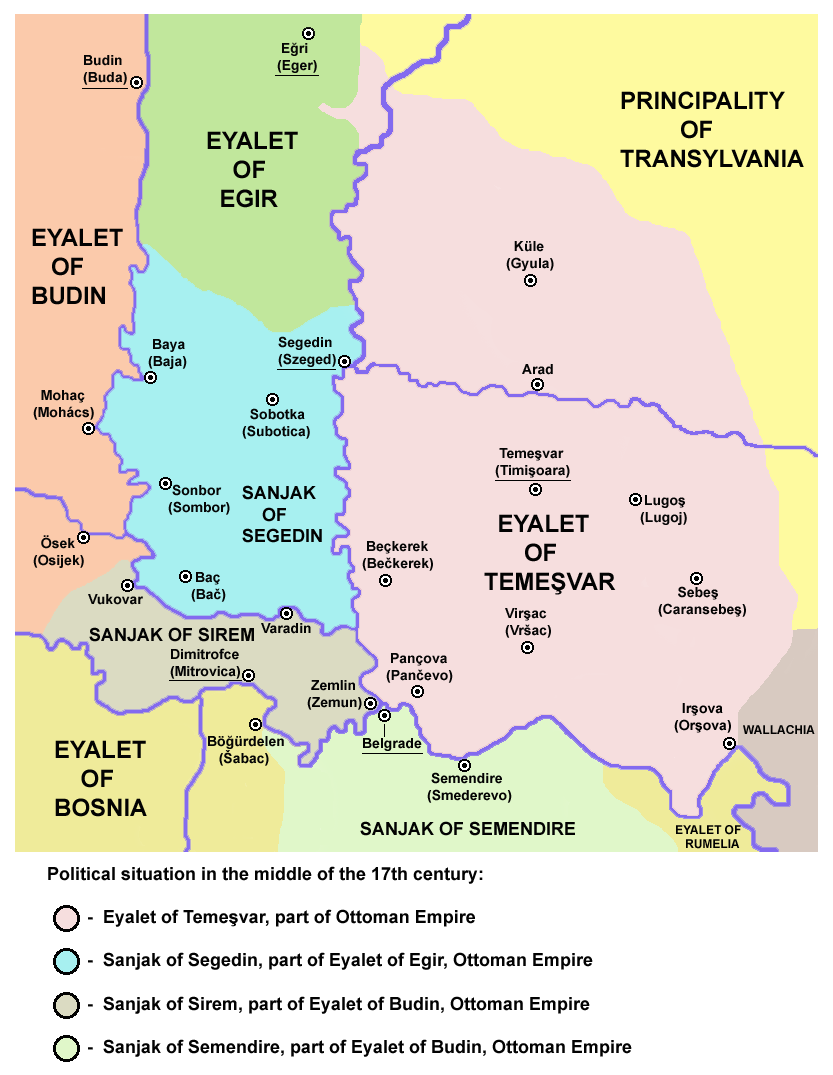
The Temeşvar Eyalet, mid-17th century

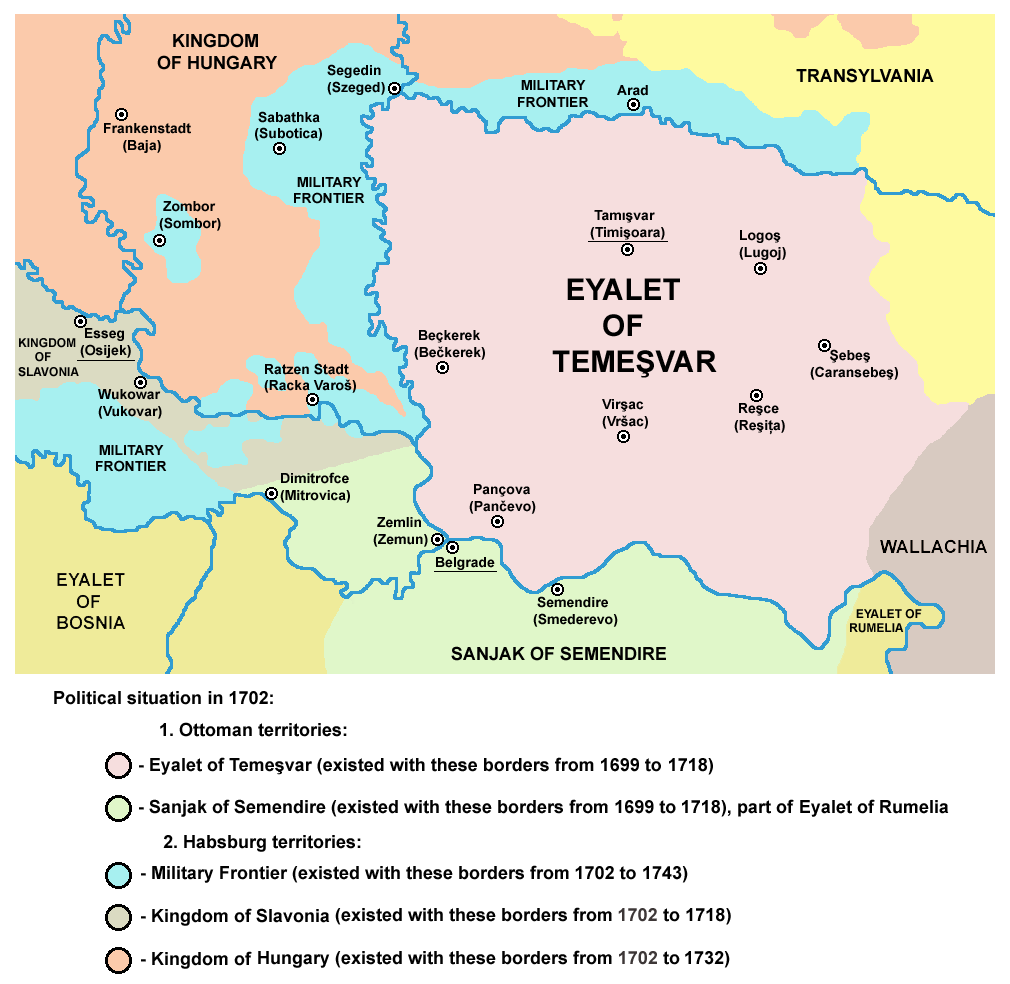
The Eyalet of Temeşvar in 1699

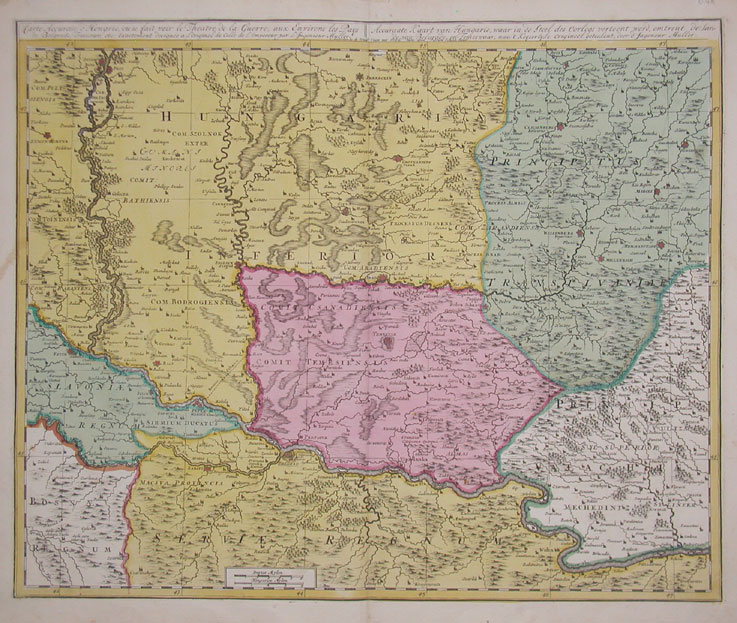
Map from 1700 (Eyalet of Temeşvar depicted in red)

== Demographics ==
Numerous Muslims mostly from the Balkans settled in the area, living mostly in the cities and associated with trade and administration. The countryside of the Banat region was mainly populated by Rascians (Serbs) in the west, and Vlachs (Romanians) in the east. Thus, in some historical sources, the region of Banat was referred to as Rascia, while in others as Wallachia. Temeşvar (Timișoara) was mostly populated by Muslims during Ottoman rule.

== Administrative divisions ==
Upon creation in 1552, the Eyalet of Temeşvar was divided into these sanjaks:

- Sanjak of Tımışvar (Timișoara)
- Sanjak of Arad (seat transferred to Güle (Gyula) in 1566, thus being renamed as the Sanjak of Güle)
- Sanjak of Çanad (Cenad, formed by expanding the Sanjak of Beçkerek (Bečkerek/Zrenjanin that was initially created in 1551)
- Sanjak of Lipva (Lipova)
- Sanjak of Modava (Moldova Nouă)

By the end of the 16th century new sanjaks were created:

- Sanjak of Pankota (Pâncota, created in 1565, seat transferred to Yanova (Ineu) in c. 1574)
- Sanjak of Orşova (Orșova)

During the 17th century additional sanjaks were created:

- Sanjak of Fenlak (Felnac)
- Sanjak of Çakova (Ciacova)
- Sanjak of Lagoş (Lugoj, created in 1658)
- Sanjak of Şebeş (Caransebeș, created in 1658)
- Sanjak of Pançova (Pančevo, mentioned in 1695)

Sanjaks of Güle, Yanova and Fenlak, and northern parts of the Çanad and Lipva sanjaks were transferred to Habsburg Monarchy after signing of the Treaty of Karlowitz (1699).

The eyalet consisted of five sanjaks between 1700 and 1701:
1. Sanjak of Tımışvar (Paşa Sancağı, Timișoara)
2. Sanjak of Çanad (Cenad)
3. Sanjak of Modava (Moldova Veche)
4. Sanjak of Segedin (Szeged)
5. Sanjak of Lipova (Lipova)

Note: Before the Treaty of Karlowitz, Sanjak of Segedin was part of the Eğri Eyalet. Most of this sanjak (including its administrative center, Segedin) was transferred to the Habsburg monarchy in 1699. Small eastern part of the sanjak on the left bank of the river Tisa remained within Ottoman Empire.

According to Sancak Tevcih Defteri, the eyalet consisted of six sanjaks between 1701 and 1702:
1. Sanjak of Tımışvar (Paşa Sancağı, Timișoara)
2. Sanjak of Çanad (Cenad)
3. Sanjak of Şebeş and Lagoş (Caransebeș, Lugoj)
4. Sanjak of Modava (Moldova Veche)
5. Sanjak of İrşova or Orşova (Orșova)
6. Sanjak of Lipova (Lipova)
The eyalet consisted of three sanjaks between 1707 and 1713:
1. Sanjak of Tımışvar (Paşa Sancağı, Timișoara)
2. Sanjak of Sirem (Syrmia)
3. Sanjak of Semendire (Smederevo)

== Governors ==
- Kazim-bey or Gazi Kasim-pasha (1552–1554)
- Hasan-pasha (1594)
- Sofi Sinan-pasha (1594)
- Hasan-pasha, the younger (1594)
- Mustafa Pasha (fl. July 1594)
- Dželalija Hasan-paša (1604–1605)
- Ahmed-paša Dugalić (1605–)
- Ibrahim-pasha (1687)
- Ibrahim-pasha (1701-)

== See also ==
- Ada Kaleh
- History of Banat
- Banat of Temeswar
- Banate of Lugos and Karansebes
- Early modern Romania
- Ottoman Hungary
- Ottoman Serbia

== Sources ==
- Bulboacă, Sorin (2011). "The Institution of Banat in the Banat of Lugoj and Caransebes in the XVIth-XVIIth Centuries" (PDF). Society and politics: Societate și politica. 51: 88–97. Archived from the original on 2020-11-25.
- Dabić, Vojin S. (2011). "The Habsburg-Ottoman War of 1716–1718 and Demographic Changes in the War-Afflicted Territories". The Peace of Passarowitz, 1718. West Lafayette: Purdue University Press. pp. 191–208. ISBN 978-1-55753-594-8.
- Dávid, Géza; Fodor, Pál, eds. (1994). Hungarian-Ottoman Military and Diplomatic Relations in the Age of Süleyman the Magnificent. Budapest: Loránd Eötvös University, Hungarian Academy of Sciences, Institute of History. ISBN 978-963-8312-31-0.
- Dávid, Géza (1994). "The Sancakbegis of Arad and Gyula". Acta Orientalia Academiae Scientiarum Hungaricae. 46 (1992–1993): 143–162. JSTOR 23658445.
- Dávid, Géza (1999). "The Eyalet of Temesvár in the Eighteenth Century". Oriente Moderno. 79 (18): 113–128. doi:10.1163/22138617-07901010. JSTOR 25817595.
- Dávid, Géza (2000). "An Ottoman Military Career on the Hungarian Borders: Kasim Voyvoda, Bey, and Pasha". Ottomans, Hungarians, and Habsburgs in Central Europe: The Military Confines in the Era of Ottoman Conquest. Leden-Boston-Köln: Brill. pp. 265–297. ISBN 90-04-11907-8.
- Fodor, Pál (1999). "Who should obtain the castle of Pankota (1565)? Interest groups and self-promotion in the mid-sixteenth-century Ottoman political establishment". Turcica. 31: 67–86. doi:10.2143/TURC.31.0.2004188.
- Káldy-Nagy, Gyula (2000). A csanádi szandzsák 1567. és 1579. évi összeírása. Szeged: Csongrád Megyei Levéltár.
- Kılıç, Orhan (1997). 18. Yüzyılın İlk Yarısında Osmanlı Devleti'nin İdari Taksimatı: Eyalet ve Sancak Tevcihatı. Elazığ: Şark Pazarlama.
- Kolçak, Özgür (2020). "Köprülü enterprises in Yanova ([Boros]Jenő/Ineu) and Varad ([Nagy]Várad/Oradea): Consolidating Ottoman power and accumulating family wealth (1657–1664)". Archivum Ottomanicum. 37: 69–86.
- Krstić, Aleksandar R. (2022). "The Emergence of "Sırf Vilâyeti": Serbian Migrations to the Territory of Banat by the mid-16th Century and their Results" (PDF). Migrations in the Slavic Cultural Space. From the Middle Ages to the Present Day. Łódź: Łódź University Press. pp. 95–111. Archived from the original on 2024-05-20.
