= Banate of Lugos and Karánsebes =

European polity

Banate of Lugos and Karánsebes Karánsebesi-Lugosi bánság (Hungarian) Banatul de Lugoj-Caransebeș (Romanian) Лугошка и карансебешка бановина (Serbian) Lugoška i karansebeška banovina
- Banate of the Principality of Transylvania
- 1536–1658
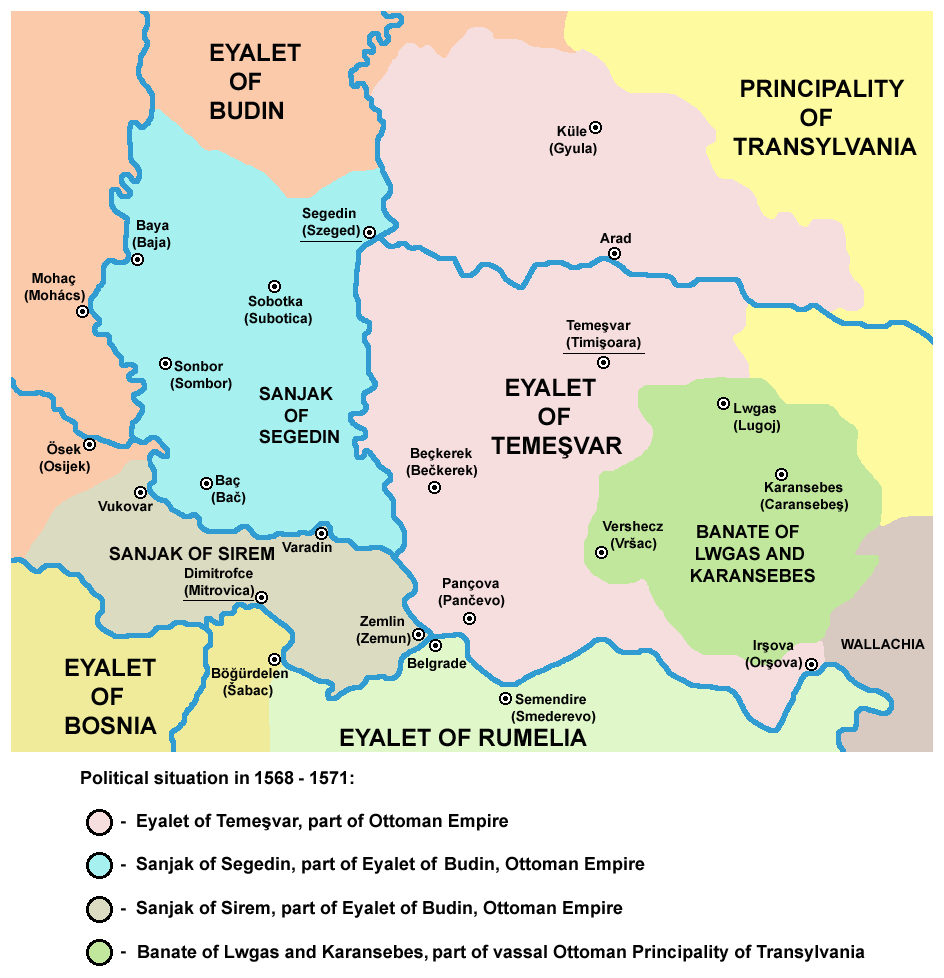
- Banate of Lugos and Karánsebes in 1571
- History
  - Established: 1536
  - Disestablished: 1658
Preceded by	Succeeded by
Banate of Severin	Temeşvar Eyalet
- Today part of: Romania; Serbia

Banate of Lugos and Karánsebes (Hungarian: Karánsebesi-Lugosi bánság, Romanian: Banatul de Lugoj-Caransebeș, Serbian: Лугошка и карансебешка бановина, romanized: Lugoška i karansebeška banovina) was an administrative and territorial entity (banate) of the Eastern Hungarian Kingdom and the Principality of Transylvania. It existed from the first half of the 1536, up to the 1658. The banate was organized as a militarized border area, created in order to defend the region from the advancing Ottoman Empire. Centered in cities of Lugoj and Caransebeș, it was encompassing the south-eastern part of the modern region of Banat, inhabited in those times by Hungarians, Romanians and Serbs.

== History ==
The Banate of Lugos and Karánsebes was formed gradually between 1526 and 1536, after the battle of Mohács, when the Banate of Severin was divided. Its eastern side, from Orsova (present-day Orșova), came under the jurisdiction of the Wallachian ruler. In the western part, this new political and military border entity was formed.

The Banate's Serbian ruler, Đorđe Palotić, provided material support for the Serb Uprising in Banat in 1594.

In 1658, the new Prince of Transylvania, Ákos Barcsay, ceded the region to the Ottoman Empire.

== Cities ==
The Banate of Lugoj and Caransebeș included the following cities:

- Lugos (now Lugoj)
- Karánsebes (now Caransebeș)
- Versecz (now Vršac)
- Boksánbánya (now Bocșa)
- Resicza (now Reșița)
- Karasevo (now Carașova)
- Mehadia

== Bans of Lugoj and Caransebeș ==
- Michael de Somlya (1536)
- Péter Petrovics (1544–1549)
- John Glessan (1552)
- Gregory Bethlen of Iktár (1563)
- Gabriel Bethlen of Iktár (1564)
- Stephen Trompa (1575–1577)
- Gregory Palotić (fl. 1594)
- Paul Keresztesy (1605–1606) and (1610–1613)
- Ákos Barcsay (1644-1658)

== See also ==
- History of Banat
- Principality of Transylvania (1571–1711)

== Sources ==
- Bulboacă, Sorin (2011). "The Institution of Banat in the Banat of Lugoj and Caransebes in the XVIth-XVIIth Centuries" (PDF). Society and politics: Societate și politica. 51: 88–97. Archived from the original on 2020-11-25.
- Krstić, Aleksandar R. (2022). "The Emergence of "Sırf Vilâyeti": Serbian Migrations to the Territory of Banat by the mid-16th Century and their Results" (PDF). Migrations in the Slavic Cultural Space. From the Middle Ages to the Present Day. Łódź: Łódź University Press. pp. 95–111. Archived from the original on 2024-05-20.
- Magina, Adrian (2013). "At the Border of Transylvania: the County of Severin/the District of Caransebeș in the 16th-17th Centuries" (PDF). Transylvanian Review: Supplement. 22 (4): 295–306. Archived from the original on 2024-05-23.
- Magina, Adrian (2016). "Border and Periphery: The Southern Frontier of the Medieval Kingdom of Hungary between Belgrade and Severin (14th-16th Centuries)" (PDF). Initial: A Review of Medieval Studies. 4: 141–164. Archived from the original on 2024-05-23.
- Țiăgu, Dragoș-Lucian (2016). "Between ephemeralty and Fiction. Addenda to the history of the Bans of Caransebes and Lugoj" (PDF). Banatica. 26 (2): 351–368. Archived from the original on 2024-05-23.
