= History of Christianity in Hungary =

The history of Christianity in Hungary started in the Roman province of Pannonia, centuries before the arrival of the Magyars, or Hungarians.

== Roman Pannonia ==
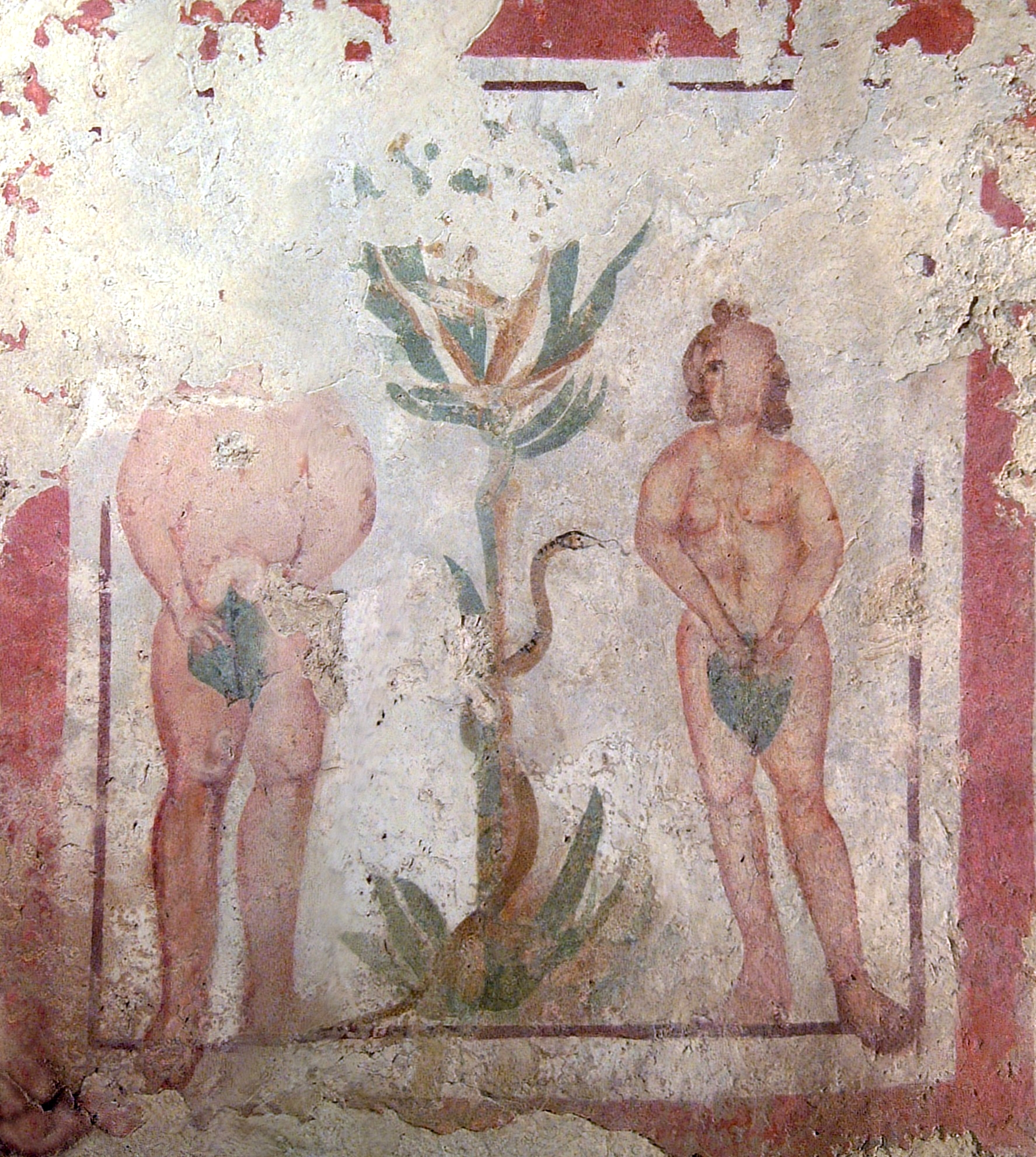
Fresco depicting the Fall of Adam and Eve in an early Christian crypt in Sopianae (now Pécs).

Celtic, Illyrian, Iranian and Dacian tribes inhabited the lands now forming Hungary in classical antiquity. The Romans started the conquest of the tribes of Transdanubia—the western region of present-day Hungary—in 35 BC. The region was incorporated in the Roman province of Pannonia in 9 AD, and split into two new provinces, Pannonia Prima and Valeria, in the 290s. The Pannonian natives' religion is poorly documented but the Romans erected shrines to their gods. A Christian presence can certainly be documented from the 2nd century. A decorated casket-mount depicting the marriage at Cana and other scenes from the Bible was unearthed in the canabae, or civil settlement, at the fort of Intercisa (now Dunaújváros). The first Christians were immigrants, particularly from Syria, Italy and Greece. Most of them had Greek names. One of the earliest tombstones with a Christian inscription—"Live in God"—was erected for Aurelius Iodorus, "a Greek citizen from Laodicea area", and his two children in the colonia, or city, of Savaria (now Szombathely). No Christian churches dated before the 4th century have been unearthed, implying that Christian liturgy was celebrated in private homes.

The Diocletianic Persecution did not severely affect the Transdanubian Christian communities. No local martyrs are known, although Bishop Quirinus of Sescia (now Sisak in Croatia) was publicly executed in Savaria in 303. Shortly after the Roman emperor Constantine the Great (r. 306–337) legalised Christianity in 313, Christian cemeteries, separated from the pagans' necropolises, were developing near the Roman towns and fortresses. The use of fibulae decorated with Christian symbols such as crosses or "Chi Rho"-monograms spread, although they do not necessarily evidence their owners' genuine Christian faith because Christianity became a state religion during this period. Although none of the towns of Pannonia Prima and Valeria are documented as episcopal sees, the historian András Mócsy emphasises that bishoprics must have existed in the provincial capitals, Sopianae and Savaria. Ambrose (d. 397), Archbishop of Milan, writes that Arianism—a doctrine condemned as heresy at the First Council of Nicaea—was spreading in Pannonia Valeria in the 4th century. The writer Sulpicius Severus (d. c. 425) adds that Martin of Tours (d. 397) who had been born to pagan parents in Savaria in 316 or 317 was expelled from the city by Arian clergy after he converted his mother to Nicaean Christianity.

== Early Middle Ages ==
=== Migration period ===
The Huns crossed the Volga River from the east and forced large groups of Alans and Goths to abandon their homelands in the Pontic steppes. Hun, Alan and Goth troops pillaged Pannonia for the first time in the winter of 379–380. The Romans allowed the Marcomannic queen Fritigil and her people to settle in Pannonia Prima after she converted to Christianity and convinced her husband to surrender to imperial authority around 396. In the early 5th century, the westward migration of peoples resumed, and Pannonia was invaded by Goths and Vandals. The violent incursions forced parts of the Romanized population to flee from Pannonia. Christians who fled from the town of Scarbantia (now Sopron) took Bishop Quirinus's relics from Savaria to Rome around 408. The Huns' center of power was transferred to the lowlands along the Middle Danube in the 420s, but their empire collapsed due to a rebellion by the subject peoples in 454. Thereafter, Germanic peoples were fighting for hegemony along the Middle Danube. By the early 6th century, the Gepids became the dominant power in the lands to the east of the river Tisza, and another Germanic group, the Lombards seized Pannonia. Native Christian groups survived the calamities. Anthony the Hermit who was born to an aristocratic family in Valeria left the province only after his parents' death sometime in the 5th century. In the next century, Martin (d. 580), who would become archbishop of Braga (in present-day Portugal), was born in Pannonia.

The Gepids' conversion to Arian Christianity started in the second half of the 4th century. The 6th-century Gothic historian Jordanes attributes their conversion to the efforts of the Arian Roman emperor Valens (r. 364–378). Archaeological finds proving the survival of Germanic paganism among the Gepids abound, (Note: Graves in Gepid cemeteries yielded amulets and pendants depicting Thor's hammer at Kiszombor and Csongrád.) but their leaders were buried with reliquiaries, indicating the veneration of saints. The Lombards came into contact with Arian missionaries in the 490s, but their pagan funerary rites survived. (Note: They placed food and drink in the graves and buried their warriors with their hunting dogs and weapons.) Arianism became their dominant religion in the 560s, which separated them from the natives who adhered to mainstream Christianity. Nicetius (d. c. 566), Bishop of Trier, addressed a letter to Chlothsind (d. c. 568), the Frankish wife of the Lombard king Alboin (r. 560–572) in the winter of 565–566, urging her to convert her Arian husband. The Avars—a powerful coalition of steppe peoples—invaded the Gepids' land and forced them into submission in 567. A year later, the Lombards voluntarily left Pannonia for Italy, accompanied by other groups such as Gepids and Romanized natives as well. The Avars were pagans who placed large quantities of grave goods in the graves, and buried their warriors together with their horse or its parts. The 6th-century Byzantine historian Menander Protector writes that the Avars swore by "God in heavens", whom the historian Walter Pohl associates with the Turkic supreme god Tengri. The Avars encouraged the Slavs to settle on the fringes of their empire, contributing to the Slavs' expansion in Central Europe.

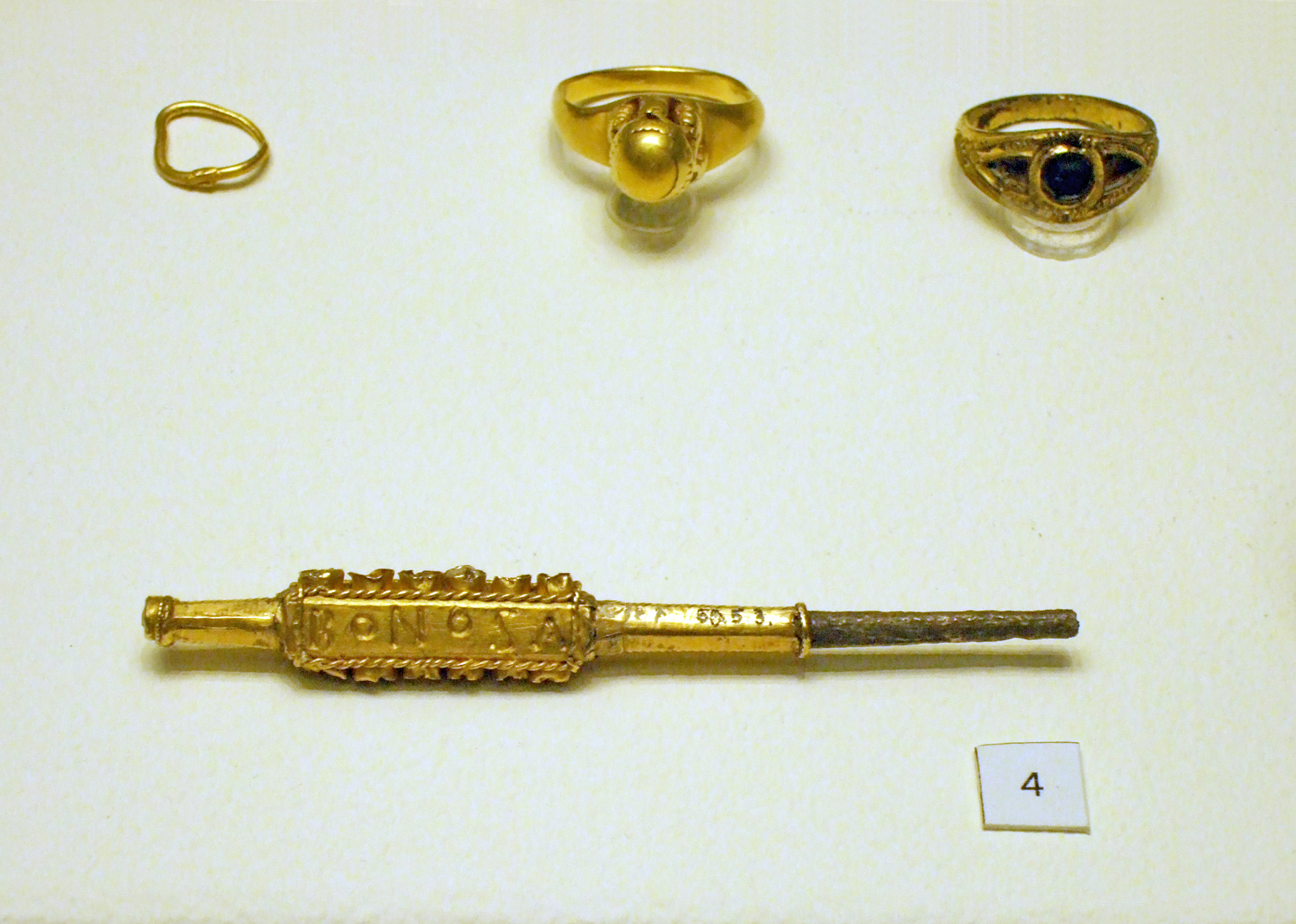
Silver garment pin with the inscription BONOSA from an Avar-age Christian cemetery near Keszthely.

A Christian community, the bearers of the Keszthely culture, flourished in the region of a former Roman fortress at Keszthely in the Avar Khaganate. The local basilica with three apses was used and possibly reconstructed in the second half of the 6th century. The community leaders were buried in the basilica or in the nearby cemetery. A wealthy woman buried in the cemetery wore a silver garment pin with the inscription BONOSA, tentatively identified as her name. The origin of the community is uncertain, with some scholars regarding them as the descendants of the local Romanized population, others identifying them as Byzantine prisoners of war, or a mixed population of local Christians and immigrants from various lands. Although the Keszthely fortress and the basilica were destroyed, most probably during an Avar civil war around 630, the community survived, developing new cemeteries in the region, but their distinctive culture quickly disappeared.

Columbanus (d. 615) was the first known missionary to be contemplating proselytizing among the Avars and the Slavs around 610. He quickly abandoned the idea after realizing that "progress in faith for this people was not ready to hand", according to his biographer Jonas of Bobbio (d. after 659). Around 700, Bishop Emmeram of Regensburg (d. 652) was planning to visit the Avars, but Bavarian officials dissuaded him from crossing the border. The Avars supported the opponents of the Frankish king Charlemagne (r. 768–814), provoking a Frankish military campaign in 791. A civil war broke out in the khaganate, and a high-ranking Avar dignitary, the tudun, converted to Christianity in the hope of Frankish support. In 796, Charlemagne's son, Pepin the Hunchback (d. 811) launched a successful military campaign against the Avars. The bishops who accompanied him held a synod on the Danube in 796, presided over by Patriarch Paulinus II of Aquileia (d. 802/804). They discussed the methods of the Avars' conversion, describing them as an illiterate and irrational people, and concluding that they could not be converted by force. The missionary territories were distributed between the sees of Aquilea and Salzburg along the river Dráva, with the lands to the north of the river coming under the jurisdiction of Salzburg.

Slavic tribes began raiding the Avar territories, forcing one of the Avar leaders, the kapkhan Theodore, who was Christian, to seek assistance from the Franks. He and his people were settled in the lands between Savaria and Carnuntum. The Avar khagan also converted to Christianity near Carnuntum on 21 September 805, receiving the name Abraham. A Byzantine list of bishoprics, compiled probably between 806 and 815, mentions the Avars among the Christian peoples under the jurisdiction of the papacy. The Avars' power quickly disintegrated and no Avar dignitaries were mentioned after 821. Cemeteries testify to the survival of the traditional Avar burial rites in southwest Transdanubia until around the middle of the 9th century.

=== Carolingian Age ===
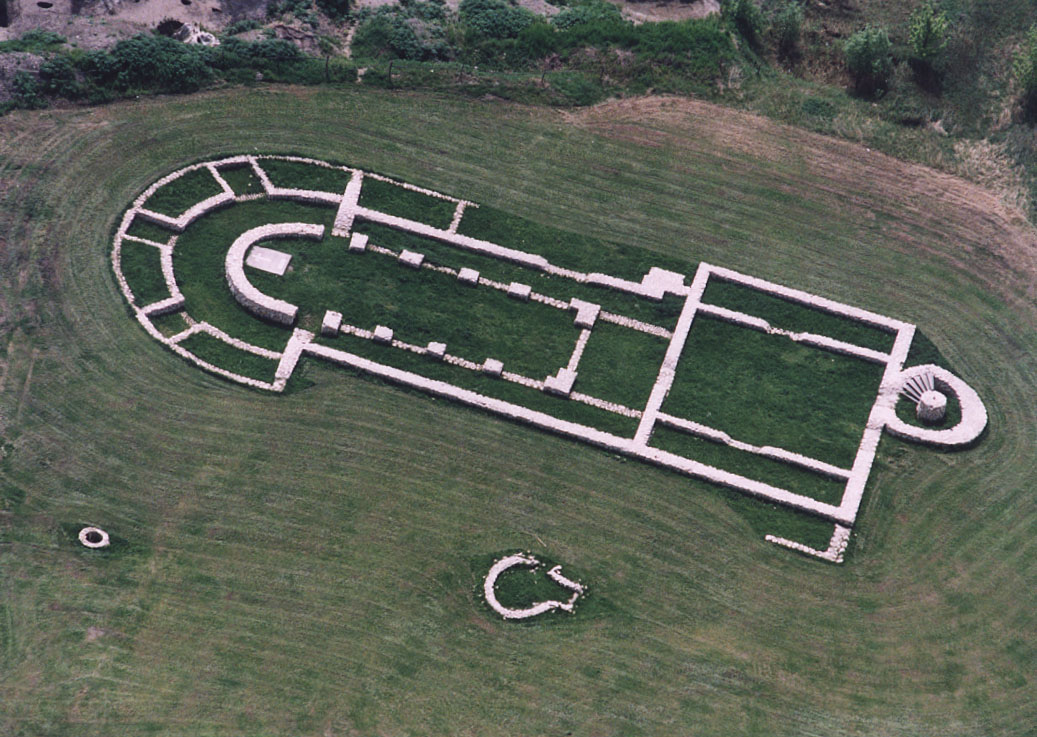
Remains of the 9th-century St Adrian Basilica at Mosapurc (present-day Zalavár).

Transdanubia was integrated in the administrative system of the Carolingian Empire between 796 and 828. The see of Salzburg ceded the lands to the west of the river Rába to the bishopric of Passau. Both prelates appointed evangelising bishops to direct proselytising missions in the region, but few archaeological finds indicate the existence of Christian communities during the first half of the 9th century. (Note: A chalice unearthed at Petőháza is one of the few Christian objects from the early Carolingian period in Pannonia.) A pagan aristocrat, Pribina (d. 861), whom the Moravians had expelled from his lands across the Danube, sought refuge in the Carolingian Empire in 833. He was baptised on the order of King Louis the German (r. 843–876) who also granted him estates on the river Zala. Pribina built a fortress, Mosapurc, in the swamps near Lake Balaton (at present-day Zalavár), and settled Slavic, Bavarian and Swabian colonists in his estates. A baptistery existed in Mosapurc already in the late 840s; Liupramm (d. 859), Archbishop of Salzburg, consecrated a church in the town on 24 January 850. The Saxon wandering priest, Gottschalk (d. 868), visited Pannonia in early 848, shortly before his teaching about predestination was condemned as heresy at a synod in Mainz. A three-aisled basilica, dedicated to St Adrian (d. 306), was built in Mosapurc around 855.

Pribina died fighting against the Moravians, and his son, Kocel (d. 874), succeeded him. Adalwin (d. 873), Archbishop of Salzburg, did not appoint evangelising bishops to Pannonia from around 863, likely as a consequence of a conflict with the last of the bishops, Osbald who twice approached directly the papacy for advice. Kocel met the Byzantine missionary brothers, Constantine (d. 869) and Methodius (d. 885), during their journey from Moravia to Rome in 867. Constantine—the future St Cyril—had constructed a special alphabet for the Slavic languages and developed a Slavic liturgy. Kocel learnt the new script and entrusted the brothers with the education of 50 disciples. In Rome, Pope Hadrian II (d. 872) approved the Slavic liturgy, and Methodius returned to Mosapurc in 869.

Kocel persuaded the Pope to appoint Methodius as bishop of the "see of St Andronicus" in Pannonia, which limited the jurisdiction of the archbishopric of Salzburg and the bishopric of Passau. Around 870, an unidentified cleric compiled a historical work, the Conversion of the Bavarians and the Carantanians to defend the interests of the Salzburg see. When Methodius left Pannonia for Moravia in early 870, Bishop Ermanrich of Passau (d. 874) arrested him, and a synod of the Bavarian prelates ordered Methodius' imprisonment for his interference in church affairs in Transdanubia. After Methodius's arrest, his pupils had to flee from Kocel's domains. Pope John VIII (d. 882) achieved Methodius' release early in 873, but Methodius could not return to Mosapurc because Kocel feared of the Bavarian bishops' revenge. After Kocel died around 875, Arnulf of Carinthia (d. 899) seized his domains. During his rule, the St Adrian Basilica was rebuilt in Mosapurc.

By the time the Conversion was completed, more than 30 churches had been consecrated by the archbishops of Salzburg in Pannonia. Cemeteries display the traits of Christianization of Transdanubia from the 830s. Commoners were still buried near sacred groves, but the orientation of their graves was consequently west–east. The offerings of food and drink almost disappeared from the commoners' graves in the 860s. The rulers' retainers were buried in new cemeteries near churches. The Conversion also refers to Christian Avars who paid tax to the royal treasury.

=== Pagan Magyars ===
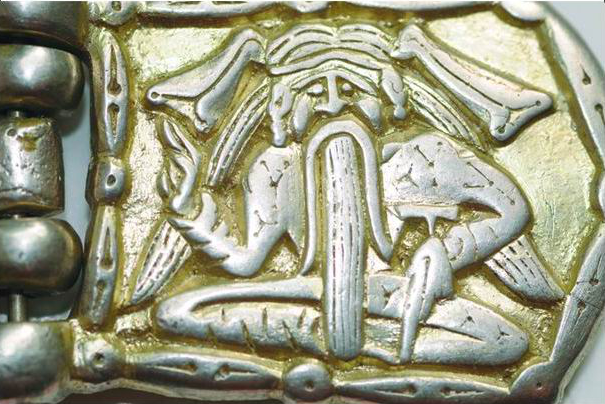
A belt buckle, unearthed in the valley of Inhul River, attributed to 9th-century Magyars

Coming from the region of the Ural Mountains, the Magyars settled in the Pontic steppes before the late 830s. They were among the subject peoples of the Khazar Khaganate for an uncertain period, but from the mid-9th-century they acted as an independent power. Ahmad ibn Rustah, Abu Sa'id Gardezi and other medieval Muslim geographers who preserved earlier scholars' records of the 9th-century Magyars described them as star- and fire-worshipers. Al-Bakri added that the 10th-century Magyars worshipped the "Lord of the Sky" whom modern historians associate with Tengri. Later prohibitions in Christian legislation indicate that sacrifices made at sacred groves and springs were important elements of the pagan Magyars' cult. The mutilation of corpses is well-documented in pre-Christian cemeteries, implying a fear of the return of spirits.

The Magyars came into contact with Muslims, Jews and Christians, but all theories on their influence on the Magyars' religious life are speculative. The hagiographic Life of Constantine mentions that the future St Cyril run into a band of Magyar warriors in the Crimea in 860. They wanted to kill him, but his prayers allegedly convinced them to spare his life.

The Magyars were regularly hired by their neighbors to intervene in their conflicts. The Byzantine emperor Leo the Wise incited them to invade Bulgaria in 894, but the Bulgarians made an alliance with the Pechenegs. The Pechenegs attacked the Magyars from the east, forcing them to abandon the Pontic steppes. They crossed the Carpathian Mountains and settled in the plains along the Middle Danube around 895. They conquered Pannonia, destroyed Moravia and defeated the Bavarians between 900 and 907. Theotmar, Archbishop of Salzburg, recorded that they destroyed Christian churches in Pannonia.

=== Towards the Magyars' conversion ===
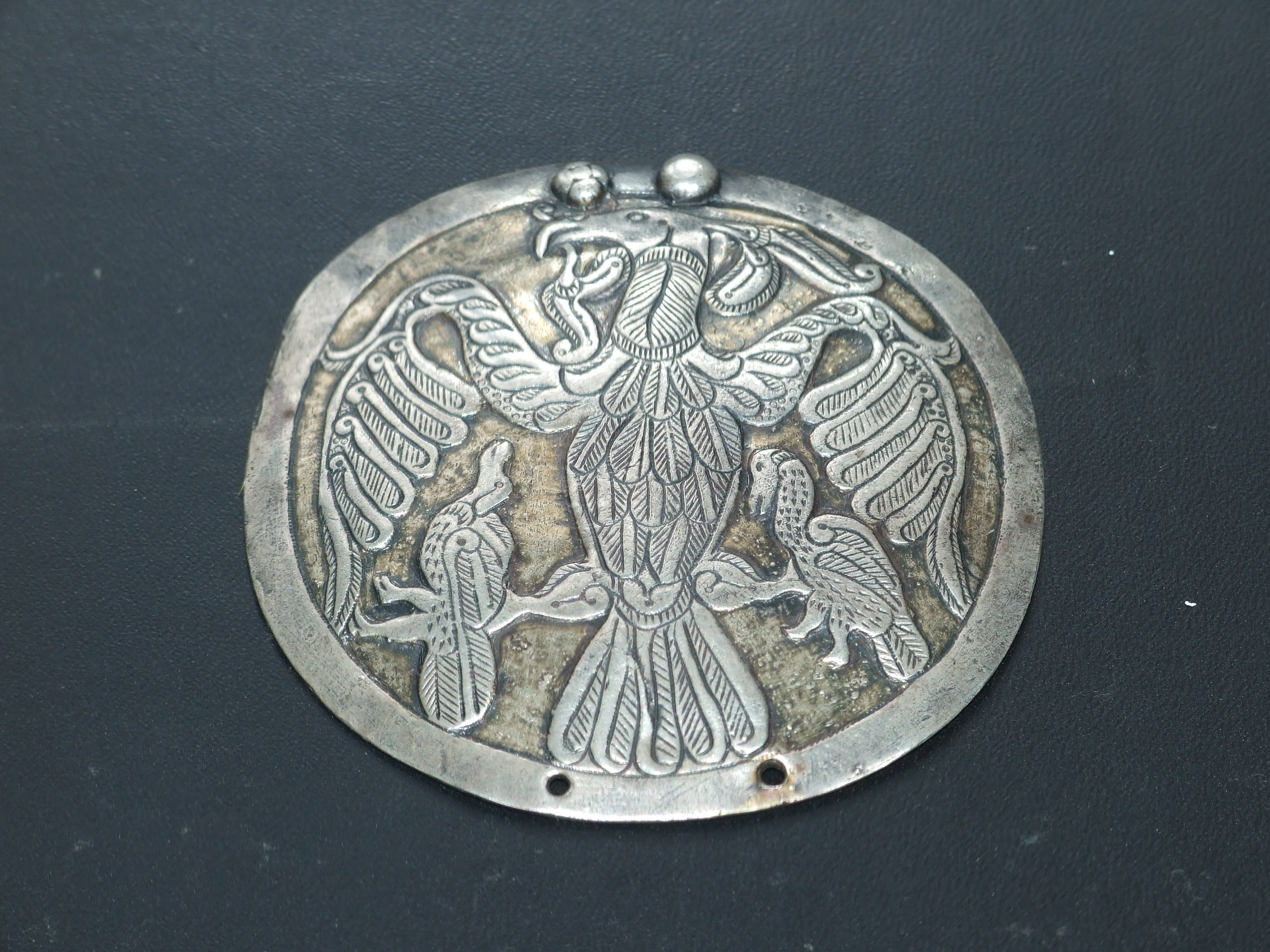
A turul (a legendary bird of prey) on a silver decorative disk from the grave of a 10th-century Magyar woman unearthed at Rakamaz.

Part of the local population survived the Magyar conquest and the Magyars captured Christians during their raids in Europe, but the Christian natives' and prisoners' influence on the Magyars' religious life is almost undetectable. Although significant elements of the Christian vocabulary of the Hungarian language are Slavic loanwords, these were not necessarily borrowed from local Christians as they may have also been learnt from Slavic priests during the period of the Magyars' conversion at the turn of the 10th and 11th centuries. (Note: Püspök ('bishop'), pap ('priest'), and keresztény ('Christian') are among the Slavic loanwords in the Christian vocabulary of Hungarian.) A sabretache decorated by a Greek cross, mythical animals and palmettes, found in a warriors' grave at Tiszabezdéd, may reflect Christian influence or religious syncretism, but the dead was put in the grave together with his horse, in accordance with pagan practices. The historian Attila Zsoldos concludes that the Christian natives and prisoners could hardly play a significant role in the conquerors' conversion.

A paramount chieftain (or grand prince), always a member of the Árpád dynasty, (Note: The Árpáds were believed to have descended from a legendary bird of prey, called the turul.) ruled the Magyars in the 10th century, but central authority was weak and the heads of the Magyar tribes pursued independent foreign policy. At least two of the Magyar chieftains started negotiations with the Byzantines and converted to Christianity. The first of them, the harka Bulcsú (d. 955) received baptism in 948, but he never became a devout Christian. The gyula Geula was baptised around 950. On this occasion, Patriarch Theophylact of Constantinople (d. 956) consecrated the monk Hierotheos as bishop of Tourkia (or Hungary) to accompany the gyula back to his domains in eastern Hungary. The Byzantine historian John Skylitzes (d. after 1101) claims that Hierotheos converted many Hungarians, but archaeological finds do not substantiate a mass conversion to Eastern Orthodoxy.

The Magyars' last pillaging raid to the west ended with their total defeat near Augsburg in Bavaria in 955. The defeat weakened the tribes which had been involved in the western raids, allowing the Árpáds to reinforce their position. A Byzantine victory over a coalition of Rus' and Magyar invaders at Adrianople in 970 also put an end to the Magyar raids against the Balkan Peninsula. Grand Prince Géza (r. c. 972 – 997) decided to establish close relationships with Hungary's western neighbors in the early 970s. According to modern historians, he either wanted to stabilize Hungary's position in a period of Byzantine–German rapprochement, or he realised that he could only be second in the Byzantine court behind the gyula. Pope John XII (d. 964) had already sent a missionary bishop, Zacheus, to Hungary in the early 960s, but the Pope's opponent, the Holy Roman Emperor Otto I (r. 962–973) captured Zacheus at Capua. A Benedictine monk, Wolfgang (d. 994), left the Einsiedeln Abbey to proselytize among the Hungarians in 972, but Piligrim (d. 991), Bishop of Passau, forbade him to leave his diocese, which may indicate a rivalry for the leadership of the missions in Hungary. In the same year, Emperor Otto I dispatched one Bishop Bruno to Hungary. Modern historians tentatively associate Bruno with "Bishop Prunwart" whom the necrology of the Abbey of Saint Gall credited with the baptism of Géza and many of his subjects. Bishop Adalbert of Prague (d. 997) also come to Hungary, but his mission was not successful, according to his nearly contemporaneous Life.

Géza stabilized central authority and promoted Christianity in parallel through warring against pagan chieftains, but contemporary sources indicate that he and his wife Sarolt (d. after 997), remained half-pagans. (Note: As Sarolt was Geula's daughter, she likely adhered to Orthodox Christianity, according to several historians, such as Gábor Thoroczkay.) The chronicler Thietmar of Merseburg (d. 1018) states that Géza offered sacrifices to pagan gods even after his baptism; and the missionary Bruno of Querfurt (d. 1009) accuses Sarolt of mixing Christian and heathen practices. The development of the church structure during Géza's reign is unknown. The earliest charter of grant to the Benedictine Pannonhalma Abbey states that Géza ordered its establishment. The question of jurisdiction over the nascent Hungarian church system led to a heated debate between the archbishopric of Salzburg and Piligrim of Passau.

== High Middle Ages ==
=== King St Stephen ===
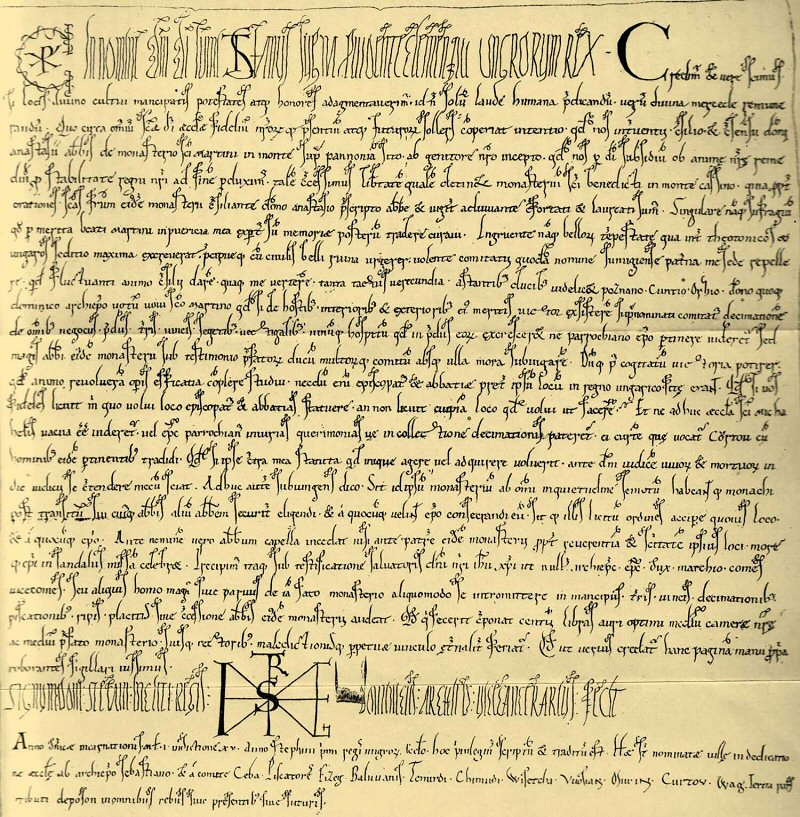
The foundation charter of Pannonhalma Abbey, signed by King St Stephen.

Géza died in 997, leaving Hungary to his son, Stephen (r. 997–1038). Born into paganism as Vajk, Stephen was baptised at the latest before he married, on his father's initiative, Gisela of Bavaria (d. 1065), a relative of the Holy Roman Emperor Otto III (r. 996–1002). Stephen's kinsman, Koppány, challenged his right to rule, but his army, mainly German knights, overcame Koppány. After his victory, Stephen requested a royal crown from Emperor Otto or Pope Sylvester II (d. 1003). (Note: The contemporary Thietmar of Merseburg attributes Stephen's coronation to Emperor Otto III's favour; the late 11th-century longer version of Stephen's first legend refers to papal blessing before the ceremony; and Stephen's early-12th-century official hagiography writes that Stephen received the crown from the papacy.) His request was granted and he was crowned the first king of Hungary on 25 December 1000 or 1 January 1001. During his reign, the Christianisation of Hungary accelerated, and the influence of Eastern Orthodoxy declined as he preferred western clergy.

Stephen established at least eight Roman Catholic bishoprics and six Benedictine monasteries. (Note: The longer version of Stephen's first legend attributes the establishment of ten dioeceses to Stephen, whereas a later source writes of the foundation of twelve bishoprics during Stephen's reign, but according to modern scholarly consensus, only eight dioceses can certainly be traced back to the early 11th century.) Thietmar of Merseburg writes that the first bishoprics had been set up already before Stephen's coronation. According to Thoroczkay, the dioceses of Veszprém and Győr are the most likely candidates. (Note: Zsoldos adds that Veszprém may have been the usual seat of a missionary bishop already under Géza.) The Hungarian Church gained independence of the German prelates with the establishment of the Archbishopric of Esztergom in 1001. By the end of Stephen's reign, further bishoprics were founded at Kalocsa, in Transylvania, at Pécs, Eger and Csanád (present-day Cenad in Romania). The establishment of the dioceses sometimes reflected Stephen expansion: the Bishopric of Transylvania was founded after he annexed the lands ruled by his maternal uncle Geula the Younger, whereas the Diocese of Csanád was set up after his troops defeated Ajtony, the ruler of the lands now known as the Banat (now mainly in Serbia and Romania). By 1050, Kalocsa was the seat of a second archbishopric, but it is unclear whether Kalocsa was originally established as a bishopric, or an archbishopric without suffragan bishops. Stephen issued the foundation charter of Pannonhalma Abbey, and established the abbeys at Pécsvárad, Zalavár, Bakonybél, Somlóvásárhely, and Zobor (now in Nitra in Slovakia).

The Christianisation of the population required the application of violence. Bruno of Querfurt witnessed how Christian soldiers blinded Black Hungarians—an ethnic group in southern Hungary—to enforce their baptism. Stephen's first laws ordered the observation of feast days and fasts and the punishment of those who disturbed the mass by murmuring. The pagans were regularly baptized before their formal education of the Christian doctrines began. According to early-11th-century sources, Slavic, German and Italian priests were proselytizing among the pagan Hungarians. Bruno of Querfurt met with Adalbert of Prague's tutor, Radla (d. after 1000), and one of Adalbert's disciples, Astrik (d. c. 1030/1040), in Hungary. A Venetian monk, Gerard (d. 1046), who was consecrated the first bishop of Csanád in 1030, proselytized in the Banat. The longer version of his Life describes him preaching among the pagan Hungarians who were brought to him by royal officials, with seven monks acting as his interpreters. The first priests were foreigners. Bonipert (d. after 1036), the first bishop of Pécs, came from France or Lombardy; one of his priests, Hilduin, was a Frenchman; the hermits Zoerard (d. c. 1009) and Benedict (d. c. 1012) were born in Poland or Istria. The first native cleric known by name, Maurus (d. c. 1075), was consecrated as bishop of Pécs in 1036. Hungarian liturgy followed German, Lotharingian and northern Italian patterns.

Stephen's second law book prescribed that every ten villages were to build a church, but the development of the parish system lasted for centuries. In addition to secular clerics, monks were allowed to publicly preach and confer sacraments to the people. The earliest churches, often made of wood or wattle-and-daub, were built in or near fortresses. Stone churches mainly followed Italian patterns as it is demonstrated by the Acanthus spinosa carved on the chapiters of the columns in the Romanesque Veszprém Cathedral. Latin literacy started in Hungary during Stephen's reign. Bishop Fulbert of Chartres sent a copy of Priscian's Institutes of Grammar—a popular handbook of Latin—to Bonipert of Pécs around 1020. An unidentified foreign cleric wrote a king's mirror, known as Admonitions, for Stephen's son and heir, Emeric, in the 1020s. Gerard of Csanád completed his Biblical commentary entitled Deliberatio supra hymnum trium puerorum ('Meditation of the Hymn of Three Young Men') in Hungary.

Orthodox communities existed in Stephen's kingdom. He (or his father) established a monastery for Byzantine nuns in Veszprémvölgy. One of his opponents, Ajtony, who ruled the Banat, converted to Orthodoxy and established a monastery for Greek monks at his seat. After Stephen's troops conquered Ajtony's domains, the monks were transferred to a new monastery, built for them. Archaeologists assume that pectoral crosses found in graves reflect the dead's Orthodox faith, although such objects may have also been worn as jewellry. Byzantine documents made sporadic references to "metropolitan bishops of Tourkia" till the end of the 11th century. The Admonitions and Gerard's Deliberatio mention anti-Trinitarian groups, presenting them as a serious problem for Catholic missions in Hungary. Gerard described them as heretics who denied the resurrection of the dead and threatened the Church's position with the assistance of the "followers of Methodius". Modern historians propose that these "heretics" were Bogumil refugees from Bulgaria or local Christians converted by non-Catholic missionaries.

=== Revolts and consolidation ===
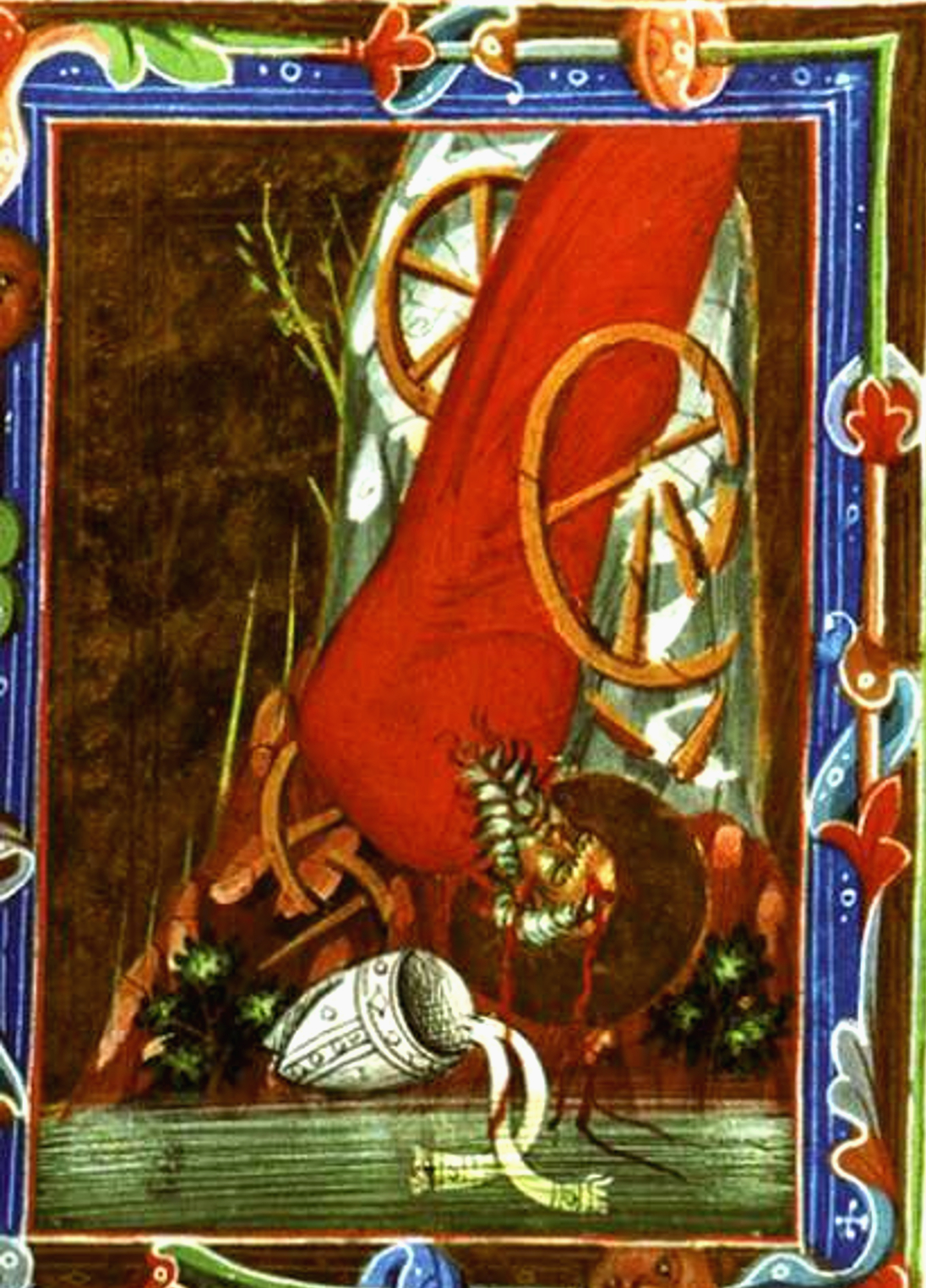
Martyrdom of Bishop Gerard of Csanád.

Stephen I who survived his son appointed his sister's son, the Venetian Peter Orseolo as his heir. To secure Peter's position, Stephen ordered the mutilation of his cousin, Vazul, who inclined towards paganism. Vazul's three sons, Levente, Andrew and Béla, were forced into exile. Peter succeeded Stephen in 1038. He distrusted the native aristocrats and replaced them with Germans and Italians. The neglected lords dethroned him and elected one of their number, Samuel Aba, king, but the Holy Roman Emperor, Henry III, invaded Hungary and restored Peter. Peter swore fealty to the Emperor and introduced Bavarian laws.

Peter remained unpopular and a group of discontented aristocrats offered the throne to Vazul's exiled sons in 1046. Before the three dukes returned to Hungary, a popular uprising began. The Annales Altahenses described the rebels as pagans who murdered clerics and foreigners. Bishop Gerald of Csanád, thrown from the hill now bearing his name to the Danube, was one of their victims. They captured and blinded the King, paving the way for Vazul's sons. The eldest of them, Levente, whom the Hungarian chronicles described as a pagan, died unexpectedly. The three bishops who survived the uprising crowned his Christian younger brother, Andrew, king. The Annales Altahenses accused him of anti-Christian acts during the revolt, but as king he restored Stephen I's decrees, outlawing paganism. Andrew I was dethroned by his brother, Béla. Béla I held a general assembly, summoning two elders from each village to Székesfehérvár in 1061. The assembled commoners put pressure on him to expel the priests from the country, but he dissolved the meeting by force.

Dynastic conflicts continued, but the position of Christianity consolidated in Hungary. Archaeological finds reveal the general adoption of Christian customs by around 1100. Grave goods disappeared and churches were built in pagan cemeteries. New Benedictine (Note: Tihany Abbey was founded by Andrew I in 1055, Szekszárd Abbey by Béla I in 1061, and Somogyvár Abbey by Ladislaus I in 1091.) and Orthodox (Note: Andrew I established monasteries for Orthodox monks at Tihany and Visegrád.) monasteries were established by the monarchs. Otto from the Győr kindred was the first aristocrat to found a Benedictine family monastery at Zselicszentjakab in 1061. Cathedral chapters became important institutions of education. The parishes in the dioceses were grouped into deaneries, each headed by a senior cleric, by around 1100.

Béla I's son, Ladislaus I, took Draconian measures for the protection of property rights, even ignoring the idea of church asylum. His laws also dealt with the local Muslim and Jewish communities. He forbade Muslims who had converted to Christianity to return to their old faith and ordered the Jews to abandon their Christian wives and to dismiss their Christian servants. Ladislaus supported Popes Victor III and Urban II against Antipope Clement III during the first phase of the Investiture Controversy. He procured the canonization of the first Hungarian saints—King Stephen I, Prince Emeric, Bishop Gerard and the hermits Zoerard and Benedict—in 1083. He summoned the Hungarian prelates to synod at Szabolcs in 1091. The synod forbade the village communities to abandon the land where their church stood, but authorized the villagers to elect one of their number to represent them at the Sunday mass if their village was far away from the church. The synod allowed the married priests to live with their wives in clear contradiction with the idea of clerical celibacy, promoted by the Gregorian Reform.

Ladislaus I's nephew and successor, Coloman the Learned, had to deal with the problems that the armies of the First Crusade caused during their march across Hungary towards the Holy Land in 1096. He defeated and massacred two crusader hordes to prevent their pillaging raids, but allowed Godfrey of Bouillon and his troops to cross Hungary after Godfrey offered his brother, Baldwin, as a hostage to guarantee his troops' good conduct. Coloman renounced the right of appointing the bishops, but in practice the cathedral chapters continued to elect the monarchs' nominees as bishops. His decrees toned down the harshness of his predecessors' laws. The preamble to his law-code described Hungary as a fully converted Christian realm, but his decree ordering burials in graveyards shows that this was not a general practice. He ordered the Muslims to build Christian churches, to eat pork and to marry off their daughters to Christians, showing his intention to assimilate the local Muslim communities. The Esztergom synod of the Hungarian prelates prohibited the monks from preaching, baptizing and offering absolution to sinners.

=== Catholic heyday ===
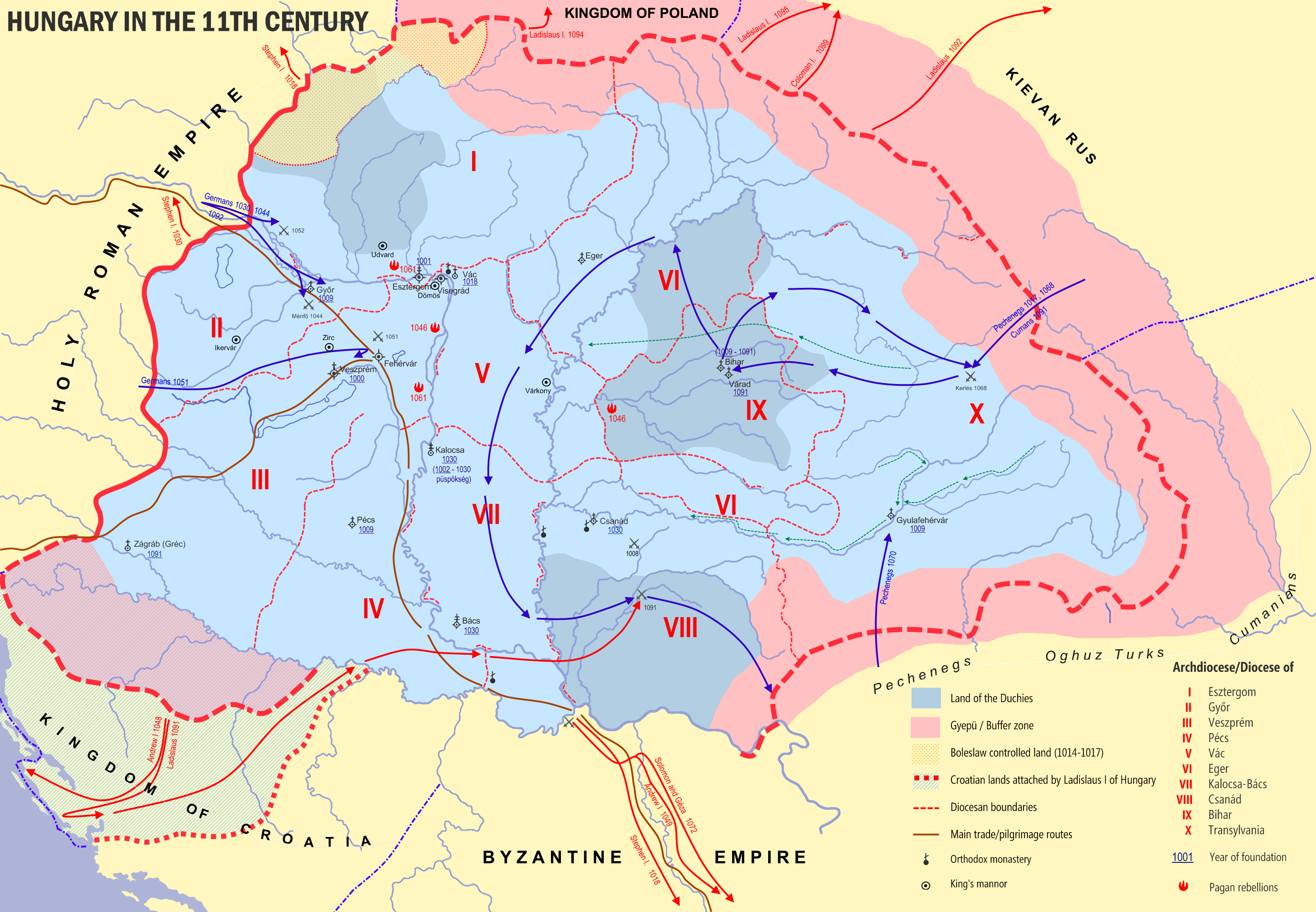
Dioceses in the Kingdom of Hungary in the 1090s

Burials outside churchyards disappeared early in the 12th century. Large three-aisled basilicas with two towers were built at the episcopal sees. Churches built at lay landowners' estates played an important role in the development of parishes. They were either single-naved churches or rotundas. The aristocrats regarded these churches as part of their patrimony and freely appointed their priests.

Most churches were dedicated to the Virgin Mary, George of Lydda, the Archangel Michael, Martin of Tours, Nicholas of Myra, and Peter the Apostle, but the first Hungarian saints' cult quickly spread after their canonization. The first Cistercian and the Premonstratensian monasteries were established in the 1140s. The monarchs preferred the Cistercians, (Note: For instance, the Cistercian abbeys of Zirc (1182), Szentgotthárd (1183) and Pilis (1184) were royal foundations.) but the aristocrats founded Premonstratensian (Note: For example, Premonstratensian priory was established at Zsámbék by the Ajnárdfi, at Türje by the Türje kindred.) houses. King Géza II settled the Knights Hospitaller and Templar in the country and established a Hungarian order of hospitaller canons in honor of King St Stephen.

Hungarian clerics studied in the universities of Paris and Oxford from the 1150s. They were mostly canons who financed their studies from the income of their prebends in collegiate chapters. The use of written records spread. The collegiate chapters and major monasteries played an important role in the process as "places of authentication", providing notary services from around 1200. The first extant religious text in Hungarian—a burial speech—was written around 1200.

Géza II concluded a concordat with Pope Alexander III. Géza's right to dismiss bishops or transfer them from a see to another was abolished, but he was authorized to deliver the pallium to the archbishops and to control correspondence between the Hungarian prelates and the Holy See. Géza's son and successor, Stephen III, renounced the right to appoint the abbots of the royal monasteries and to administer the goods of vacant bishoprics. When Stephen died in 1172, his younger brother, Béla, succeeded him. Lucas, Archbishop of Esztergom, denied to crown him, but the Pope authorized the archbishop of Kalocsa to perform the ceremony. Lucas referred to Béla's alleged simony to explain his resistance, but he most probably feared of the influence of the Orthodox Church Béla who had grewn up in the Byzantine Empire. Schism between the Catholic and Orthodox Churches had deepened. Béla III could not introduce the cult of the Bulgarian hermit John of Rila in Hungary. Job, Archbishop of Esztergom, entered into an unfriendly correspondence with the Byzantine Emperor Isaac II Angelos about the differences between Catholic and Orthodox theologies. Béla's elder son and successor, Emeric, proposed Pope Innocent III to appoint a Catholic bishop to administer the Greek monasteries in Hungary in 1204. He did not achieve his goal, but the Greek monasteries disappeared during the following decades.

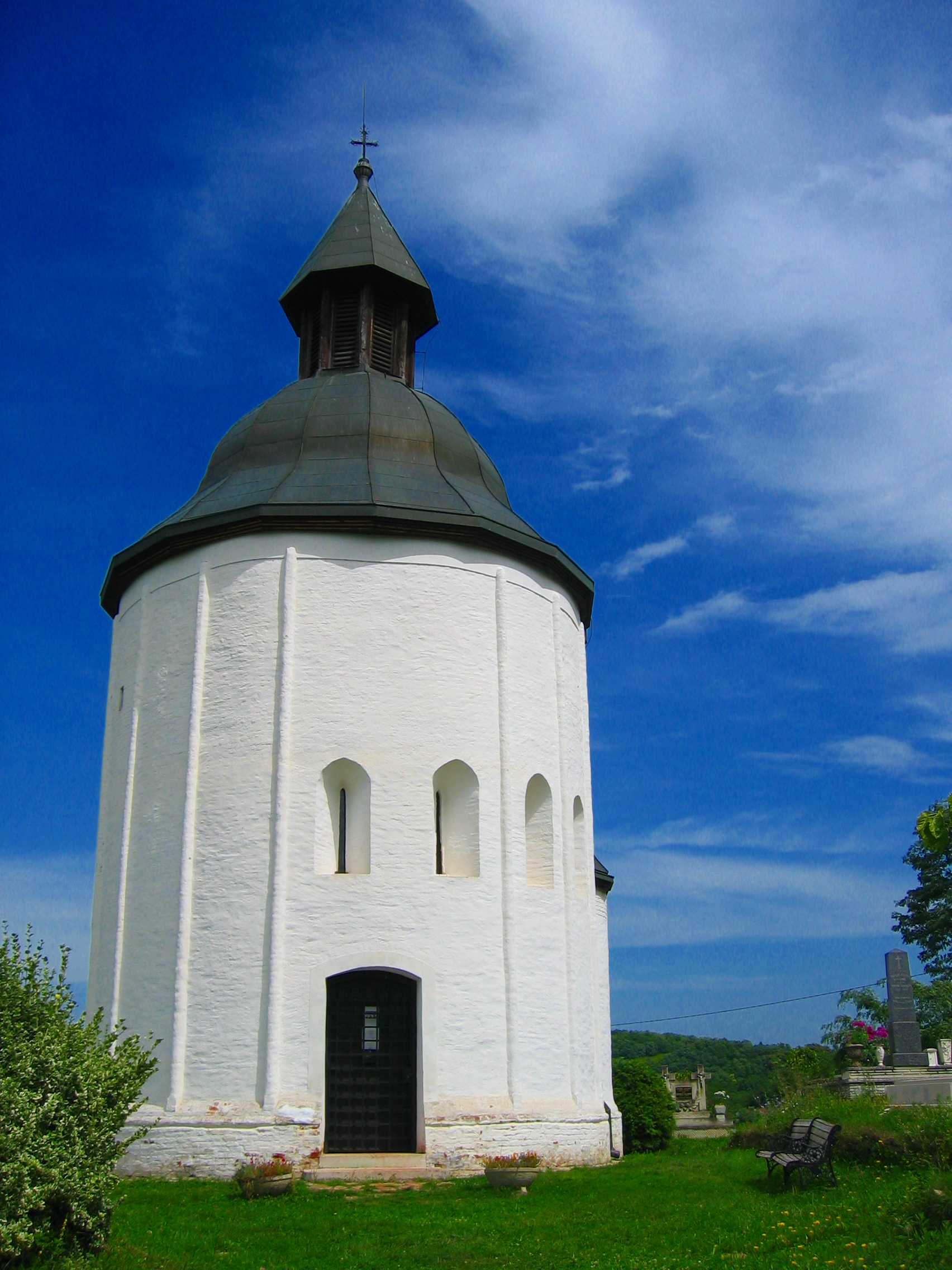
Romanesque rotunda at Kallósd

Béla III and his successors adopted an active foreign policy, often in close alliance with the Papacy. Emeric waged a war against Ban Kulin of Bosnia whom Pope Innocent III regarded as the Bogumils' main protector. Emeric's brother, Andrew II, launched a crusade to the Holy Land in 1217–1218. Andrew's son, Béla IV, supported the Dominicans' missions among the Cumans of the Pontic steppes. The mendicant orders settled in Hungary in the 1220s. In contrast with the traditional monastic orders, the mendicants willingly mingled with the common people to spread Christian ideas. One of the eight initial provinces of the Dominicans was set up in Hungary. Friar Paulus Hungarus, who had taught Roman law at the university of Bologna, returned to his homeland to found the first Dominican priories in 1221. The Franciscans came to Hungary in 1229.

Andrew II made generous grants to the aristocrats, threatening the social position of the royal servants and castle warriors (small landholders who had been directly subject to the monarch or his officials). The latter forced the monarch to summarize their liberties in a royal charter, known as the Golden Bull of 1222. The Golden Bull also confirmed the clerics' exemption of royal taxes, but limited the prelates' right to trade in salt and prohibited the collection of the tithe in cash. The clerics' liberties were summarized in a separate document, most probably around the end of 1222. The King confirmed that only ecclesiastical courts could sit in judgement on clerics, but it also prohibited the ordination of serfs as priests.

Andrew II employed Jews and Muslims in the administration of royal revenues, outraging the prelates and Pope Honorius III. The Pope authorized Robert, Archbishop of Esztergom to apply ecclesiastical sanctions against the King in 1231. Andrew II was forced to re-issue the Golden Bull, but without the articles that prejudged the interests of the Church. The new document exempted the prelates' estates of the jurisdiction of the ispáns and established the monopoly of ecclesiastical courts in matters relating to marriage and dowry. It also authorized the archbishop of Esztergom to excommunicate the monarch if he did not respect its articles. Arcbhbishop Robert placed Hungary under interdict for the employment of Muslims in state administration and the Pope sent a legate to negotiate with Andrew II. Their compromise was summarized in a treaty which obliged the King to dismiss his Muslim and Jewish officials and to enable the prelates to trade in salt.

The Dominican Friar Julian learnt of the Mongols' plan to invade Europe during his mission among the Eastern Magyars (a pagan people on the Volga) in 1236. The Mongols forced thousands of pagan Cumans to seek refuge in Hungary in 1240. The Mongols stormed into Hungary and defeated the royal army in the Battle of Mohi on 11 April 1241. The Mongols devastated the country for a year, but they withdrew without leaving garrisons behind. Hungary survived the Mongol occupation and Béla IV introduced measures to strengthen the defence system. He urged the wealthiest landowners, both the laymen and the prelates, to build stone castles.

The position of the archbishops of Esztergom strengthened. Béla IV authorized the archbishop to supervise royal coinage. He also enabled the noblemen to will their estates to the archbishopric and to enter into the archbishop's service. Béla's successor, Stephen V prevented the archbishop's noble warriors from demanding the privileges of the "true nobles of the realm". Stephen granted Esztergom County to the archbishops, making them its perpetual ispán.

Asceticism and the development of eremitical communities was an eminent feature of the spiritual life in the 13th century. A canon of Esztergom, Eusebius, settled in the woods of the Pilis Hills to live as a hermit in 1246. Ascetics joined him and their community developed into the new order of hermits, known as Paulines during the following decades. The Dominicans lost favour with Béla IV after his daughter, Margaret, who was a Dominican nun, refused to marry, ruining his plan of a marriage alliance. Béla thereafter supported the Franciscans who established more than forty priories during the following decades.

== See also ==
- History of the Catholic Church in Hungary
- Protestantism in Hungary
- Cardinal Péter Erdő, was seen as a leading candidate in the 2025 papal conclave
- Tamás Bakócz (serious candidate in the 1513 papal conclave from Hungary)

== Sources ==
- Berend, Nora; Laszlovszky, József; Szakács, Béla Zsolt (2007). "The kingdom of Hungary". In Berend, Nora (ed.). Christianization and the Rise of Christian Monarchy: Scandinavia, Central Europe and Rus', c.900-1200. Cambridge University Press. pp. 319–368. ISBN 978-0-521-87616-2.
- Bóna, István (1976). The Dawn of the Dark Ages: The Gepids and the Lombards in the Carpathian Basin. Corvina Kiadó. ISBN 978-963-13-4493-6.
- Curta, Florin (2019). Eastern Europe in the Middle Ages (500-1300), Volume I. Brill's Companion to European History. Vol. 19. BRILL. ISBN 978-90-04-41534-8.
- Gáspár, Dorottya (2016) [2002]. Christianity in Roman Pannonia: An Evaluation of Early Christian Finds and Sites from Hungary. BAR International Series. Vol. 1010. BAR Publishing. ISBN 978-1-84171-288-8.
- Heather, Peter (2010) [2009]. Empires and Barbarians: The Fall of Rome and the Birth of Europe. Oxford University Press. ISBN 978-0-19-973560-0.
- Kontler, László (1999). Millennium in Central Europe: A History of Hungary. Atlantisz Publishing House. ISBN 978-963-9165-37-3.
- Kristó, Gyula (1998). Magyarország története, 895-1301 [The History of Hungary, 895-1301] (in Hungarian). Osiris. ISBN 963-379-442-0.
- Mócsy, András (1974). Pannonia and Upper Moesia: A History of the Middle Danube Provinces. The Provinces of the Roman Empire. Routledge and Kegan Paul. ISBN 0-7100-7714-9.
- Olajos, Teréz (2001). "Az avar továbbélés kérdéséről: a 9. századi avar történelem görög és latin nyelvű forrásai [On the Avars' survival: Greek and Latin sources of the 9th-century Avar history]". Tiszatáj (in Hungarian). LV (11): 49–56. ISSN 0133-1167.
- Pohl, Walter (2018). The Avars: A Steppe Empire in Central Europe, 567-822. Cornell University Press. ISBN 9780801442100.
- Szőke, Béla Miklós (2014). The Carolingian Age in the Carpathian Basin. Hungarian National Museum. ISBN 978-615-5209-17-8.
- Thoroczkay, Gábor (2001). "The Dioceses and Bishops of Saint Stephen". In Zsoldos, Attila (ed.). Saint Stephen and His Country: A Newborn Kingdom in Central Europe – Hungary. Lucidus Kiadó. pp. 49–68. ISBN 978-963-86163-9-5.
- Zimonyi, István (2016). Muslim Sources on the Magyars in the Second Half of the 9th Century. East Central and Eastern Europe in the Middle Ages, 450–1450. Vol. 35. Brill. ISBN 978-90-04-21437-8.
- Zsoldos, Attila (2020). The Árpáds and Their People: An Introduction to the History of Hungary from cca. 900 to 1301. Arpadiana. Vol. IV. Research Center for the Humanities. ISBN 978-963-416-226-1.
