= Pál Sárközy =

Hungarian Benedictine monk

- Archabbot of Pannonhalma Archabbey
- Church: Roman Catholic Church
- See: Pannonhalma Archabbey
- In office: 1951–1957
- Predecessor: Krizosztom Kelemen
- Successor: Norbert Legányi
- Previous post: Abbot of Bakonybél

Orders
- Ordination: 1909

Personal details
- Born: 3 December 1884 Jánosháza, Austria-Hungary
- Died: 10 May 1957 (aged 72) Pannonhalma, Hungary
- Denomination: Roman Catholic

Pál Sárközy (born Endre Sárközy; 3 December 1884 – 10 May 1957) was a Hungarian Benedictine monk, who served as Archabbot of the Pannonhalma Archabbey from 29 March 1951 until his death.

== Early life ==
Endre Sárközy was born in Jánosháza, Vas County on 3 December 1884. He finished his secondary studies in the Premonstratensian Gymnasium at Keszthely. He entered the Benedictine Order on 6 August 1902. He was given the name Pál (Paul) when took the habit. He was ordained as a priest in 1909. He taught in Győr from 1909 to 1910. He became a lecturer of the Saint Gerard College of Pannonhalma in 1910, where he taught mathematics and philosophy. He earned a degree in liberal arts at the University of Budapest (today Eötvös Loránd University) in 1914.

During the interwar period, Sárközy pursued scientific activity. He principally dealt with differential geometry and differential equation, in addition to the Hungarian history of mathematics during his academic career. He was also a noted textbook author during the era. He joined the staff of the Pázmány Péter Catholic University in 1929. He was elected prior of Pannonhalma in the same year. He served as the last abbot of Bakonybél between 1938 and 1951.

== Administrator, then archabbot ==
Following the World War II and the Soviet occupation of Hungary, the Benedictine Order has come under pressure by the new Communist-dominated and pro-Soviet governments. Archabbot Krizosztom Kelemen emigrated to Brazil in March 1947. Officially, he left Hungary for a few months to visit the Hungarian Benedictine monastic orders in the Latin American country. Simultaneously, Pál Sárközy, then prior of Pannonhalma and abbot of Bakonybél, was nominated apostolic administrator and deputy (Latin: substitutus) abbot of the Pannonhalma Archabbey. While residing in Brazil, Kelemen participated in the election of Bernard Kälin, Abbot Primate of the Benedictine Confederation, where he tendered his resignation to the Holy See in September 1947. Despite that Kelemen remained nominal archabbot until his death, while Sárközy served as his deputy.

In February 1948, Sárközy was elected representative of all Hungarian monastic orders during the celebrations of the Year of Mary or Beata Virgo. In the following period, the religious orders were suppressed by the Communist authorities. Eight secondary schools and nineteen elementary schools of the Benedictine Order were secularized and nationalized by the government in June 1948. The State Protection Authority (ÁVH) interned and deported the Benedictine monks to Kalocsa, Szolnok and Tihany in June 1950, alongside the other monastic orders. As a result, the ancients abbeys of Bakonybél, Tihany, Celldömölk and Zalavár were abolished. Nevertheless, Sárközy bore the title of abbot of Bakonybél until his election as archabbot. Representing the monastic orders, Sárközy participated in the negotiations between the government and the Hungarian Catholic Bishops' Conference. The church was forced to accept the ultimatum on 31 August 1950. Accordingly, the Catholic Church recovered altogether eight secondary schools and the Hungarian state permitted the operation of three male and one female religious orders with limited number of monks and nuns, respectively. The Benedictine Order was among those authorized societies with maximum 72 monks. In addition to Pannonhalma, the order was able to retain only the gymnasium at Győr. According to the agreement, Sárközy had to dismiss the three quarters of the members of the order at the turn of 1950 and 1951.

Krizosztom Kelemen died in Pittsburgh, Pennsylvania on 7 November 1950. Pál Sárközy convened an assembly of the convent and announced his death on 12 November. Two days later, Sárközy wrote a letter to Cardinal Clemente Micara, then Prefect of the Sacred Congregation of Religious, in order to inform him on Kelemen's death and request action to fill the position. Due to the extraordinary situation of church politics, Sárközy was appointed as Archabbot of Pannonhalma by Pope Pius XII on 28 March 1951, instead of the canonical election prescribed in the statutes. Sárközy started his service on the next day, 29 March 1951. The newly formed State Office for Church Affairs (ÁEH) recognized him and did not hinder his activity thereafter. Sárközy sworn in on the Hungarian Constitution of 1949 on 21 July 1951 and the Presidential Council contributed to his appointment on 4 August 1951.

Pál Sárközy died on 10 May 1957 after a long illness. He was buried on 13 May 1957.

== Sources ==
- Rétfalvi, Balázs (2012). "Sárközy Pál főapáti kinevezése [The Appointment of Archabbot Pál Sárközy]". In Illés, Pál Attila; Juhász-Laczik, Albin (eds.). Örökség és küldetés. Bencések Magyarországon (Rendtörténeti konferenciák 7/1) (in Hungarian). Magyar Egyháztörténeti Enciklopédia Munkaközösség (METEM). pp. 561–572. ISBN 978-963-9662-60-5.
- Várszegi, Asztrik (2007). "Ötven éve hunyt el Sárközy Pál főapát úr [The 50th Anniversary of the Death of Archabbot Pál Sárközy]". Bencés Hírlevél (in Hungarian). 9 (2). Hungarian Benedictine Congregation: 3–4.

Catholic Church titles
Preceded by Irén Zoltvány	Abbot of Bakonybél; 1938–1951	Succeeded by Position abolished
Preceded by Krizosztom Kelemen	Archabbot of Pannonhalma; 1951–1957	Succeeded by Norbert Legányi
