= Culusi =

Roman town in Africa Proconsolare

Africa Proconsularis (125 AD)

Culusi was a Roman town of the Roman province of Africa Proconsolare, located near Carthage. It is also known as Culcitana or Culsitana. The city is tentatively identified with ruins in the suburbs of Tunisia.

Culusi was also the seat of an ancient Christian bishopric, through the Roman Empire and into late antiquity, a suffragan of the Archdiocese of Carthage. Today Culusi survives as a titular bishopric and the current bishop is Asztrik Várszegi, of Pannonhalma.

== Known bishops ==
- Nicasio (mentioned in 349) took part in the Synod of Carthage of 349.
- Vincenzo (before 407 - after 419) Vincenzo, delegate to the emperor in 407, attended the Conference of Carthage (411) and was present at another African council of 419.
- Emiliano (mentioned in 484) was among the Catholic bishops summoned to Carthage in 484 by the Vandal king Huneric in 484 attended the bishop Emiliano, who was exiled to Corsica
- Marciano (mentioned in 525) took part in a synodal assembly of 525.
- Peter (mentioned in 646) signed the acts of the African council of 646 antimonotelita.

Today Culusi survives as a titular bishopric of the Roman Catholic Church and the current bishop is Asztrik Várszegi, of Pannonhalma.

- Joachim N'Dayen (5 September 1968 – 16 September 1970)
- Louis Vangeke, (21 September 1970 – 1 March 1976)
- Imre Asztrik Várszegi, from 23 December 1988
