= Norbert Legányi =

Hungarian Benedictine monk

- Archabbot of Pannonhalma Archabbey
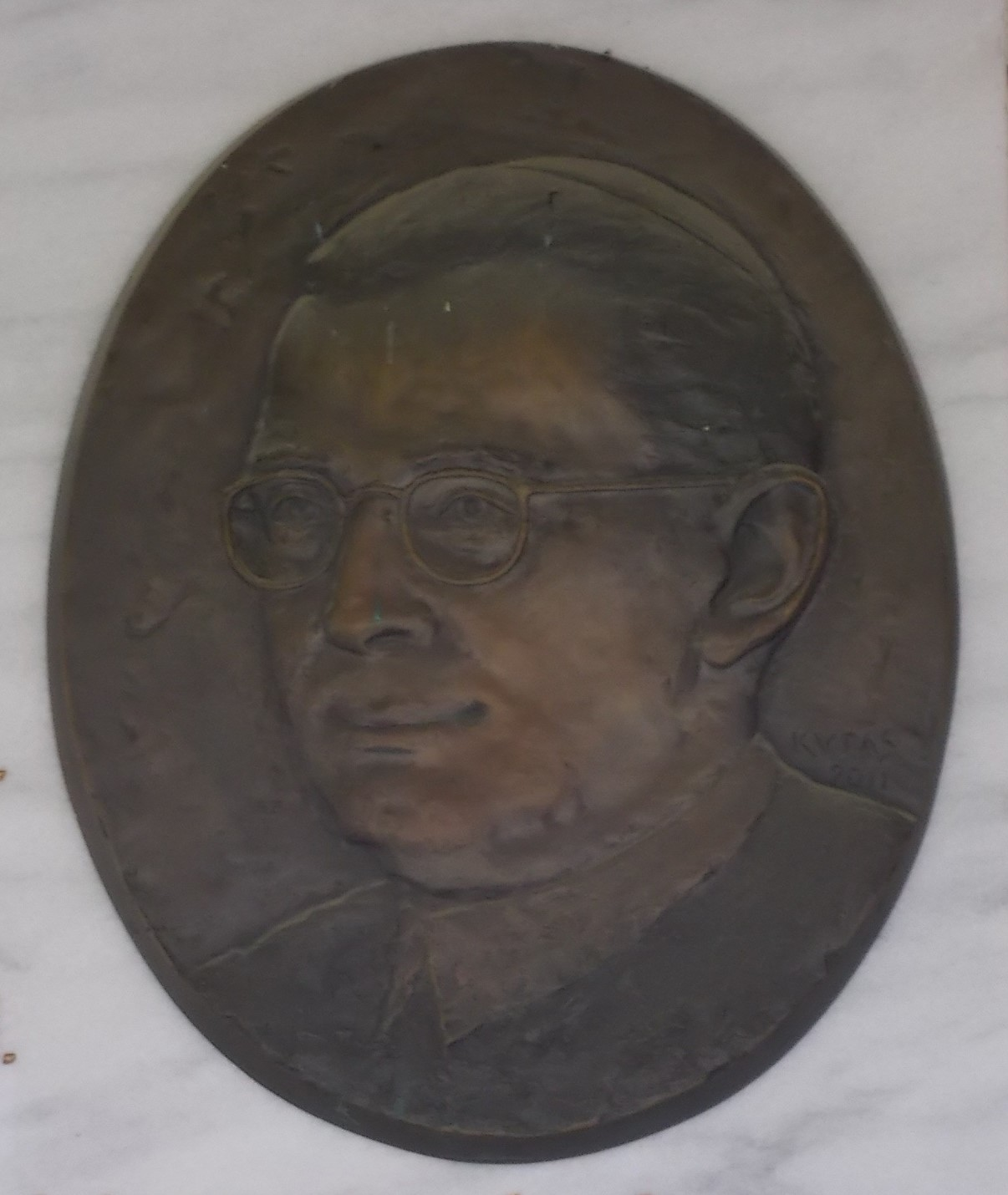
- Relief in Békéscsaba (2020)
- Church: Roman Catholic Church
- See: Pannonhalma Archabbey
- In office: 1958–1969
- Predecessor: Pál Sárközy
- Successor: András Szennay
- Previous post: Prior of Pannonhalma

Orders
- Ordination: 1930

Personal details
- Born: 24 May 1906 Pestszentlőrinc (today part of Budapest), Austria-Hungary
- Died: 13 May 1987 (aged 80) Pannonhalma, Hungary
- Denomination: Roman Catholic

Norbert Legányi (born Béla Legányi; 24 May 1906 – 13 May 1987) was a Hungarian Benedictine monk, who served as Archabbot of the Pannonhalma Archabbey from 21 March 1958 to January 1969.

== Biography ==
=== Early life ===
Béla Legányi was born in Pestszentlőrinc (today a borough of the 18th district of Budapest) on 24 May 1906. He graduated from the Hungarian Royal State Széchenyi István Gymnasium at Tisztviselőtelep ("Functionary estate", today part of Józsefváros). He entered the Order of Saint Benedict upon the guidance of his divinity teacher Béla Witz in 1924. He was given the name Norbert when took the habit. He attended the Saint Gerard College of Pannonhalma from 1925 to 1929. He obtained his qualification as a teacher of mathematics and physics in 1930. He was ordained as a priest in the same year. During the interwar period, he taught in several secondary schools of the Benedictine Order, for instance in Győr, Esztergom, Pápa and Pannonhalma. He was involved in the Scout Movement.

=== Ecclesiastical career ===
He became headmaster of the local Benedictine gymnasium at Kőszeg in 1947. When the religious schools were secularized and nationalized by the Communist authorities, Legányi was interned to Szolnok in July 1950. Thereafter, Pál Sárközy, the incumbent archabbot entrusted him to reclaim the Pannonhalma Gymnasium. He served as its headmaster from 1950 to 1952. He was also appointed prior of the Pannonhalma Archabbey in 1952, i.e. the archabbot's first deputy. Following the Hungarian Revolution of 1956 and its suppression, he again functioned as acting headmaster because of the imprisonment of Dávid Söveges. After the death of Sárközy in May 1957, Legányi was elected archabbot on 11 November 1957, he started his service on 21 March 1958. The Communist-backed State Office for Church Affairs (ÁEH) acknowledged and accepted his election, as Legányi was silently expected to cooperate with the state authority in the politically required social integration of his order in Hungary. The Holy See also confirmed his election.

According to his biographer and later successor Asztrik Várszegi, the 52-year-old Legányi began his work with great idealism and energy. He was also a member of the Hungarian Catholic Bishops' Conference (MKPK). He attended the third session of the Second Vatican Council in the autumn of 1964. He convened the general chapter of Pannonhalma in order to renew its Benedictine statutes and announced to themes in 1967. However his personal firmness, consistency and his requirements during the negotiations with the members of the Benedictine Order and state authorities made him unpopular. He did not join the so-called Opus Pacis, the "peace movement" of the pro-Communist clergymen. He allowed the students of the gymnasium at Pannonhalma to commemorate the fifth anniversary of the Hungarian Uprising on 23 October 1961. The Communist authorities aimed to isolate him and to hinder his activity by employing people outside and inside the community (Legányi's local opposition in Pannonhalma within the Benedictines). The State Office for Church Affairs gradually ignored and forgot to cooperate with him. Upon due consideration, Legányi decided to resign and retire if his leadership and personality hindered the development of the Pannonhalma Archabbey. He submitted his resignation in 1967, which was accepted by Pope Paul VI in December 1968.

=== Later life ===
After his resignation, Norbert Legányi had to leave Pannonhalma. Sándor Kovács, the Bishop of Szombathely was afraid of giving shelter to him. Imre Kisberk, the Bishop of Székesfehérvár received him into the Social Home for Priests where he spent 7 years. In 1976, at the request of his successor András Szennay, state secretary Imre Miklós, the Chairman of the State Office for Church Affairs gave the permission for the 70-year-old Legányi to return to Pannonhalma. He lived in the monastery until his death in 1987.

== Sources ==
- Várszegi, Asztrik (2012). "Legányi Norbert pannonhalmi főapát (1906–1987) [Norbert Legányi Archabbot of Pannonhalma (1906–1987)]". In Illés, Pál Attila; Juhász-Laczik, Albin (eds.). Örökség és küldetés. Bencések Magyarországon (Rendtörténeti konferenciák 7/1) (in Hungarian). Magyar Egyháztörténeti Enciklopédia Munkaközösség (METEM). pp. 553–560. ISBN 978-963-9662-60-5.

Catholic Church titles
Preceded by Pál Sárközy	Archabbot of Pannonhalma; 1958–1969	Succeeded by András Szennay
