= András Szennay =

20th-century Hungarian abbot

- Archabbot of Pannonhalma Archabbey
- Church: Roman Catholic Church
- See: Pannonhalma Archabbey
- In office: 1973-91
- Predecessor: Norbert Legányi
- Successor: Asztrik Várszegi
- Previous post: Prelate

Orders
- Ordination: 19 November 1944

Personal details
- Born: 2 June 1921 Budapest, Hungary
- Died: 22 August 2012 (aged 91) Pannonhalma, Hungary

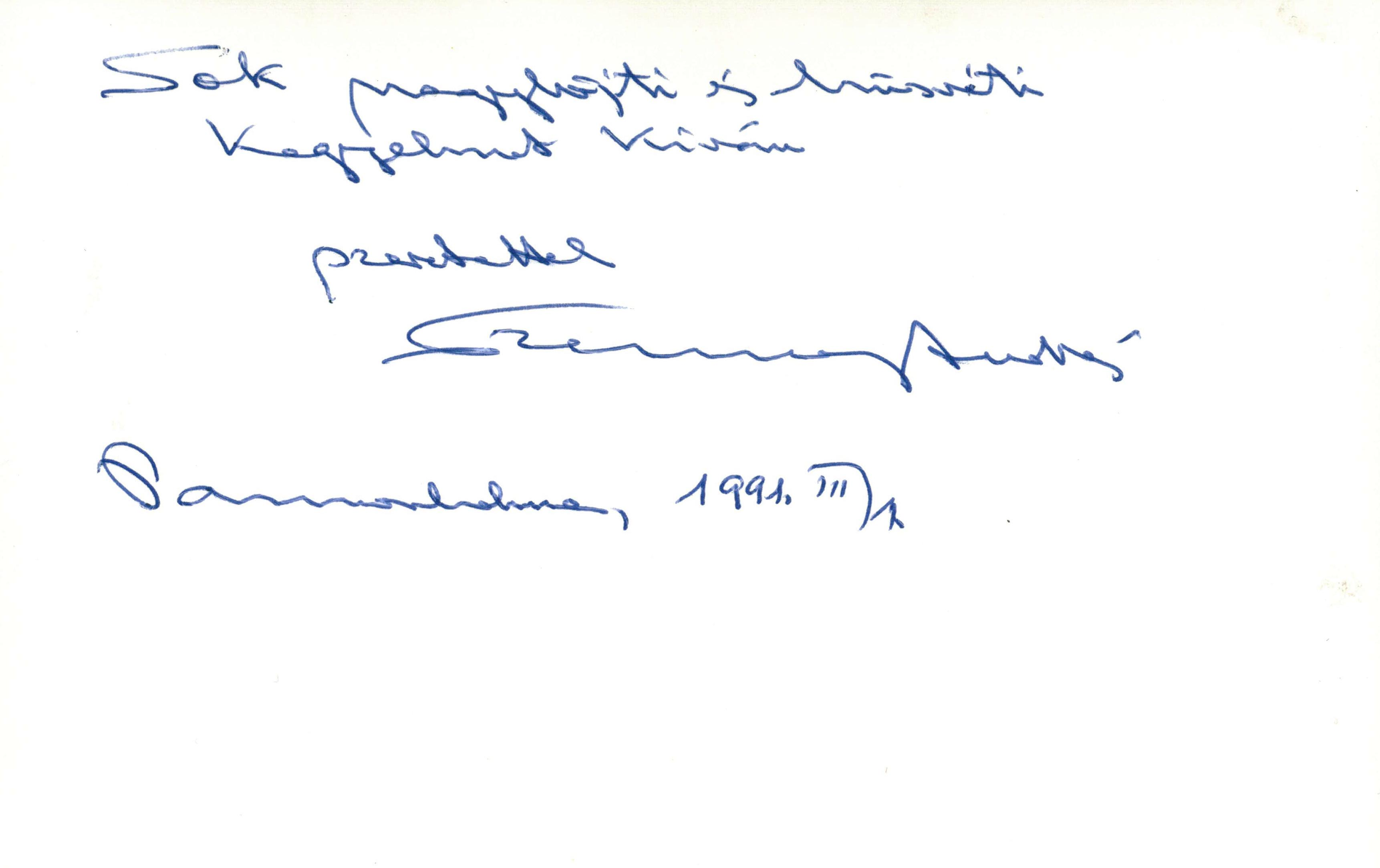
András Szennay Abbott of Pannonhalma sends His kind regards on 01/03/1991

András Szennay (born József Szennay; 2 June 1921 – 22 August 2012) was a Hungarian prelate of the Roman Catholic Church. He was born in Budapest and ordained a priest on 19 November 1944. Szennay was appointed Abbot nullius and Archabbot of the Pannonhalma Archabbey on 14 March 1973 and remained in this position until resigning in 1991. He died in 2012, aged 91.
