= Maurus of Pécs =

Hungarian prelate and saint

Saint Maurus
- Bishop of Pécs
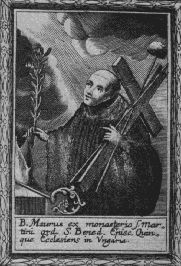
- Province: Esztergom
- Diocese: Pécs
- Appointed: 1036
- Term ended: c. 1075
- Predecessor: Bonipert
- Other post: Abbot of Pannonhalma

Personal details
- Born: c. 1000
- Died: c. 1075
- Denomination: Roman Catholic

Sainthood
- Feast day: the fourth Sunday of October (till 1913); October 25 (from 1913)
- Canonized: July 22, 1848 (cult confirmed) by Pope Pius IX
- Patronage: Diocese of Pécs

Maurus of Pécs or Mór (Hungarian: Mór pécsi püspök) was the first known prelate who was born in the Kingdom of Hungary. He was abbot of the Benedictine Abbey of Pannonhalma between around 1029 and 1036, and bishop of Pécs from year 1036 until his death around year 1075. He wrote the Legend of Benedict of Szkalka and Andrew Zorard, two hermits who lived in the region of Nitra in modern-day Slovakia. Maurus's own cult was confirmed by Pope Pius IX in 1848.

== Life ==
Maurus was born around 1000. János Karácsonyi and other historians have suggested that he was born in the region of Nyitra, but he himself does not refer to it as his place of birth in his work on the two hermits from the same region. The Legend of Saint Emmeric relates that Maurus was still a child when his parents sent him to the Benedictine abbey at Pannonhalma. The Legend also reveals that Maurus was on friendly terms with Emeric, the crown prince of Hungary. For instance, Maurus was the only monk whom Emeric greeted with seven kisses on the occasion of one of his visits in the monastery, demonstrating his conviction that Maurus had respected his vow of chastity.

Emeric's father, Stephen I, the first king of Hungary appointed Maurus abbot of the monastery in 1029 at the latest. According to the Greater Legend of Saint Gerard, Maurus sent four monks from Pannonhalma to assist Gerard, the first bishop of Csanád (now Cenad, Romania) in organizing the new diocese. The Annales Posonienses narrates that Maurus was appointed the second bishop of Pécs in 1036.

Maurus was the prelate who finished the construction of the earliest cathedral in Pécs in the reign of Stephen I's successor, Peter I. He was one of the three bishops who survived the pagan uprising that put an end to King Peter's rule, thus the three bishops together celebrated the coronation of the new king, Andrew I in Székesfehérvár in 1046. Maurus's prestige in the new king's court is demonstrated by the deed of founding of the Benedictine Tihany Abbey from 1055 on which his signature is only preceded by that of the archbishop of Esztergom. The contemporary Palatine of the kingdom, Radó also bequeathed a part of his possessions to Maurus and the bishopric of Pécs in his last will in 1056. The Palatine's will was confirmed by both King Andrew I and his brother and successor, Béla I.

Following Béla I's death, Maurus succeeded in mediating a peace between the late king's sons, Géza and Ladislav and King Andrew I's son, Solomon who celebrated their agreement in Pécs on Easter in 1064. Here Géza and Ladislav accepted Salamon's right to the throne. Although the cathedral and the bishop's palace were burnt on the next day, around that time Prince Géza asked the elderly Maurus to write a biography of Benedict and Andrew-Zorard, two hermits from the region of Nitra. In addition to a narration of abbot Philip of Zobor, Maurus could base his work on his conversations with Benedict in his youth in the abbey of Pannonhalma.

His cult began shortly after his death. Based on the continuous tradition of Maurus's local veneration, his cult was confirmed by the Holy See on July 22, 1848. Pope Pius IX emphasized that "there are mass-books from 1499 which sing Blessed Maurus's praises, and his name was also recorded in Martyrologies". He was initially celebrated in the Diocese of Pécs on the fourth Sunday of each October, but October 25 became his feast day in 1913.

== Sources ==
- Berend, Nora; Laszlovszky, József; Szakács, Béla Zsolt (2007). "The kingdom of Hungary". In Berend, Nora (ed.). Christianization and the Rise of Christian Monarchy: Scandinavia, Central Europe and Rus', c.900-1200. Cambridge University Press. pp. 319–368. ISBN 978-0-521-87616-2.
- Koszta, László (2009). "Szt. Mór (1036-1070/1075 körül) [=St. Maurus (1036-1070/c. 1075)]". In Fedeles, Tamás; Sarbak, Gábor; Sümegi, József (eds.). A Pécsi Egyházmegye története I: A középkor évszázadai (1009-1543) [=A History of the Diocese of Pécs, Volume I: Medieval Centuries (1009-1543)] (in Hungarian). Fény Kft. pp. 59–62. ISBN 978-963-88572-0-0.
- Sümegi, József (2008). "Mór, Pécs szent életű püspöke [=Maurus, the holy bishop of Pécs]". In Sümegi, József (ed.). A Pécsi Egyházmegye ezer éve [=Millennium of the Diocese of Pécs] (in Hungarian). Fény Kft. pp. 26–31. ISBN 978-963-85841-5-1.

Maurus of Pécs Born: c. 1000 Died: c. 1075
Catholic Church titles
Preceded by Bonipert	Bishop of Pécs; 1036–c. 1075	Succeeded by (?) Stephen I
Preceded by	Abbot of Pannonhalma b. 1029–1036	Succeeded by
