= Eduard Benedek Brunschweiler =

Swiss Righteous Among the Nations

Eduard Benedek Brunschweiler (1910–1987) was a Swiss national who was appointed by the International Committee of the Red Cross to manage the Benedictine Archabbey of Pannonhalma on their behalf, during the final months of the German occupation, towards the end of the Second World War.

In early 1944, Archabbot Kelemen Krizosztom wrote to the Committee with a proposal that the Archabbey, situated in North-Western Hungary, be placed at the disposal of the ICRC. Friedrich Born, the ICRC delegate in Budapest, took this opportunity both to help protect the 800-year-old historical buildings and at the same time make use of them to provide shelter for refugees from the conflict. Born obtained agreements from the Hungarian government and the German military that the premises of the abbey were to be regarded as militarily neutral, despite the fact that they were directly on the line of defence between the Soviet Red Army and the German forces.

In October 1944, Born appointed Brunschweiler, a Swiss national who had been living in Budapest, to take charge of the operation, on behalf of the ICRC. Brunschweiler managed to arrange a meeting with the German Reich plenipotentiary for Hungary, Edmund Veesenmayer, concerning arrangements for the shelter of the refugees there. According to Arieh Ben-Tov's research, Veesemeyer accepted that Jewish children would be sheltered in the archabbey but insisted that the percentage of Jewish refugees should not exceed those of half-Jewish refugees (Arieh Ben-Tov, p333).

At the time, those Hungarian Jews who had not been sent on train transports to extermination camps were being force-marched West ahead of the Soviet advances and many died on these journeys. Born's instructions to Brunschweiler were that children who had lost their parents or otherwise needed protection could be given shelter but 'political figures', men and boys over the age of 14 were not to be accepted. In fact, the monks in Pannonhalma turned a blind eye to many of these restrictions.

As the Red Army approached Pannonhalma, the refugee population grew to about 3000 people. Following the defeat of the defensive forces around the abbey in April 1945, the Red Army took control of the area and Brunschweiler and the ICRC were expelled from the Abbey.

In 2001, a Hungarian director, Szilveszter Siklósi, made a documentary about this episode entitled "My castle, my shelter" ("Menedéket adó váram" in Hungarian). On 17 October 2006 a memorial plaque to Brunschweiler was unveiled at the Archabbey . On 31 March 2009 the Israeli ambassador to Hungary presented an award to the present arch-abbot of the Abbey, posthumously recognizing Brunschweiler as Righteous among the Nations for his actions in sheltering the refugees.
