= Sigfrid of Pannonhalma =

Hungarian 14th-century abbot

Sigfrid
- Abbot of Pannonhalma
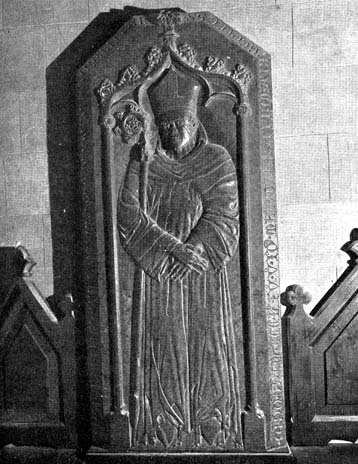
- Tombstone of Abbot Sigfrid
- Installed: 13 April 1355
- Term ended: 11 March 1365
- Predecessor: William Hammer
- Successor: Ladislaus Cudar
- Previous posts: Abbot of Széplak; Abbot of Garamszentbenedek

Personal details
- Born: 1300s
- Died: 11 March 1365
- Denomination: Catholic

Sigfrid (Hungarian: Szigfrid; 1300s – 11 March 1365) was a Hungarian Benedictine friar and prelate in the 14th century, who served as Abbot of Garamszentbenedek from 1330 to 1355, then Abbot of Pannonhalma from 1355 until his death. He was a leading figure of the 14th-century Benedictine reformist movement in Hungary.

== Early life ==
Sigfrid began his ecclesiastical career as a member of the royal chapel in the court of King Charles I of Hungary. Later, Charles' son and successor Louis I of Hungary also referred to Sigfrid as his chaplain. By 1327, Sigfrid became abbot of the Benedictine Abbey of Széplak (Krásna, present-day a borough of Košice, Slovakia). In this capacity, he was among those five abbots in Upper Hungary, who requested the cathedral chapter of Nyitra (Nitra) in October 1327 to transcribe the 1225 papal bull of Pope Honorius III, which calls to hold annual Benedictine chapters.

== Abbot of Garamszentbenedek ==
Sigfrid was elected as abbot of the Garamszentbenedek Abbey (present-day Hronský Beňadik, Slovakia) sometime between 13 August 1329 and 13 July 1330, most likely in the latter year. John, his successor as abbot of Széplak was already mentioned by the last will and testament of William Drugeth on 9 August 1330.

While serving in Garamszentbenedek, Sigfrid proved to be a leading figure of the 14th-century Benedictine reformist movement in Hungary. Pope John XXII supported the abbot in his efforts. In his two letters (June 1332), the pope ordered to summon cathedral and collegiate chapters annually and entrusted Sigfrid and Nicholas III of Pannonhalma to organize and conduct the first such meeting in the next year. Simultaneously, Pope John XXII also instructed Mieszko of Bytom, the Bishop of Nyitra to restore the privileges and revenues of the Garamszentbenedek Abbey upon the request of Sigfrid. According to historian Kristóf Keglevich, Sigfrid resided in the Roman Curia at Avignon at the time, when these papal bulls were sent to Hungary, thus, he was actively involved in the elaboration of the reform points. Pope Benedict XII continued to support the reformist Benedictine movement. His bull ("Summi magistri") also prescribed the holding of annual chapters within the order and instructed four abbots in Hungary – including Sigfrid – to supervise it in 1336. On the other hand, Sigfrid had endeavored to recover of former Benedictine monasteries for the order, which had previously fallen into foreign hands (secular or other ecclesiastical order). In the name of the pope, Sigfrid sent a letter to Nicholas Dörögdi, the Bishop of Eger in 1337 to reclaim former Benedictine monasteries – Kolozsmonostor, Bulcs (Bulci), Bizere, Garáb, Mogyoród – unlawfully usurped by others in the territory of his diocese for the Benedictine friars, in addition to the Priory of Béla (Bijela) in the Diocese of Zagreb. Upon the request of Sigfrid and Daniel, the abbot of Visegrád, Archbishop Csanád Telegdi transcribed Pope Benedict's letter in June 1338. In the document, Sigfrid was styled as "visitor to the Holy See" ("visitator per sedem deputatus apostolicam") which proves his leading role in the Hungarian Benedictine reformist movement.

A general council of the Benedictine Order was held in Visegrád between 2 and 6 June 1342, which was co-chaired by Sigfrid alongside William Hammer, the abbot of Pannonhalma. One of the resolutions confirms that Sigfrid successfully recovered the aforementioned abbeys for the Benedictines. During this process, however, the Garamszentbenedek Abbey was forced to incur severe financial expenses. The general council ruled that the superiors of the five recovered abbeys had to compensate Sigfrid and his convent with 400 golden florins. In the spring of 1344, Sigfrid traveled to Avignon and petitioned three cases at the court of Pope Clement VI. Upon his request, the pope instructed the Benedictines in Hungary to strive to save the approximately 40 abbeys that have been declining since the Mongol invasion by implementation of a common budget and appointment of procurators in order to perform the necessary tasks. Sigfrid also managed to reach the Benedictines to take over the abandoned Greek-ryte abbey of Szávaszentdemeter in Syrmia (present-day Sremska Mitrovica, Serbia), when Pope Clement instructed Vid Vasvári, Bishop of Nyitra to accomplish it. Sigfrid and his allies were committed to establish an informal connection and a common political position among the Benedictine abbeys in Hungary. Beyond Garamszentbenedek, Sigfrid selflessly defended the interests of the minor and more modest income monasteries, using his influence and personal connections either in the Hungarian royal court or the Holy See. He also maintained good relationship with the professional staff of the judicial courts and the royal chapel. With his efforts, Sigfrid also gained opponents for himself: in June 1340, Boleslaus, the abbot of Báta that he had illegally and unjustly squandered the money of the Benedictines in Hungary. Boleslaus withdrew the charges before witnesses were present at Avignon, possibly under duress. Nevertheless, the momentum of the Hungarian Benedictine reform movement seems to be breaking after 1344. Beside his requests at Avignon, Sigfrid also performed papal mandates in Hungary during his abbacy. Along with Nicholas Neszmélyi, Bishop of Pécs and Daniel, the abbot of Visegrád, he was entrusted to investigate circumstances in favor of the establishment of the Diocese of Szepes (Spiš) by Pope Clement VI in April 1348. Subsequently, the investigators summoned all stakeholders in the region to examine the conditions for ascension in December 1348. Despite the efforts, Szepes remained a provostry for centuries.

Sigfrid was a confidant of King Louis I. According to historian Sarolta Homonnai, the experience gained during the reform of the Benedictines in Hungary provided him with sufficient legal and diplomatic knowledge to prove himself suitable and to have a place in creating the diplomatic background for the young Hungarian monarch's first Neapolitan campaign. In the preparatory phase, Sigfrid was sent to the court of King Edward III of England at the turn of 1345 and 1346 in order to gain the political alliance and support of English monarch. According to Edward's charter issued in March 1346, he had negotiated with the abbot and sent his envoy, friar Walter de Mora together with Sigfrid into Hungary. Walter's cost accounting narrates that the English legation had was forced to procrastinate because of Sigfrid, who had spent several days in the cities of the Holy Roman Empire and Hungary – Regensburg, Vienna and Székesfehérvár – during the church holidays, but it is also possible that he completed a diplomatic mission in Germany. They arrived to Zagreb, where Louis' royal camp was set up during the Siege of Zadar.

During his abbacy, Sigfrid has in several cases achieved the confirmation and renewal of the old privileges, rights and proprietary of the Garamszentbenedek Abbey, for instance in 1347 in the occasion of altogether eight royal charters by Louis I. He was also involved in various lawsuits over the lawful possession of landholdings with his neighbors. For instance, the town of Bars (present-day Starý Tekov, Slovakia) contested the abbey's ownership over the surrounding lands Zengő and Szőlen in the 1330s. After a lengthy lawsuit, Voivode Thomas Szécsényi ruled in favor of the Garamszentbenedek Abbey in 1341. Sigfrid also acquired the thirds of duty at Bars for his abbey in 1335, after the decision of Palatine William Drugeth during a general assembly in the province. Sigfrid also became embroiled in conflict with the influential Becsei family; during the same diet, he accused ispán Töttös Becsei that his late father Emeric arbitrarily modified the boundaries of their neighboring estates at Kovácsi (today Kozárovce, Slovakia). According to the verdict, Emeric Becsei usurped several lands and revenues of the abbey unlawfully during his lifetime. The abbey land of Knyezsic (today Žitavany, Slovakia) was stormed and looted by the troops of the neighboring Kistapolcsányi (or Tapolcsányi) family – including Nicholas, the king's former tutor, while several serfs were murdered or assaulted. Sigfrid had numerous conflicts with the Tapolcsányis thereafter, for instance in Malonya (present-day a borough of Tesárske Mlyňany, Slovakia). Sigfrid successfully recovered the village Barátka in Bars County for the Garamszentbenedek Abbey in 1347, after a long-standing trial. The abbot also tried to defend the monastery's interests and possessions in Tiszántúl (Transtisia), mostly laid in Csongrád County. During the litigation processes, Sigfrid hired professional lawyers, primarily a certain Mikó, son of Hippolytus, who acted in this capacity throughout from 1340 to 1365.

== Abbot of Pannonhalma ==
Sigfrid was transferred to the most important Benedictine monastery, the Pannonhalma Abbey in late 1354 or early 1355. Pope Innocent VI confirmed his election on 13 April 1355. His abbacy in Pannonhalma proved to be more passive due to his advanced age. In 1356, Pope Innocent VI ordered Sigfrid to install Nicholas Zsigrai, a canon of Esztergom as the new of provost of the collegiate chapter of Hánta (present-day a borough in Kisbér). In 1358 and 1361, at his request, Louis I of Hungary annulled all previous measures that undermined the monastery's property and rights. His name is associated with the late Gothic reconstruction of the abbey building in the local Benedictine historiography, but later excavations contradict this tradition. Sigfrid died on 11 March 1365. His ornate red marble tombstone has survived.

== Sources ==
- Homonnai, Sarolta (2001). "Egy bencés főpapi karrier: Szigfrid apát életútja (1300-as évek eleje–1365) [The Career of a Benedictine Prelate: Abbot Sigfrid (Beginning of 1300s–1365)]". Acta Universitatis Scientiarum Szegediensis: Acta Historica (in Hungarian). 115. University of Szeged: 55–65. ISSN 0324-6965.
- Keglevich, Kristóf (2012). A garamszentbenedeki apátság története az Árpád- és az Anjou-korban (1075–1403) [The History of the Abbey of Garamszentbenedek in the Age of the Árpád and Anjou Dynasties] (in Hungarian). Capitulum VIII, Toefl Bt. ISBN 978-963-306-181-7.
- Maléth, Ágnes (2020). A Magyar Királyság és a Szentszék kapcsolata I. Károly korában (1301–1342) [The Relationship of the Hungarian Kingdom and the Holy See in the time of Charles I (1301–1342)] (in Hungarian). Pécsi Tudományegyetem BTK TTI Középkori és Koraújkori Történeti Tanszék. ISBN 978-963-429-500-6.

Catholic Church titles
Preceded by Ladislaus	Abbot of Garamszentbenedek; 1330–1355	Succeeded by Ulrich
Preceded by William Hammer	Abbot of Pannonhalma; 1355–1365	Succeeded by Ladislaus Cudar
