= Cirill Hortobágyi =

Tamás Cirill Hortobágyi
- Archabbot of Pannonhalma Archabbey, Abbot-President of the Hungarian Benedictine Congregation
- Church: Roman Catholic Church
- See: Pannonhalma Archabbey
- Installed: 2018
- Predecessor: Asztrik Várszegi
- Previous post: Prior of Pannonhalma

Orders
- Ordination: 15 August 1985

Personal details
- Born: 22 February 1959 (age 67) Nagytálya, Hungary
- Denomination: Roman Catholic
- Education: Eötvös Loránd University
- Coat of arms

Tamás Cirill Hortobágyi (born February 22, 1959, in Nagytálya) is a Hungarian Catholic priest and Benedictine monk, currently serving as the Archabbot of Pannonhalma and Abbot-President of the Hungarian Benedictine Congregation.

== See also ==
- Order of Saint Benedict
- Pannonhalma Archabbey

Catholic Church titles
Preceded by Asztrik Várszegi	Archabbot of Pannonhalma; 2018-	Succeeded by incumbent
