= Bonipert =

Bishop in the Kingdom of Hungary

- Bishop of Pécs
- Province: Esztergom
- Diocese: Pécs
- Appointed: 1009
- Term ended: 1036
- Successor: Maurus

Personal details
- Died: 1042
- Denomination: Roman Catholic

Bonipert was the first bishop of Pécs in the Kingdom of Hungary between 1009 and 1036. Similarly to all the earliest prelates in the newly baptized kingdom, he was a foreigner, most probably from Lombardy or France. He seems to have resigned from his office five years before his death.

== Life ==
Most information on his life has been preserved in the Annales Posonienses and in a letter written by Bishop Fulbert of Chartres to him in the 1020s. Bonipert's correspondence with the Frankish prelate may reflect his French origin, but his name – which was quite frequently mentioned in charters issued in Lombardy around 1000 – suggests an Italian parentage. A third source, a list of the bishops of Pécs which had by now been lost stated that Bonipert had begun his career in Hungary as royal chaplain in the court of Stephen I, the first king of Hungary.

Bonipert was appointed to the see of Pécs in 1009 when the deed of foundation of the new diocese was issued in Győr in the presence of the papal legate, Azo. Accordingly, the organization of the bishopric must have begun under his auspices. However, only the establishment of a cathedral school at Pécs is documented, since Bonipert's request for a work by Priscian from Bishop Fulbert of Chartres must have been connected to it.

The Annales Posonienses relates that Bonipert's successor, Maurus became the bishop of Pécs in 1036, but Bonipert only died in 1042. Therefore Bonipert seems to have resigned from the bishopric, most probably because of his age or health. However, neither can it be excluded that King Stephen forced him to renounce for unknown reasons.

== Sources ==
- Berend, Nora; Laszlovszky, József; Szakács, Béla Zsolt (2007). "The kingdom of Hungary". In Berend, Nora (ed.). Christianization and the Rise of Christian Monarchy: Scandinavia, Central Europe and Rus', c.900-1200. Cambridge University Press. pp. 319–368. ISBN 978-0-521-87616-2.
- Fedeles, Tamás (2008). "Az egyházmegye alapítása [=The establishment of the diocese]". In Sümegi, József (ed.). A Pécsi Egyházmegye ezer éve [=Millennium of the Diocese of Pécs] (in Hungarian). Fény Kft. pp. 19–25. ISBN 978-963-85841-5-1.
- Koszta, László (2009). "Bonipert (1009-1036)". In Fedeles, Tamás; Sarbak, Gábor; Sümegi, József (eds.). A Pécsi Egyházmegye története I: A középkor évszázadai (1009-1543) [=A History of the Diocese of Pécs, Volume I: Medieval Centuries (1009-1543)] (in Hungarian). Fény Kft. pp. 57–59. ISBN 978-963-88572-0-0.

Bonipert Born: unknown Died: 1042
Catholic Church titles
Preceded by New creation	Bishop of Pécs; 1009–1036	Succeeded by Maurus
