= Asztrik Várszegi =

Hungarian Benedictine monk (born 1946)

Imre Asztrik Várszegi
- Archabbot Emeritus of Pannonhalma Archabbey, Titular Bishop of Culus
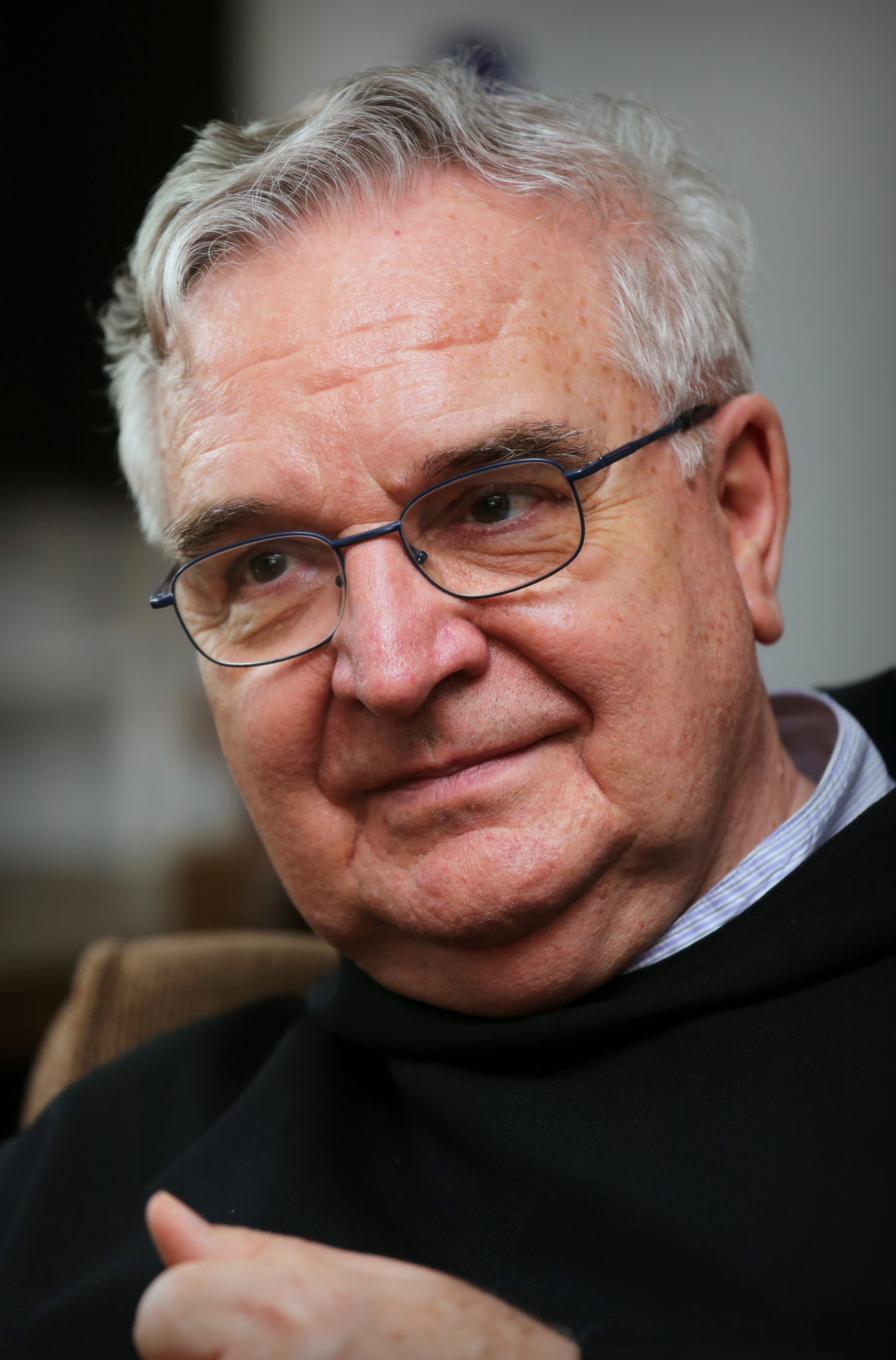
- Asztrik Várszegi in 2014
- Church: Roman Catholic Church
- See: Pannonhalma Archabbey
- In office: 1991–2018
- Predecessor: András Szennay
- Successor: Cirill Hortobágyi
- Previous post: Auxiliary Bishop of Esztergom-Budapest

Orders
- Ordination: 29 August 1971

Personal details
- Born: 26 January 1946 (age 80) Sopron, Hungary
- Denomination: Roman Catholic
- Coat of arms

Imre Asztrik Várszegi (born 26 January 1946) is a Hungarian Benedictine monk, who was ordained a priest on 29 August 1971. He served as Archabbot of the Pannonhalma Archabbey from 6 August 1991 to 16 February 2018. Previously, he functioned as Auxiliary Bishop of Esztergom between 1988 and 1991, and Titular Bishop of Culusi since then.

== See also ==
- Order of Saint Benedict
- Pannonhalma Archabbey

Catholic Church titles
Preceded by András Szennay	Archabbot of Pannonhalma; 1991–2018	Succeeded by Cirill Hortobágyi
