= Bakonybél Abbey =

Coordinates: 47.251525842755576°N 17.727741215278375°E

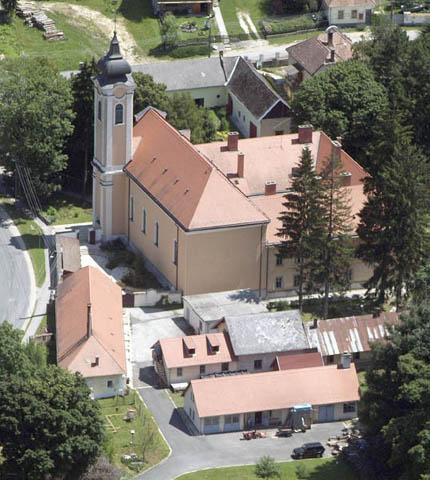
Bakonybél Abbey

The Bakonybél Abbey is a Benedictine monastery established at Bakonybél in the Kingdom of Hungary in the first decades of the 11th century. Its patron is Saint Maurice.

== History ==
The establishment of the monastery is connected to the activities of a Thuringian nobleman, Gunther. He entered the Niederaltaich Abbey in order to do penance for his earlier sins, but later became a hermit in the woodlands along the borders between Bavaria and Bohemia. He was related to Gisela of Bavaria, the queen of King Stephen I of Hungary, and often visited them in Hungary. Gunther even lived as hermit in the forests of the Bakony Hills near a royal manor at Veszprém around 1018. Upon his initiative, another saintly man, the Venetian Gerard – who was appointed to educate King Stephen's son, Emeric – built a chapel at the foot of a nearby hill where he spent seven years of his life as a hermit. Gunther persuaded, in 1037, King Stephen to erect a new chapel dedicated to Saint Maurice, transform his royal manor into a monastery and grant his nearby estates to it.

Currently the monastery is a part of the Hungarian Benedictine Congregation, as one of the dependent community of the Archabbey of Pannonhalma. The community has 5 members who pronounced eternal vows and 3 with a temporary vows.

== Sources ==
- Berend, Nora; Laszlovszky, József; Szakács, Béla Zsolt (2007). "The kingdom of Hungary". In Berend, Nora (ed.). Christianization and the Rise of Christian Monarchy: Scandinavia, Central Europe and Rus', c.900-1200. Cambridge University Press. pp. 319–368. ISBN 978-0-521-87616-2.
- Csóka, Gáspár (1994). "Bakonybél". In Kristó, Gyula; Engel, Pál; Makk, Ferenc (eds.). Korai magyar történeti lexikon (9-14. század) [=Encyclopedia of the Early Hungarian History (9th-14th centuries)] (in Hungarian). Akadémiai Kiadó. p. 77. ISBN 963-05-6722-9.
- Györffy, György (1994). King Saint Stephen of Hungary. Atlantic Research and Publications. ISBN 0-88033-300-6.
