= Pannonhalma Archabbey =

Benedictine abbey in Hungary

Millenary Benedictine Abbey of Pannonhalma and its Natural Environment
UNESCO World Heritage Site
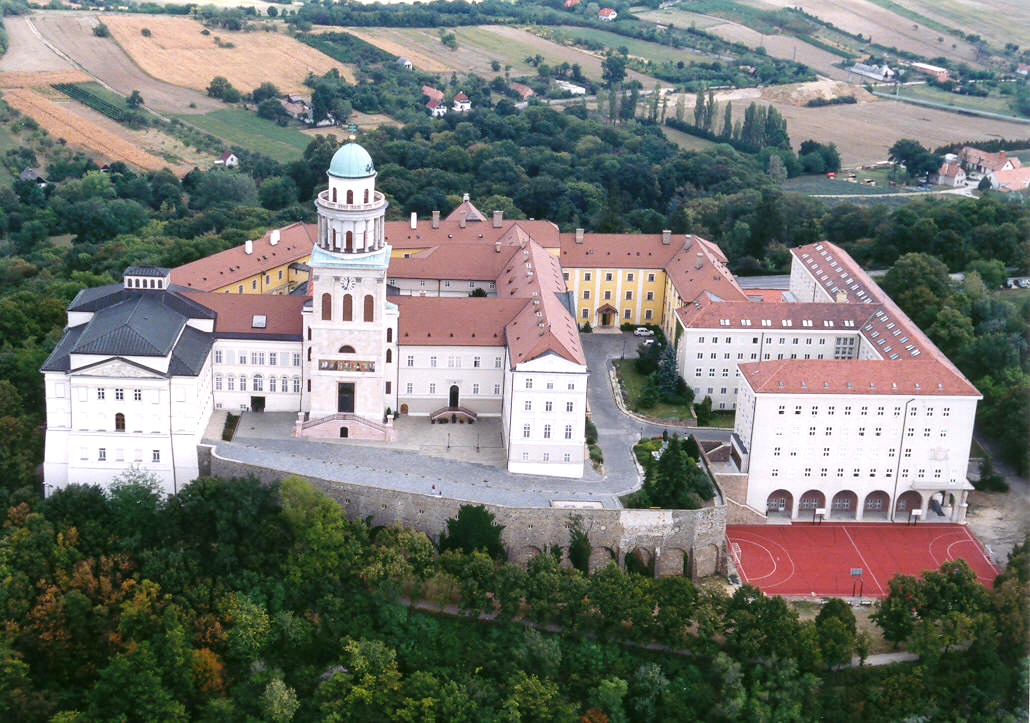
- Pannonhalma Archabbey

- Location within Hungary
- Location: Pannonhalma, Győr-Moson-Sopron County, Western Transdanubia, Transdanubia, Hungary
- Criteria: Cultural: (iv), (vi)
- Reference: 758
- Inscription: 1996 (20th Session)
- Area: 47.4 ha (117 acres)
- Buffer zone: 758 ha (1,870 acres)
- Website: https://bences.hu/lang/en/
- Coordinates: 47°33′10″N 17°45′40″E

The Benedictine Pannonhalma Archabbey or Territorial Abbey of Saint Martin on Mount Pannonhalma (lat. Archiabbatia or Abbatia Territorialis Sancti Martini in Monte Pannoniae) is a medieval building in Pannonhalma and one of the oldest historical monuments in Hungary. Founded in 996, it is located near the town, on top of a hill (282 m). Saint Martin of Tours is believed to have been born at the foot of this hill, hence its former name, Mount of Saint Martin (Hungarian: Márton-hegy), from which the monastery occasionally took the alternative name of Márton-hegyi Apátság. It is the second largest territorial abbey in the world, after the one in Monte Cassino.

Its sights include the Basilica with the Crypt (built in the 13th century), the Cloisters, the monumental Library with 400,000 volumes, the Baroque Refectory (with several examples of trompe-l'œil) and the Archabbey Collection (the second biggest in the country). Because of the exceptional architectural evolution of the abbey over its 1000-year history and its historical importance as an international cultural and religious center, the abbey and its surroundings were inscribed on the UNESCO World Heritage List in 1996.

About 50 monks live in the monastery. The abbey is supplemented by the Benedictine High School, a boys' boarding school.

== History ==
It was founded as the first Hungarian Benedictine monastery in 996 by Prince Géza, who designated this as a place for the monks to settle, and then it soon became the centre of the Benedictine order. The monastery was built in honour of Saint Martin of Tours. Géza's son, King Stephen I donated estates and privileges to the monastery. Astrik (Anastasius) served as its first abbot.

The oldest surviving document to use the Hungarian language, the Charter of the Tihany Benedictine Abbey, dating back to 1055, is still preserved in the library. In 1096, on his way to the holy lands as leader of one of three crusader armies, Duke Godfrey of Bouillon spent a week here negotiating his army's safe passage through Hungary from King Coloman. The first buildings of the community were destroyed in 1137, then rebuilt. The Basilica's pillars and the early Gothic vault were built in the early 13th century, using the walls of the former church. In 1486, the abbey was reconstructed under King Matthias in the Gothic style.

The monastery became an archabbey in 1541, and as a result of Ottoman incursions into Europe in the 16th and 17th centuries it was fortified. During one and a half centuries of the occupation of Hungary by the Ottoman Empire, the monks had to abandon the abbey for varying amounts of time. Only later were they able to start the reconstruction of the damaged buildings. During the time of Archabbot Benedek Sajghó (1722-1768), a major baroque construction was in progress in the monastery.

In the 17th and 18th centuries, rich Baroque adornments and extensions were added to the complex and much of its current facade dates from this time. It received its present form in 1832, with the library and the tower, which was built in classicist style. The 18th century, the era of the Enlightenment also influenced the life of the monasteries. The state and the monarchs judged the operation of the communities according to immediate utility, by and large tolerating only those orders which practised nursing and education. For these reasons the Archabbey was closed in 1786 and re-opened in 1802.

In the 1860s, Ferenc Storno organised major renovations, mostly in the basilica.

After 1945, Hungary became a communist state, and in 1950, the properties of the Order and the schools run by the Benedictines were confiscated by the state, not to be returned until after the end of communism in Hungary. In 1995, one year before the millennium, the complex was entirely reconstructed and renovated. In 1996, "the Millenary Benedictine Abbey of Pannonhalma and its Natural Environment" was elected among the World Heritage sites.

An infestation of drugstore beetles was discovered in a section of the library in 2025. The beetles had burrowed into book spines, leaving layers of dust on the shelves. In response, the abbey began a disinfection project for 100,000 of the books, placing crates of books in plastic bags from which the oxygen is removed. The process was anticipated to take six weeks, after which the books will be vacuumed and inspected for damage.

=== List of abbots ===
Abbots from 997 to the present
  - Asztrik 997-1015
  - Rasia 1015-b. 1029
  - St Maurus b. 1029-1036
  - ... 10??-1091
  - Péter 1091-1103
  - ... 1103-1124
  - Deda 1124-1131
  - Dávid 1131-1150
  - Rafael 1151-1175
  - Rajnald 1175-1180
  - Simili 1180-1189
  - Péter 1189-1192
  - Bálazs 1192-1198
  - János 1198-1201
  - ... 1201-1207
  - Uros 1207-1241
  - ... 1241-1249
  - Salamon 1249-1252
  - Favus 1252-1262
  - Bonifác 1263-1288
  - Herman 1288-1300
  - Miklós I 1300-1306
  - Imre(Henrik) 1306-1307
  - Jakab 1307-1308
  - János 1308-1309
  - László 1309-1311
  - Miklós II 1312-1318
  - Miklós III 1319-1333
  - Hammer Vilmos 1333-1354
  - Szigfrid 1355-1365
  - László Czudar 1365-1372
  - Domonkos 1372-1377
  - László Piaszt der Weiße 1377-1379
  - István 1380-1398
  - Miklós Ferenc Marczali Dózsa 1399-1404
  - János Albeni 1404-1406
  - Konrád Ovári 1406-1408
  - János Kropidló 1408-1421
  - Miklós Dobói 1422-1438
  - László Héderváry 1439-1447
  - Tamás Döbrentei 1447-1467
  - János Vitéz 1467-1472
  - Mátyás Király 1472-1490
  - Tamás Bakóc 1490-1492
  - László Király 1493-1500
  - Mátyás Tolnai 1500-1535
  - Mihály Giöry 1535-1542
  - Ferenc Bedegi Nyáry 1543-1547
  - János Csanády 1548-1556
  - László Martonfalvi 1556-1562
  - Péter Bocsi Thorday 1563-1566
  - István Fejérkövy 1567-1593
  - ... 1593-1638
  - Mátyás Pálffy 1638-1646
  - Placid Magger 1647-1667
  - ... 1667-1689
  - Placid Lendvay 1689-1699
  - Egyed Karner 1699-1708
  - ... 1708-1722
  - Benedek Sajghó 1722-1768
  - Sámuel Vajda 1768-1795
  - Dániel Somogyi 1795-1801
  - ... 1801-1829
  - Mór Czinár 1829-1841
  - Mihály Rimely 1842-1865
  - Krizosztom Károly Kruesz 1865-1885
  - ... 1885-1892
  - Lipót Fehér 1892-1910
  - Tibor Hajdu 1910-1918
  - ... 1918-1920
  - Remig Bárdos 1920-1932
  - Krizosztom Ferenc Kelemen 1933-1950
  - Pál Sárközy 1951-1957
  - Norbert Béla Legányi 1957-1969
  - ... 1969-1973
  - András Szennay 1973-1991
  - Asztrik Várszegi 1991-2018
  - Tamás Cirill Hortobágyi 2018-

=== Events ===
Pannonhalma was visited, among others, by Alexius II, Patriarch of Moscow in 1994, Pope John Paul II in 1996 and Patriarch Bartholomew I of Constantinople and the Dalai Lama in 2000. In 2005, a film was made about the archabbot, Asztrik Várszegi, titled A közvetítő ("The mediator"). Stéphanie, Crown Princess of Austria died here and her remains were interred here in 1945.

In July 2011, the heart of former Crown Prince of Austria and Hungary Otto von Habsburg was buried in Pannonhalma Archabbey, in line with family tradition.

== The building complex ==
=== Basilica and crypt ===
The present church of Pannonhalma, a crowning achievement of the early Gothic style, was built at the beginning of the 13th century during the reign of Abbot Uros, and was consecrated most likely in 1224. Recent archaeological findings under the floor level of the west end of the basilica date from the 11th century. The oldest segment currently seen in the basilica is the wall of the southern aisle. Dating from the 12th century, it is a remnant of the second church to stand on the site, consecrated in 1137 during the reign of Abbot Dávid.

During the archaeological excavations two walled-up gates were found in the sacristy. One of these could have presumably been the northern entrance of Abbot Dávid's church, while the other that of Abbot Uros'. Also found under the floor between the front altar and the sanctuary steps was a grave, most likely that of Abbot Uros.

The church was extended during the reign of King Matthias, in which the present-day ceiling of the sanctuary, the eastern ends of the aisles and the Saint Benedict chapel were completed. During the Turkish occupation the furnishings were entirely destroyed. The most significant renovation after the occupation started in the 1720s, under Archabbot Benedek Sajghó. Ferenc Storno was the last to undertake a major renovation of the church in the 1860s. At this time the main altar, the pulpit, the frescoes of the ceiling, and the upper-level stained glass window depicting Saint Martin were added.

=== Porta Speciosa and the cloister ===
In the Middle Ages one of the main entrances to the church was the Porta Speciosa (ornate entrance). This portal leads to the church from the cloister (quadrum or quadratura) and it was crafted also in the 13th century. In the Renaissance Pannonhalma was rather depopulated (with not more than 6 or 7 monks). Under King Matthias' rule, in 1472, today's cloister was created. The constructions were probably finished in 1486, as it is testified by the inscription on one of the cornerstones. The work was presumably conducted by craftsmen of the Visegrád Royal Workshop of Construction.

The small inner garden surrounded by the cloister was also called Paradisum (Paradise) metaphorically creating an earthly imitation of Biblical Paradise. In medieval times mainly herbs were grown here so that those in need would recover the body in its wholeness and health as it was in Paradise.

=== Library ===
The library was finished in the first third of the 19th century. The longitudinal part of the building was planned and built by Ferenc Engel in the 1820s. Later János Packh was commissioned with extending the edifice, and the oval hall is his work. Joseph Klieber, a Vienna master was asked to ornament the interior of the building.

On the four sides of the oval hall's ceiling the allegories of the four medieval university faculties can be seen: Law, Theology, Medicine and the Arts. The holdings of the library have been increasing ever since. Manuscripts from the time of Saint László have been catalogued in Pannonhalma. 400,000 volumes are kept in the collection. The library includes tens of thousands of 16th-century books, hundreds of manuscripts from before the invention of the printing press, a 13th-century Bible, and 19 codices.

=== Baroque refectory ===
In the 18th century Archabbot Benedek Sajghó (1722–1768) had the Carmelite brother Atanáz Márton Witwer design the baroque elements of the monastery. The construction of the two-story high, rectangular shaped hall with cavetto vault probably dates to the second half of the 1720s. The paintings (secco) on the walls were created between 1728 and 1730 by Davide Antonio Fossati, a Swiss artist who later settled in Venice. The secco on the ceiling depicts the apotheosis of King Saint Stephen. The six well-known Biblical scenes on the side-walls are thematically connected to eating: the offering of vinegar to Christ on the Cross; the temptation of Jesus in the desert; Daniel in the lions' lair; the feast of King Balthasar; the decapitation of Saint John, the Baptist; and a scene from the life of Saint Benedict.

=== The Millennium Monument ===
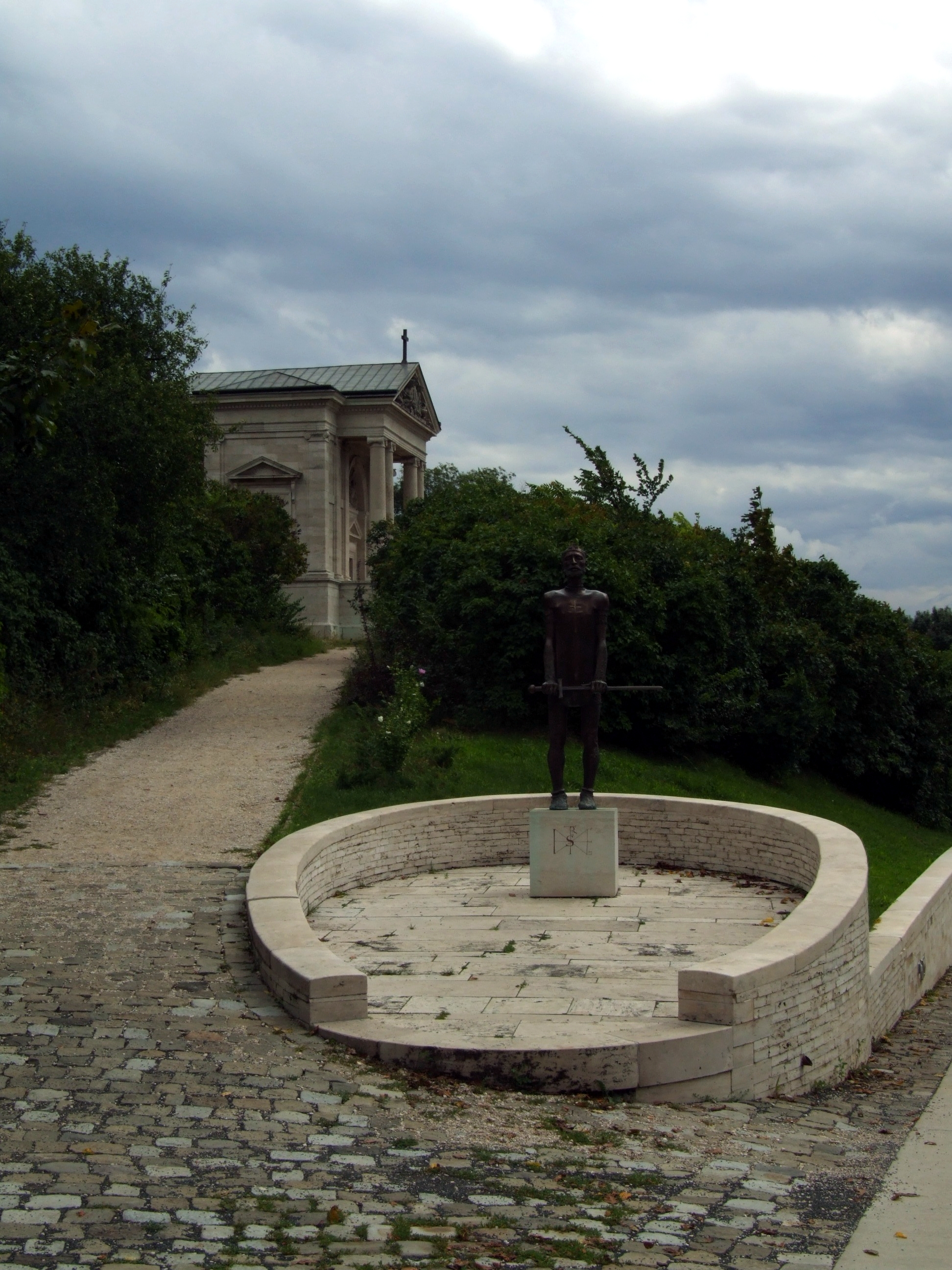
Millennium Monument (on the left)

In order to celebrate the millennium of the Magyars' settlement in 896, seven monuments were erected in the Carpathian Mountain Basin in 1896. One of them can still be seen today in Pannonhalma. The edifice was originally covered by a 26-metre high, double-shell dome with a colossal brass relief on it representing the Hungarian royal crown. Due to its deterioration, however, the outer shell had to be dismantled in 1937–1938, and the building took its present form. Two windows shed light on the interior, a circular, undivided room covered by a low dome (i.e. the original inner shell). The unfinished fresco decorating the eastern wall is an allegorical vision of the Foundation of the Hungarian state and was painted by Vilmos Aba-Novák in 1938.

=== Our Lady Chapel ===
The construction of the Our Lady Chapel began in 1714. Originally it was a place of worship for the non-native population living in the vicinity of the abbey. The chapel, with its three baroque altars and small, 18th-century organ, was renovated in 1865, at which time the romantic ornamentation of the walls and the portal took place. The crypt beneath the church has served as the burial place of the monks for centuries. Near the Chapel stands a look-out tower from wood.

=== Arboretum (Botanical Garden) ===
In 1830 as many as 80 tree and bush species were to be found on the Archabbey's lands. It was through the design of Fábián Szeder in the 1840s that the current form of the arboretum took shape. Today the arboretum has more than 400 tree and bush species, many of which are rare species and varieties in Hungary.

== Present uses ==
=== Archives ===
The Pannonhalma Archives of the Benedictine Archabbey contains one of the richest and most valuable collections of documents from the first centuries of Hungarian statehood. It includes the monastery's interpolated charter (1001–1002) from Saint Stephen, the founding charter of the Tihany Abbey (1055), the first known written text to include Hungarian words and phrases. The records of the medieval Pannonhalma, a monastery with the rights to issue official documents (locus authenticus), and the records of the Bakonybél, the Tihany and the Dömölk abbeys constitute separate entities. The archive collects documents from the archabbot's office, the Theological School and the former Teacher Training School of the order, the former and current secondary schools, the dependent Benedictine houses, the finance offices of the Archabbey, and from the documentation of the parishes that belong to the so-called Territorial Abbey: a quasi-diocese under the authority of the Archabbey. Partially as deposit, partially as inheritance, the archives of the Guary, the Somogyi, the Chernel, the Kende, the Erdődy and the Lónyay families came into the collection. The amount of the archive's holdings is 192 running metres.

=== Szent Gellért College of Theology ===
There is a College of Theology functioning in the archabbey, named after Saint Gerard of Csanád.

=== Winery ===
Wine making started in the Pannonhalma-Sokoróalja region when Benedictine monks founded the monastery of Pannonhalma in 996. Social and political turmoil following World War II made it impossible to continue the centuries-old traditions, since both the properties and the winery were taken over by the Communist state. In the ensuing decades, monks living in Pannonhalma did not give up hope of resuscitating their wine-making traditions. Since the fall of Communism, the monks have revived the viticultural traditions and the wineries. In 2000, the abbey repurchased vineyards that had been confiscated by the Communists and began replanting grape vines in the same year. The winery is situated on a 2000 m^{2} plot with a capacity of 3000 hls. The main grape varieties are Rhine Riesling, Sauvignon blanc, Gewürztraminer, Welschriesling, Ezerjó and Sárfehér. In addition, they have planted the more international Chardonnay, Pinot blanc, Pinot noir, Merlot and Cabernet Franc. They currently have 37 hectares under newly planted vines and the first harvest took place in autumn 2003.

== Surroundings ==
Around the monastery one can find the following:

- Way of the Cross (Baroque, 1724)
- Blessed Maurice Lookout Tower in the woods nearby

== See also ==
Further settlements of the Benedictine Order in Hungary are: Győr, Tihany, Bakonybél, Budapest.

- Catholic Church in Hungary
- List of cathedrals in Hungary

== Sources ==
- Csóka G., Szovák K., Takács I. (2000): Pannonhalma - Képes kalauz a bencés Főapátság történetéhez és nevezetességeihez. (Guide to Pannonhalma Archabbey: history and sightseeings). Pannonhalmi Főapátság, Pannonhalma
- Hapák J. (2000): Pannonhalma. Magyar Könyvklub, Pannonhalmi Főapátság (ISBN 963 547 158 0)
- Hapák J., Sólymos Sz. (2008): Pannonhalma. Kossuth Könyvkiadó, Pannonhalmi Főapátság (ISBN 978-963-09-5750-2)
- Gerevich T. (1938): Magyarország románkori emlékei. (Die romanische Denkmäler Ungarns.) Egyetemi nyomda. Budapest
- Szőnyi O. (É.n.): Régi magyar templomok. Alte Ungarische Kirchen. Anciennes églises Hongroises. Hungarian Churches of Yore. A Műemlékek Országos Bizottsága. Mirályi Magyar Egyetemi Nyomda, Budapest
- Henszlmann, I. (1876): Magyarország ó-keresztyén, román és átmeneti stylü mű-emlékeinek rövid ismertetése, (Old-Christian, Romanesque and Transitional Style Architecture in Hungary). Királyi Magyar Egyetemi Nyomda, Budapest
- Genthon I. (1959): Magyarország műemlékei. (Architectural Heritage of Hungary). Budapest
