= Pannonhalma =

- Town
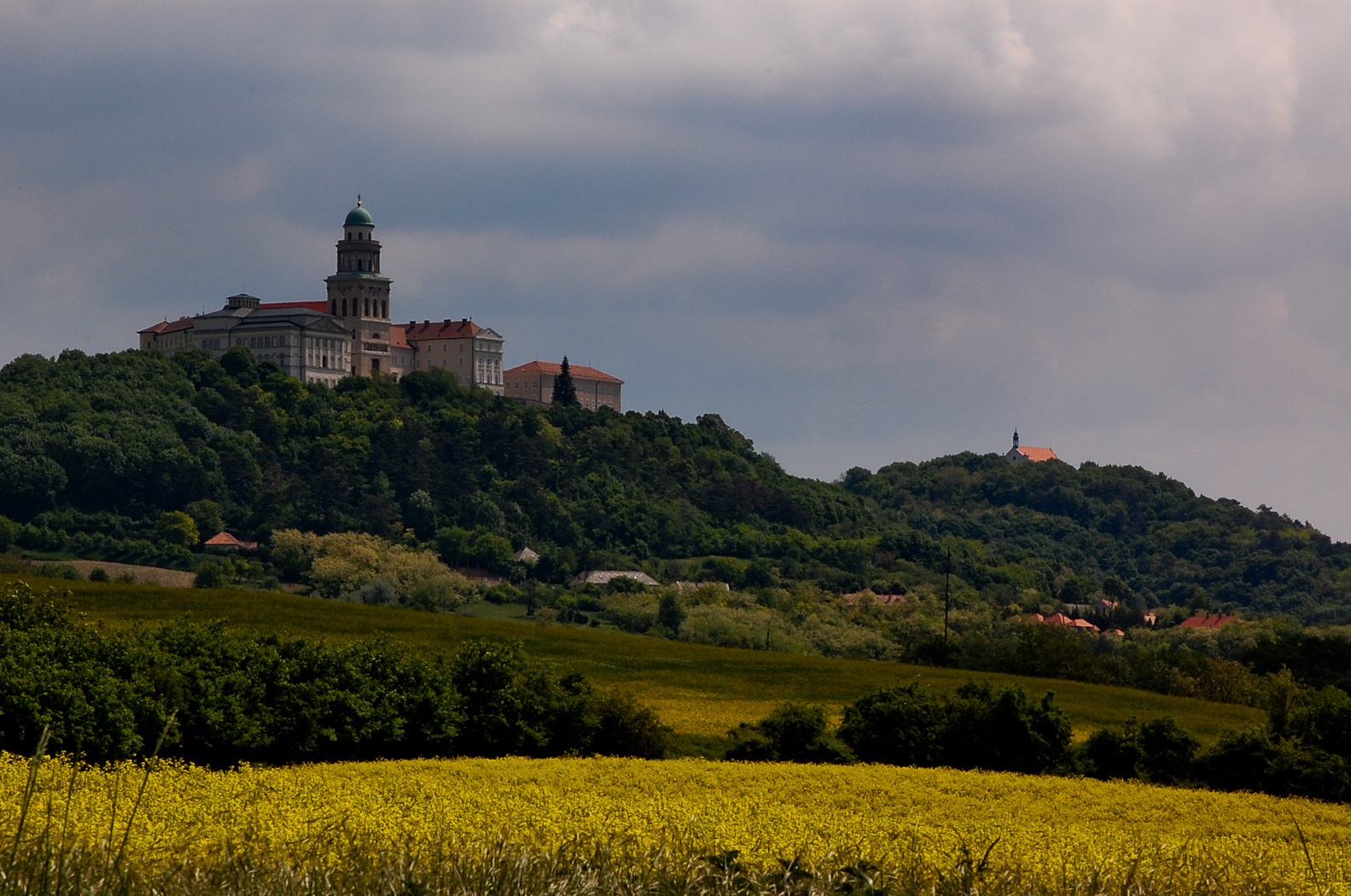
- The Benedictine Pannonhalma Archabbey

- Flag Coat of arms

- Location within Hungary
- Coordinates: 47.54680°N 17.74992°E

Area
  - Total: 29.58 km^{2} (11.42 sq mi)

Population (2008)
  - Total: 3,948
- Postal code: 9090
- Area code: (+36) 96

UNESCO World Heritage Site
- Official name: Pannonhalma Archabbey
- Criteria: Cultural: iv, vi
- Reference: 758
- Inscription: 1996 (20th Session)
- Extensions: 2002

Pannonhalma (Hungarian pronunciation: [ˈpɒnːonɦɒlmɒ]; German: Martinsberg; Slovak: Rábsky Svätý Martin), called Győrszentmárton until 1965, is a town in Győr-Moson-Sopron county in western Hungary. With a little under 4,000 inhabitants, it is about 20 km (12 mi) south-southeast of Győr. Pannonhalma is home to the oldest extant religious and educational institution in Hungary, the Benedictine Pannonhalma Archabbey, which is a UNESCO World Heritage Site and major touristic destination.

== History ==
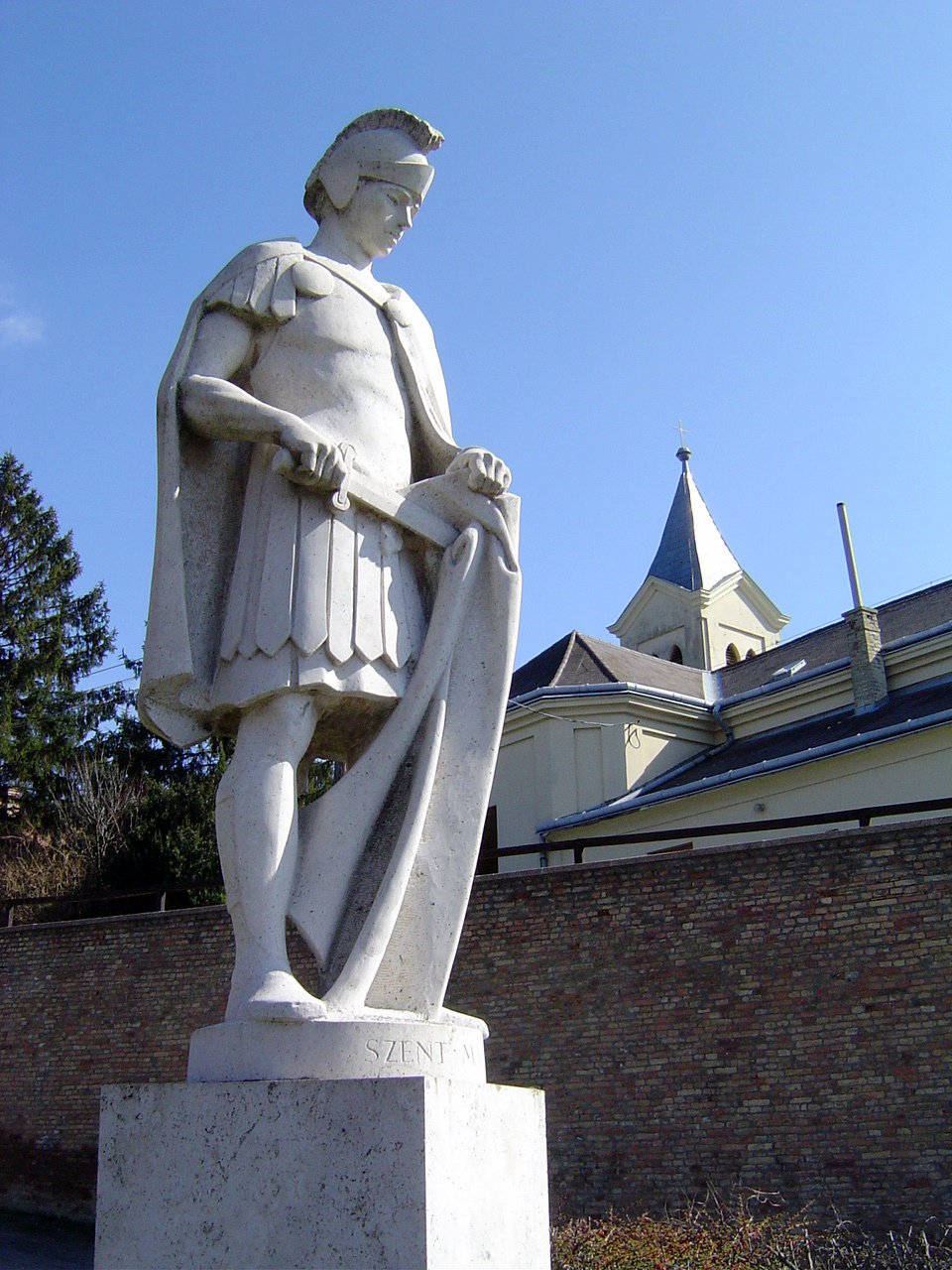
Statue of Szent Márton (Martin of Tours)

The town, known as Győrszentmárton until 1965, is dominated by its most famous landmarks: the thousand-year-old Pannonhalma Archabbey and the Benedictine Secondary School, which are situated above the village, on Szent Marton Hill. The hill itself is still known by this ancient name and the name 'Pannonhalma' was introduced as part of the Hungarian language reforms in the nineteenth century. The association with Saint Martin ('Szent Márton' in Hungarian) derives from a belief that Martin of Tours was born here, though others believe he was born in nearby Szombathely.

There is a small statue in the town at the crossroads under the abbey which shows the saint as a Roman soldier, cutting his cloak according to the legend associated with him. The wall behind this is part of the original fortifications which were built in 1569 as a result of incursions into Western Hungary by the Ottoman Turks. The area remained a moving frontier between the Ottoman Empire and the Habsburg monarchy for the following 140 years and the town suffered considerable damage during this time.

From at least the nineteenth century, Szent Marton had a significant Jewish community. They played an important role in the commerce of village, as it was then, until the latter years of World War II. In 1944, the remaining Jewish families were rounded up and sent to extermination camps. A small synagogue, built in the late 1800s, remains on the main street, though it is no longer in use. The building is in the process of being restored and a monument has been constructed on the street in front of it. Some dozens of Jews were protected in the abbey when it was taken under control of the International Red Cross in October 1944, along with 3,000 other refugees, many of them children, thanks to the efforts of a Swiss national, Eduard Benedek Brunschweiler. The IRC was expelled from Pannonhalma by the Red Army in April 1945.

In 1996, parts of the town were included in UNESCO's demarcation of the Abbey as a World Heritage Site. Four years later, the village of Pannonhalma was officially granted 'town' status.

== Amenities ==
Apart from local food and hardware stores, the town also has a number of coffee houses and pubs, wine cellars and two restaurants. There are two in the centre by a church and lower by a supermarket (Coop). By the church are a wine cellar, restaurants, coffee house, pubs, bank ATM, and post office. By the supermarket are stores, clinic for outpatients, pharmacy, elementary school, ambulance, police, fire-station.

== Transport ==
There are regular commuter trains and local bus services to and from Győr. There are 4 bus direct to the archabbey a day. The railway station is situated at the lower end of the town at the bottom of a slope which rises more steeply at its end as it reaches the archabbey at the top of Szent Marton Hill, a distance of about 1.5 km (0.9 mi). Local bus services stop by church, in the top part of the town, closer to the archabbey. Over 100,000 tourists visit Pannonhalma each year, though most see little of the town itself. Tour buses normally stop at the car park near the modern reception centre towards the top of the hill, where there is good access for disabled visitors. There is a restaurant and small gift shop next to this car park, and it has good views over the surrounding countryside.

== Wine ==
There are a number of arable farms in the area and many smallholders still grow grapes, often to make their own wine. Many gardens built on a slope include a small wine cellar excavated out of the soft sandstone.

The Pannonhalma-Sokoró wine region consists of 630 hectares and the main white grape varieties grown here are Pinot gris, Chardonnay, Rhine and Italian Riesling, Királyleányka, and Traminer (Gewürztraminer). An Ice wine variety is also produced from Riesling. There are fewer red wines in this area; the most widespread is Kékfrankos.

== Twin towns — sister cities ==
Pannonhalma is twinned with:

- Engen, Germany
- Červený Kostelec, Czech Republic
- Dolné Saliby, Slovakia
