= Ajtony =

11th century ruler of Banat

Ajtony, Ahtum or Achtum (Hungarian: Ajtony, Bulgarian: Охтум, Romanian: Ahtum, Serbian: Ахтум) was an early-11th-century ruler in the territory now known as Banat in present Romania and Serbia. His primary source is the Long Life of Saint Gerard, a 14th-century hagiography. Ajtony was a powerful ruler who owned many horses, cattle and sheep and was baptised according to the Orthodox rite in Vidin. He taxed salt which was transferred to King Stephen I of Hungary on the Mureș River. The king sent Csanád, Ajtony's former commander-in-chief, against him at the head of a large army. Csanád defeated and killed Ajtony, occupying his realm. In the territory, at least one county and a Roman Catholic diocese were established.

Historians disagree on the year of Ajtony's defeat; it may have occurred in 1002, 1008 or between 1027 and 1030. His ethnicity is also a subject of historical debate; he may have been Hungarian, Kabar or Pecheneg.

== Background ==
1597 edition of the Long Life of Saint Gerard

The Magyars (or Hungarians), who had lived on the Pontic steppe for decades, invaded the Carpathian Basin after their defeat by a coalition of Bulgarians and Pechenegs about 895 AD. Byzantine Emperor Constantine Porphyrogenitus wrote that the seven Magyar tribes formed a confederation with the Kabars. Although the Kabars had originally lived in the Khazar Khaganate, they rebelled against the Khazars and joined the Magyars on the Pontic steppe.

According to churchman Regino of Prüm, Constantine Porphyrogenitus and other contemporary sources, the Magyars fought the Bavarians, Bulgarians, Carinthians, Franks and Moravians in the Carpathian Basin. Among the Magyars' opponents the same sources noted many local rulers, including Svatopluk I of Moravia, Luitpold of Bavaria and Braslav, Duke of Lower Pannonia. The Gesta Hungarorum—the earliest extant Hungarian chronicle, written after 1150—instead mentioned Glad, lord of the lands between the Danube and the Mureș (now known as the Banat in Romania and Serbia) and other local rulers absent from the earlier sources. Therefore, the credibility of the Gesta reports is a subject of scholarly debate. Although Vlad Georgescu, Ioan Aurel Pop and other historians describe Glad as one of the local Romanian rulers who attempted to resist the invading Hungarians, other scholars—including Pál Engel and György Györffy—call him one of the dozen "imaginary figures" invented by Anonymus (author of the Gesta) as foes in the Hungarian conquest of the Carpathian Basin.

Constantine Porphyrogenitus identified "the whole settlement of Turkey" (Hungary) with the basins of five rivers—the Criș, Mureș, Timiș, Tisza and the unidentified "Toutis"—around 950, indicating that the land east of the Tisza was ruled by the Hungarians at that time. The emperor apparently received information about the Carpathian Basin situation from Termatzus, Bulcsú and Gylas, three Hungarian chieftains who visited Constantinople during the mid-10th century. According to Byzantine historian John Skylitzes, Bulcsú and Gylas were baptised during their visit. Bulcsú, Skylitzes wrote, still "violated his contract with God and often invaded" the Byzantine Empire; Gylas, however, "remained faithful to Christianity" and made no further inroads against the empire. Skylitzes also mentioned a Greek monk, Hierotheos, who was ordained bishop for the Hungarians. Hierotheos accompanied Gylas back to Hungary and "converted many from the barbaric fallacy to Christianity". Most 10th-century Byzantine coins and artifacts have been unearthed around the confluence of the Tisza and the Mureș, particularly in the Banat. Tudor Sălăgean, Florin Curta and other historians posit that Gylas's lands must have been in these territories, but their theory is not universally accepted.

Unlike Gylas, who chose the Eastern Orthodox Church, Géza, Grand Prince of the Hungarians, opted for Western Christianity and a cleric from the Holy Roman Empire (according to most scholars, Bruno from the Abbey of Saint Gall) baptised him during the 970s. Thietmar of Merseburg and other 11th-century authors emphasized that Géza was a cruel ruler, suggesting that the unification of the Hungarian chieftains' lands began under him. Géza was succeeded by his son, Stephen, who was crowned the first king of Hungary in 1000 or 1001.

== In primary sources ==
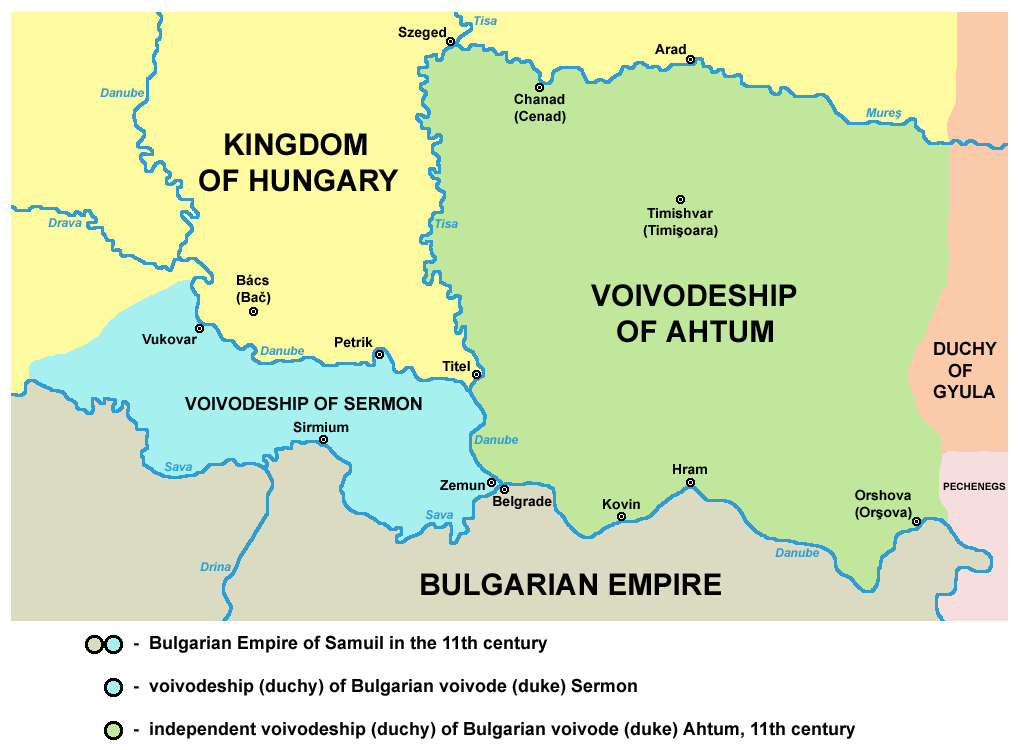
Ajtony's realm

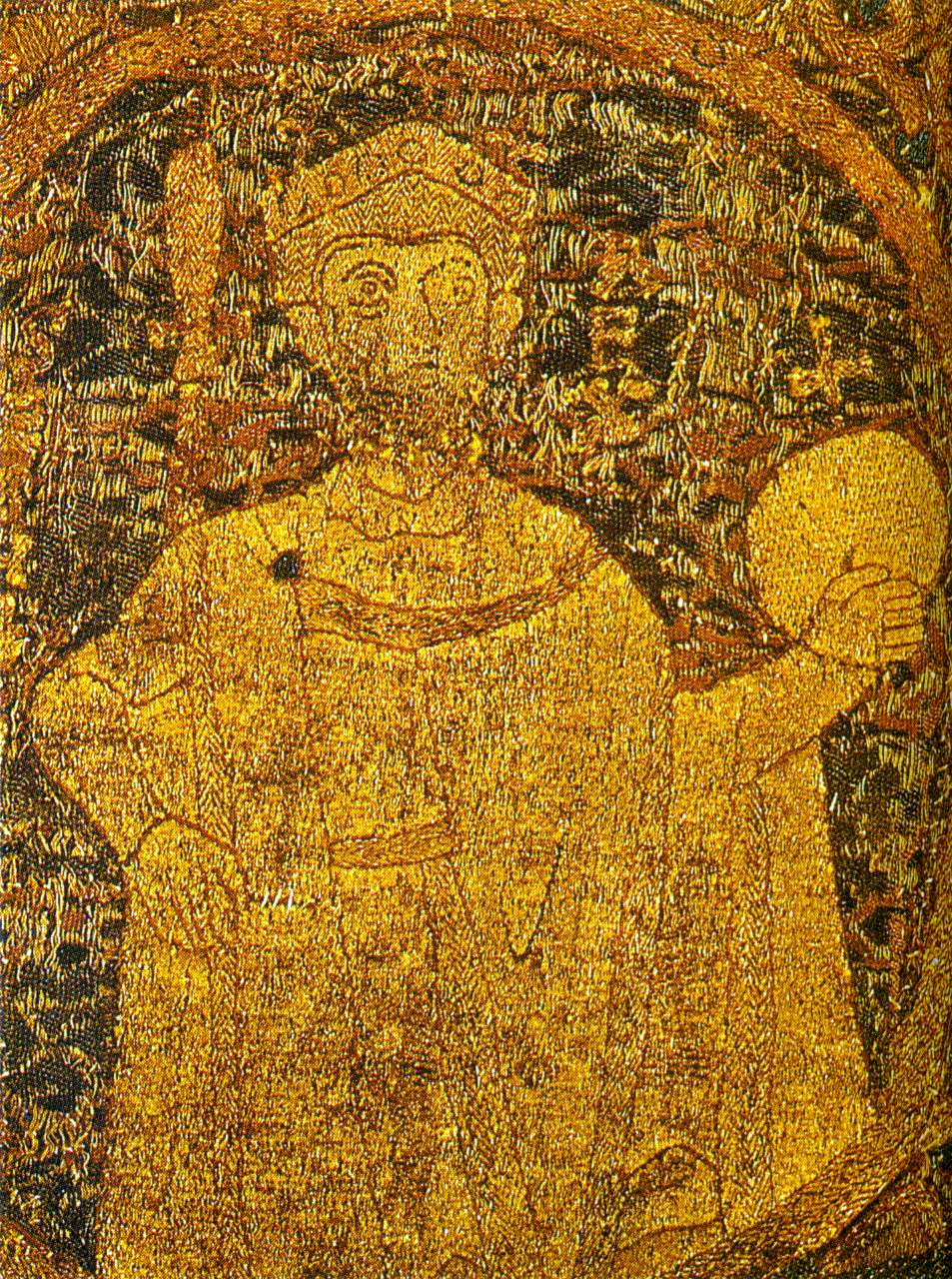
Stephen I of Hungary, whose army conquered Ajtony's realm, on the Hungarian coronation pall (made in 1031)

The principal source of Ajtony's life is the Long Life of Saint Gerard, compiled from a number of earlier sources in the early 14th century. According to modern historians (including Carlile Aylmer Macartney and Florin Curta), all information on Ajtony incorporated into the Long Life was based on a ballad about the heroic deeds of Csanád—Ajtony's former commander-in-chief—because a shorter version of Bishop Gerard of Csanád's life does not mention Ajtony. Most historians agree that the ballad was composed shortly after Ajtony's death. In addition to the Long Life, Ajtony is mentioned in the Gesta Hungarorum; the Hungarian chronicle was written after around 1150. According to the Gesta, Ajtony was descended from Glad (in the same source, lord of the Banat); however, its credibility is questioned. In a 1499 sermon the Franciscan Osvát Laskai wrote that Ajtony was from the Nyírség region, but no evidence exists to indicate that Laskai knew his place of birth.

Ajtony's name, recorded in the earliest sources as "Ohtun" or "Achtum", is of Turkic origin. According to linguist Loránd Benkő, his name is rooted in the Turkic word for golden (altun) and changed in Hungarian. Place names also echo his name; an abbey named Ahtunmonustura (Ajtony's monastery) existed in Csanád County and a village (Ahthon) in Krassó County, and a settlement named Aiton exists in Romania.

According to the Long Life, Ajtony's seat was a stronghold on the Mureș (urbs Morisena). His realm extended from the Criș in the north to the Danube in the south, and from the Tisza in the west to Transylvania in the east. Ajtony was a wealthy ruler who owned horses, cattle and sheep, and was powerful enough to establish customs offices and guards along the Mureș and tax salt carried to Stephen I of Hungary on the river.

Originally a pagan, Ajtony was baptised according to the Greek rite in Vidin. Shortly after his baptism, he established a monastery for Greek monks at his seat which was dedicated to John the Baptist. Ajtony remained polygamous, with seven wives after his baptism. In the Long Life Ajtony "had taken his power from the Greeks", suggesting that he accepted the Byzantine emperor's suzerainty.

Ajtony's commander-in-chief was Csanád, described in the Gesta Hungarorum as the "son of Doboka and nephew" of King Stephen. Accused of conspiring against Ajtony, Csanád fled to Stephen; the king prepared to conquer Ajtony's realm, placing Csanád at the head of a large army. After crossing the Tisza, the royal army engaged Ajtony's troops but was forced to withdraw. In a second battle, Stephen's army routed Ajtony's troops near modern Banatsko Aranđelovo or at Tomnatic. Csanád killed Ajtony, either on the battlefield (according to the Long Life) or in his stronghold on the Mureș (according to the Gesta Hungarorum). In the Long Life Csanád cut out Ajtony's tongue after his death, enabling him to prove that he had killed Ajtony (and exposing Gyula, who had taken credit for the deed in Stephen's presence). Archaeologist István Erdélyi said that the Treasure of Sânnicolau Mare, excavated near Ajtony's seat, was connected to the ruler; however, his view has not been universally accepted by scholars.

King Stephen granted large estates to Csanád in the lands Ajtony had ruled. Ajtony's stronghold, now known as Cenad (Hungarian: Csanád), was named for Stephen's commander. The king also appointed Csanád the head (or ispán) of the county made up of Ajtony's former realm. Stephen established a Roman Catholic diocese in Cenad, with the Venetian monk Gerard its first bishop. The Greek monks from Cenad were transferred to a new monastery built by Csanád at Banatsko Aranđelovo. Ajtony's descendants owned land in the region, indicating that King Stephen had not confiscated all of his predecessor's domain.

== In modern historiography ==
Ajtony's ethnicity is debated. Historian Paul Stephenson described him as a Magyar chieftain; according to historian László Makkai, he was of Kabar origin and his Turkic name may imply that he was a Pecheneg. According to historian Florin Curta he could be Bulgar, Khazar or Pecheneg. In Romanian historiography, Ajtony has been considered the last member of a "native" dynasty descended from Glad, who is mentioned in the Gesta Hungarorum as opposing the invading Hungarians, historian Alexandru Madgearu wrote that the Latin name of Ajtony's seat (urbs Morisena) preserved a Romanian form.

The date of Ajtony's conquest is also uncertain. His close contacts with the Byzantine Empire, including his "Greek rite" baptism in Vidin, show that he ruled after the Byzantine Emperor Basil II seized Vidin from the Bulgarians in 1002. The conflict between Ajtony and King Stephen must have occurred before the king appointed Gerard the first bishop of Csanád in 1030. Alexandru Madgearu, who called Ajtony an ally of Samuel of Bulgaria rather than Emperor Basil II, wrote that Stephen I's army occupied Ajtony's realm in parallel with Basil II's 1002 conquest of Vidin. Makkai placed the conquest of Ajtony's realm in 1008. According to Pop, Stephen I decided to invade the Banat after a 1027 Pecheneg raid on the Byzantine Empire and Emperor Constantine VIII's death the following year. Pop also writes that Ajtony's former duchy was not fully incorporated into the Kingdom of Hungary until the 13th century because frequent internal conflicts had enabled the Romanians to preserve their idea of a "Romanian country". Curta rejected the Long Life account of Ajtony altogether, calling it a "family legend" from a 14th-century hagiography.

== See also ==
- Glad
- Gyula III
- Koppány
- Banate of Severin

== Sources ==
=== Primary ===
- Anonymus, Notary of King Béla: The Deeds of the Hungarians (Edited, Translated and Annotated by Martyn Rady and László Veszprémy) (2010). In: Rady, Martyn; Veszprémy, László; Bak, János M. (2010); Anonymus and Master Roger; CEU Press; ISBN 978-963-9776-95-1.
- Constantine Porphyrogenitus: De Administrando Imperio (Greek text edited by Gyula Moravcsik, English translation b Romillyi J. H. Jenkins) (1967). Dumbarton Oaks Center for Byzantine Studies. ISBN 0-88402-021-5.
- John Skylitzes: A Synopsis of Byzantine History, 811–1057 (Translated by John Wortley with Introductions by Jean-Claude Cheynet and Bernad Flusin and Notes by Jean-Claude Cheynet) (2010). Cambridge University Press. ISBN 978-0-521-76705-7.

=== Secondary ===
- Berend, Nora; Urbańczyk, Przemysław; Wiszewski, Przemysław (2013). Central Europe in the High Middle Ages: Bohemia, Hungary and Poland, c. 900-c. 1300. Cambridge University Press. ISBN 978-0-521-78156-5.
- Bóna, István (1994). "The Hungarian–Slav Period (895–1172)". In Köpeczi, Béla; Barta, Gábor; Bóna, István; Makkai, László; Szász, Zoltán; Borus, Judit (eds.). History of Transylvania. Akadémiai Kiadó. pp. 109–177. ISBN 963-05-6703-2.
- Curta, Florin (2001). "Transylvania around A.D. 1000". In Urbańczyk, Przemysław (ed.). Europe around the year 1000. Wydawn. DiG. pp. 141–165. ISBN 978-83-7181-211-8.
- Curta, Florin (2006). Southeastern Europe in the Middle Ages, 500–1250. Cambridge University Press. ISBN 978-0-521-89452-4.
- Deletant, Dennis (1992). "Ethnos and Mythos in the History of Transylvania: the case of the chronicler Anonymus". In Péter, László (ed.). Historians and the History of Transylvania. Boulder. pp. 67–85. ISBN 0-88033-229-8.
- Engel, Pál (2001). The Realm of St Stephen: A History of Medieval Hungary, 895–1526. I.B. Tauris Publishers. ISBN 1-86064-061-3.
- Georgescu, Vlad (1991). The Romanians: A History. Ohio State University Press. ISBN 0-8142-0511-9.
- Györffy, György (1987a). Az Árpád-kori Magyarország történeti földrajza, I: Abaújvár, Arad, Árva, Bács, Baranya, Bars, Békés, Bereg, Beszterce, Bihar, Bodrog, Borsod, Brassó, Csanád és Csongrád megye [Historical Geography of Hungary of the Árpáds, Volume I: The Counties of Abaújvár, Arad, Árva, Bács, Baranya, Bars, Békés, Bereg, Beszterce, Bihar, Bodrog, Borsod, Brassó, Csanád and Csongrád] (in Hungarian). Akadémiai Kiadó. ISBN 963-05-4200-5.
- Györffy, György (1987b). Az Árpád-kori Magyarország történeti földrajza, III: Heves, Hont, Hunyad, Keve, Kolozs, Komárom, Krassó, Kraszna, Küküllő megye és Kunság [Historical Geography of Hungary of the Árpáds, Volume III: The Counties of Heves, Hont, Hunyad, Keve, Kolozs, Komárom, Krassó, Kraszna and Küküllő, and Cumania] (in Hungarian). Akadémiai Kiadó. ISBN 963-05-3613-7.
- Györffy, György (1988). Anonymus: Rejtély vagy történeti forrás [Anonymous: An Enigma or a Source for History] (in Hungarian). Akadémiai Kiadó. ISBN 963-05-4868-2.
- Györffy, György (2000). István király és műve [King Stephen and His Work] (in Hungarian). Balassi Kiadó. ISBN 978-963-506-382-6.
- Hosszú, Gábor (2012). Heritage of Scribes: The Relation of Rovas Scripts to Eurasian Writing Systems. Rovas Foundation. ISBN 978-963-88437-4-6.
- Macartney, C. A. (1953). The Medieval Hungarian Historians: A Critical & Analytical Guide. Cambridge University Press. ISBN 978-0-521-08051-4.
- Madgearu, Alexandru (2005). The Romanians in the Anonymous Gesta Hungarorum: Truth and Fiction. Romanian Cultural Institute, Center for Transylvanian Studies. ISBN 973-7784-01-4.
- Pop, Ioan Aurel (1996). Romanians and Hungarians from the 9th to the 14th Century: The Genesis of the Transylvanian Medieval State. Centrul de Studii Transilvane, Fundaţia Culturală Română. ISBN 973-577-037-7.
- Sălăgean, Tudor (2005). "Romanian Society in the Early Middle Ages (9th–14th Centuries AD)". In Pop, Ioan-Aurel; Bolovan, Ioan (eds.). History of Romania: Compendium. Romanian Cultural Institute (Center for Transylvanian Studies). pp. 133–207. ISBN 978-973-7784-12-4.
- Stephenson, Paul (2000). Byzantium's Balkan Frontier: A Political Study of the Northern Balkans, 900–1204. Cambridge University Press. ISBN 978-0-521-02756-4.
- Szegfű, László (1994). "Ajtony; Csanád". In Kristó, Gyula; Engel, Pál; Makk, Ferenc (eds.). Korai magyar történeti lexikon (9–14. század) [Encyclopedia of the Early Hungarian History (9th–14th centuries)] (in Hungarian). Akadémiai Kiadó. pp. 32–33, 145. ISBN 963-05-6722-9.
- Tóth, Sándor László (1999). "The territories of the Hungarian tribal federation around 950 (Some observations on Constantine VII's "Tourkia")". In Prinzing, Günter; Salamon, Maciej (eds.). Byzanz und Ostmitteleuropa 950–1453: Beiträge zu einer table-ronde des XIX. International Congress of Byzantine Studies, Copenhagen 1996 [Byzantium and East Central Europe 950–1453: Contributions to a Round-table Discussion of the 19th International Congress of Byzantine Studies, Copenhagen 1996]. Harrassowitz Verlag. pp. 22–34. ISBN 3-447-04146-3.
