= Lawrence (bishop of Csanád) =

Hungarian clergyman (died after 1113)

- Bishop of Csanád
- Installed: 1083 or earlier
- Term ended: 1113 or later
- Predecessor: unknown
- Successor: Bestertius (?)

Personal details
- Denomination: Roman Catholic

Lawrence (Hungarian: Lőrinc; died after 1113) was a prelate in the Kingdom of Hungary at the turn of the 11th and 12th centuries, who served as Bishop of Csanád from around 1083 to 1113.

== Career ==
According to the Long Life of Saint Gerard, Lawrence was the fifth bishop of the Diocese of Csanád, i.e. he held the dignity after Gerard (1030–1046), Maurus (1046–1053) and two unidentified bishops. Under his episcopal reign, Gerard was canonized in 1083, at the initiative of King Ladislaus I of Hungary. Gerard's holy relics were placed in the cathedral of Csanád (today Cenad, Romania) on 24 February 1084. The Cumans invaded and plundered the eastern part of the kingdom, including the territory of the Diocese of Csanád, in 1091. Lawrence attended the Synod of Szabolcs in 1092, presided over by Ladislaus I, which passed decrees which regulated the life of both clergymen and laymen, several aspects of liturgy and Church administration. Lawrence's name is mentioned among the testimonies by two royal charters of Coloman, King of Hungary issued regarding the Zobor Abbey in 1111 and 1113. He was succeeded by Bestertius prior to 1138.

The 14th-century Illuminated Chronicle mentions that two bishops – Koppány and a certain Lawrence – participated in Coloman's military campaign against the western principalities of the Kievan Rus' in 1099. The Hungarians suffered a serious defeat, when the hired Cumans attacked their camp at Peremyshl (present-day Przemyśl, Poland). Both Koppány and Lawrence were killed during the skirmish. The late 12th-century Annales Posonienses also mentions that Koppány was killed by the Cumans in 1100 (correctly, 1099), but Lawrence's death in the same year is not connected to the campaign. If this Lawrence is identical with the bishop of Csanád (no other Lawrence is mentioned in the era, except for the archbishop of the same name), it is possible that the bishop in the late 11th century and in the 1110s are two persons, and Lawrence (I) was succeeded by Lawrence (II) after the former perished in Rus' in 1099.

== Sources ==
=== Primary sources ===
- Bak, János M.; Veszprémy, László; Kersken, Norbert (2018). Chronica de gestis Hungarorum e codice picto saec. XIV [The Illuminated Chronicle: Chronicle of the deeds of the Hungarians from the fourteenth-century illuminated codex]. Budapest: Central European University Press. ISBN 978-9-6338-6264-3.

=== Secondary studies ===
- Juhász, Kálmán (1930). A csanádi püspökség története alapításától a tatárjárásig (1030–1242) [The History of the Diocese of Csanád from its Foundation to the Mongol Invasion (1030–1242)] (in Hungarian). Csanádvármegyei Könyvtár 19–20.
- Makk, Ferenc; Thoroczkay, Gábor (2006). Írott források az 1050–1116 közötti magyar történelemről [Written Sources of the Hungarian History between 1050 and 1116] (in Hungarian). Szegedi Középkorász Műhely. ISBN 978-963-482-794-8.
- Zsoldos, Attila (2011). Magyarország világi archontológiája, 1000–1301 [Secular Archontology of Hungary, 1000–1301] (in Hungarian). História, MTA Történettudományi Intézete. ISBN 978-963-9627-38-3.

Catholic Church titles
Preceded by unknown	Bishop of Csanád; 1083–1113	Succeeded by Bestertius (?)
