= Glad (duke) =

Legendary ruler of Banat around 900 AD

Glad (Bulgarian: Глад, Hungarian: Galád, Romanian: Glad, Serbian: Глад) was the ruler of Banat (in present-day Romania and Serbia) at the time of the Hungarian conquest of the Carpathian Basin around 900 AD, according to the Gesta Hungarorum. The Gesta, which was written by an author known in modern scholarship as Anonymus in the second half of the 12th century or in the early 13th century, is the earliest extant Hungarian chronicle. The Gesta did not refer to the enemies of the conquering Hungarians (or Magyars), who had been mentioned in earlier annals and chronicles, but wrote of a dozen persons, including Glad, who are unknown from other primary sources of the Hungarian Conquest. Therefore, modern historians debate whether Glad was an actual enemy of the conquerors or only a "fictitious person" made up by Anonymus. In Romanian historiography, based on the mention by Anonymus some 300 years later, Glad is described as one of the three Romanian dukes who ruled a historical region of present-day Romania in the early 10th century.

According to the Gesta, Glad came from Vidin in Bulgaria. He occupied Banat with the assistance of "Cumans" before the arrival of the Magyars. Anonymus wrote that Cumans, Bulgarians, and Vlachs (or Romanians), supported Glad against the invading Magyars, but the latter annihilated their united army in a battle near the Timiș River. The Gesta presents Ahtum, who ruled Banat in the early 11th century, according to the longer version of the Life of St Gerard, as Glad's descendant.

== Background ==
The earliest record of the Magyars (or Hungarians) is connected to their alliance with the Bulgars against a group of Byzantine prisoners who were planning to cross the Lower Danube in an attempt to return to their homeland around 837 AD. They dwelled in the steppes north and northwest of the Black Sea. A group of rebellious subjects of the Khazar Khaganate, known as Kabars, joined them, according to the Byzantine Emperor Constantine Porphyrogenitus. The Annals of St. Bertin states that the Magyars launched their first military expedition against the Carolingian Empire in 861.

The Magyars invaded Bulgaria in alliance with the Byzantine Empire in 894. In retaliation, the Bulgars entered into an alliance with the Pechenegs. They jointly invaded the Magyars' lands, forcing them to leave the Pontic steppes and cross the Carpathian Mountains in search of a new homeland. In the Carpathian Basin, the Magyars "roamed in the wildernesses of the Pannonians and Avars" before attacking "the lands of the Carinthians, Moravians and Bulgars", according to the contemporaneous Regino of Prüm.

The Hungarian conquest of the Carpathian Basin is the principal subject of the Gesta Hungarorum, which is the earliest extant Hungarian chronicle. Most scholars agree that a notary of Béla III of Hungary, who ruled between 1173 and 1196, wrote the Gesta after the king's death. According to an alternative theory, the author of the Gesta, who is now known as Anonymus, had served Béla II of Hungary before starting to complete his work around 1150. Anonymus did not write of Svatopluk I of Moravia, Braslav, Duke of Lower Pannonia and the invading Magyars' other opponents who had been mentioned in works written in earlier centuries. Neither did he refer to the Magyars' fights with the Moravians, Franks and Bavarians which had been described in earlier annals and chronicles. On the other hand, Anonymus wrote of local polities and rulers—including Gelou, the Vlach duke of Transylvania, Menumorut, the lord of the regions between the rivers Mureș, Someș and Tisza, and Salanus, the Bulgar ruler of the lands between the Danube and the Tisza—unknown from other primary sources.

== Banat on the eve of the Hungarian Conquest ==
Stirrups, horse bits and spear points from inhumation graves unearthed at Sânpetru German suggest that the Avars settled along the Mureș River in Banat soon after their conquest of the Carpathian Basin in the late 560s. However, most archaeological finds in the lands south of the Mureș that had been attributed to the Avars are dated to the "Late Avar" period. Written sources show the survival of Gepids under Avar rule in the wider region of the Timiș River. For instance, the Byzantine historian Theophylact Simocatta wrote of "three Gepid settlements" which were destroyed by an invading Byzantine army in 599 or 600. A rich burial yielding weapons unearthed at Pančevo and the Treasure of Sânnicolau Mare show that an important center of power existed in Banat in the "Late Avar" period, according to archaeologist Florin Curta. However, "Late Avar" cemeteries did not survive the 8th century.

The Franks launched a series of expeditions against the Avar Khaganate in 790s, causing its disintegration. Krum of Bulgaria, who reigned between around 802 and 814, soon tried to take advantage of the fall of the Avars and invaded former Avar territories, but no contemporaneous report mentioned his conquest in the Carpathian Basin. The Abodrites who lived in "Dacia on the Danube as neighbors of the Bulgars" sent envoys to Emperor Louis the Pious in 824, complaining "about vicious aggression by the Bulgars" and seeking the emperor's assistance against them, according to the Royal Frankish Annals. The Abodrites inhabited the lands along either the Timiș or the Tisza. According to a memorial inscription from Provadia, a Bulgar military commander, Onegavonais, drowned in the Tisza, implying Omurtag of Bulgaria's attempts to expand his rule in the region in the 820s. The Bulgars invaded Moravia in 863 and 883, suggesting that they controlled at least the crossing-points across the rivers Mureș and Tisza, according to the historian István Bóna.

Bóna writes that the Bavarian Geographer is the last source which contains contemporaneous information of the eastern regions of the Carpathian Basin in the 9th century. According to this source, which is actually a list of the tribes inhabiting the lands east of the Carolingian Empire around 840, the Merehani, who had 30 civitates, or fortified centers, lived along the southernmost parts of the empire's eastern frontiers. Their land also bordered on Bulgaria. According to an alternative theory of the location of Moravia, which is primarily based on the Bavarian Geographer and Emperor Constantine Porphyrogenitus's report of "great Moravia, the unbaptized", Banat was the center of this early medieval polity, which was annihilated by the conquering Magyars. Archaeologist Silviu Oța identifies the Merehani with the Abodrites, adding that they were obviously a Slavic tribe. The name of the Karaš and other rivers implies that a population speaking a Turkic language—Avar, Bulgar, or Pecheneg—also inhabited the Banat in the Early Middle Ages, but those rivers may have received their names only in the 11th and 12th centuries.

Historian Vlad Georgescu writes that archaeological research has proven the existence of about 60 settlements in Glad's duchy. Other historians, including Sălăgean and Pop, say that the earth-and-wooden or stone fortresses unearthed at Bulci, Cenad, Ilidia, Orșova, Pescari, and Vladimirescu were Glad's forts. Florin Curta says that the dating of these sites is uncertain.

== Anonymus's narration ==
=== Glad and his duchy ===
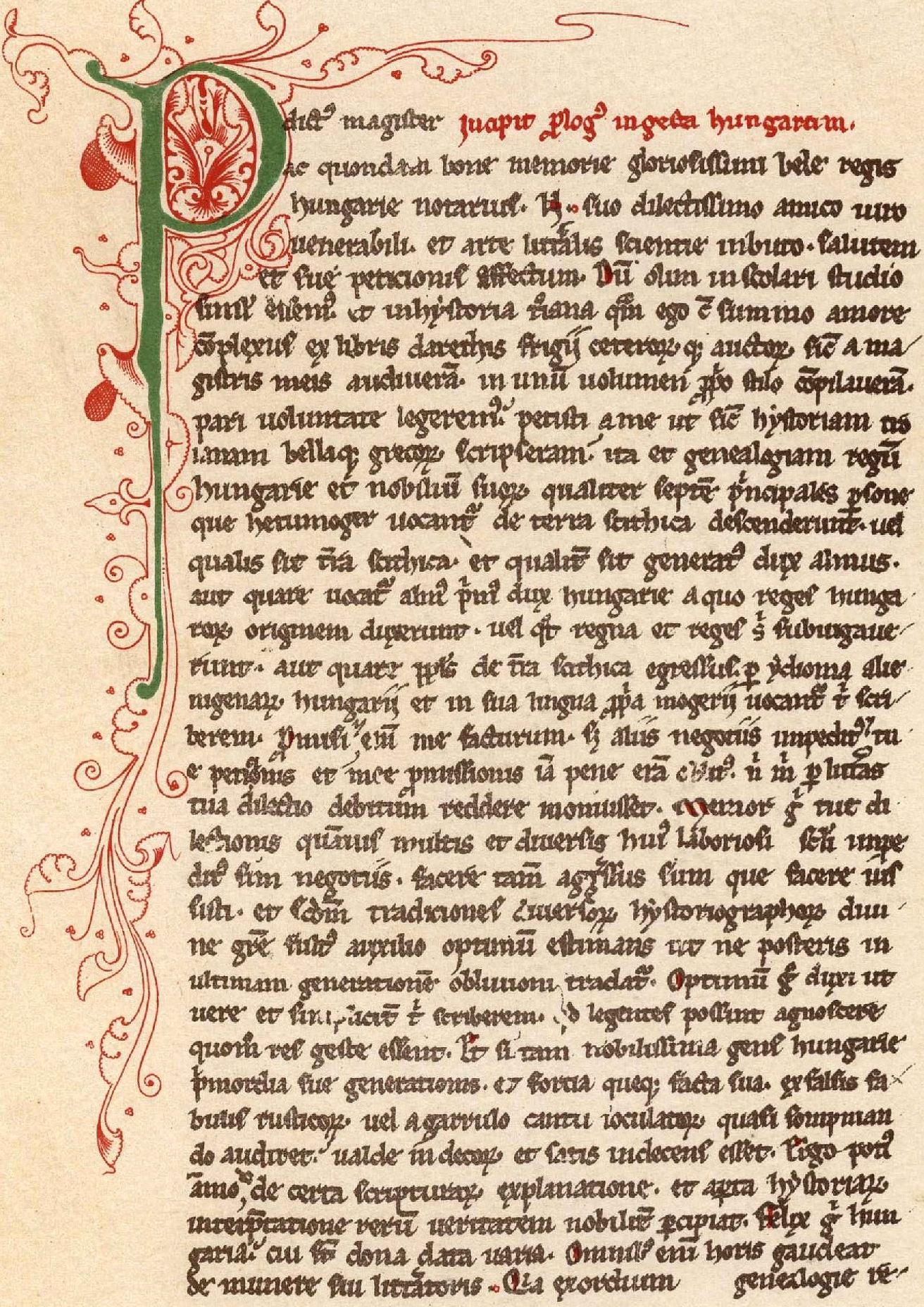
The first page of the sole manuscript preserving the text of the Gesta Hungarorum, the only chronicle which mentions Glad

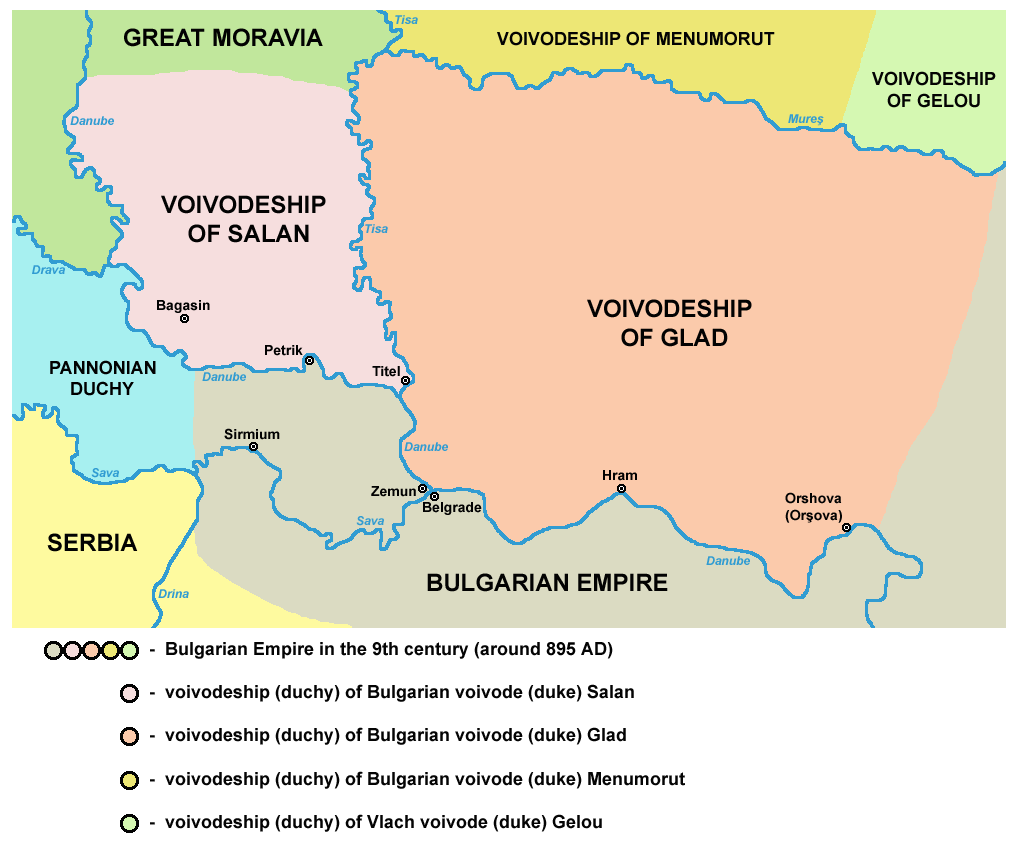
Glad's duchy: the map presents the duchies of Glad, Gelou and Menumorut in accordance with Anonymus's report, but Salan's duchy in the map is lesser than it is described in the Gesta Hungarorum; the map also depicts "Great Moravia" and Braslav's duchy in Lower Pannonia which are not mentioned by Anonymus

According to the Gesta Hungarorum, Rus' princes gave a short description of the Carpathian Basin to the Magyar commanders before they decided to invade the territory. The princes told them that "Slavs, Bulgarians, Vlachs, and the shepherds of the Romans" inhabited the territory. In short, Anonymus continued, one of the princes, the Prince of Halych, also informed the Magyar leaders of the polities among which the territory was divided and their rulers. Among these local rulers, the Rus' prince listed Glad who had "taken possession of the land from the river Mureș up to the castle" of Ursua (Orşova or Vršac) with the help of the Cumans. In another chapter of the Gesta, Anonymus wrote that Glad "held power from the Mureș River to the castle of Palanka", showing that he identified Glad's duchy with the territory that is now known as Banat. Anonymus explicitly referred to Glad as "the prince of that country" in the same chapter.

The Gesta did not write of the peoples inhabiting Glad's duchy. On the other hand, it stated that Glad commanded "a great army of horsemen and foot soldiers" and his army was "supported by Cumans, Bulgarians and Vlachs". According to Tudor Sălăgean and other Romanian historians, the list of the peoples reflects the one-time ethnic composition of the Banat, showing that a Turkic people (Pechenegs, Avars or Kabars), Bulgarians and Vlachs, or Romanians, inhabited the region in the late 9th century. Historian Victor Spinei writes that Anonymus's reference to the "Cumans" supporting Glad's army shows that Glad sought the Pechenegs' assistance against the invading Magyars.

Anonymus wrote that Glad had come "from the castle of Vidin" and occupied his duchy "with the help of the Cumans". This report, together with Anonymus's reference to the Bulgarians' assistance against the Magyars, suggests that Glad was subjected to Simeon I of Bulgaria, according to Sălăgean. This theory is not accepted by historian Ioan-Aurel Pop, who writes that it is only an "attractive" scholarly hypothesis which has not been proven. Madgearu says that the Banat, which had been an integral part of Bulgaria since the late 820s, became an independent state under Glad's rule after the death of Simeon I in 927. Pop also says Anonymus's reference to Glad's arrival from Vidin suggest that Glad was either Bulgarian or Romanian, because the region of that town was densely populated by Romanians. The name of Glad is most probably of South Slavic origin, according to Pop and Neagu Djuvara. In connection with Glad, Anonymus also emphasized that "from his line was born" a chieftain, named Ahtum, whom Stephen I of Hungary defeated in the first half of the 11th century, according to the Long Life of Saint Gerard.

=== The conquest of Banat ===
According to the Gesta Hungarorum, the Magyars conquered the lands between the Danube and the Tisza, Transylvania, the western regions of present-day Slovakia and Transdanubia before their supreme head, Árpád, and his chieftains decided to send an army to invade Glad's duchy. They dispatched three commanders—named "Zovárd, Kadocsa, and Vajta"—with the task. The three commanders crossed the Tisza at Kanjiža and halted at the Csesztreg River before advancing as far as the Bega River. In the next two weeks, they forced the inhabitants of the region between the Mureș and Someș to yield and to give their sons as hostages. Thereafter, Anonymus continued, the Magyar army marched towards the Timiș and "encamped beside the ford of Foeni" where they wanted to cross the river. However, Glad and his large army awaited them on the other bank. A day later, Zovárd "enjoined his brother, Kadocsa, to go lower down with half his army and try to cross in any way in order to attack the enemy", and Kadocsa obeyed this command. Both divisions crossed the river and stormed the enemy camp. In the battle, "two dukes of the Cumans and three kneses of the Bulgarians were slain" before Glad decided to retreat, but his army was annihilated.

Anonymus writes that Glad took shelter in "the castle of Kovin", while the Magyars marched to "the borders of the Bulgarians" and encamped at the Ponjavica River. Zovárd, Kadocsa and Vajta laid siege to Kovin, forcing Glad to surrender it three days later. In short, they also seized Orșova where they lived "for a whole month", according to the Gesta. Vajta returned to Árpád, taking with him the hostages and the booty, while Zovárd and Kadocsa sent an envoy to Árpád to ask permission to invade the Byzantine Empire. Ioan-Aurel Pop writes that Glad must have survived his defeat and recovered at least parts of his duchy in exchange for paying a tribute to the Magyars, because his descendant, Ahtum, ruled the territory some decades later, according to Anonymus. In the words of László Gulyás, "after Glad submitted to them, he was left as their vassal in his territory".

== Glad in modern historiography ==
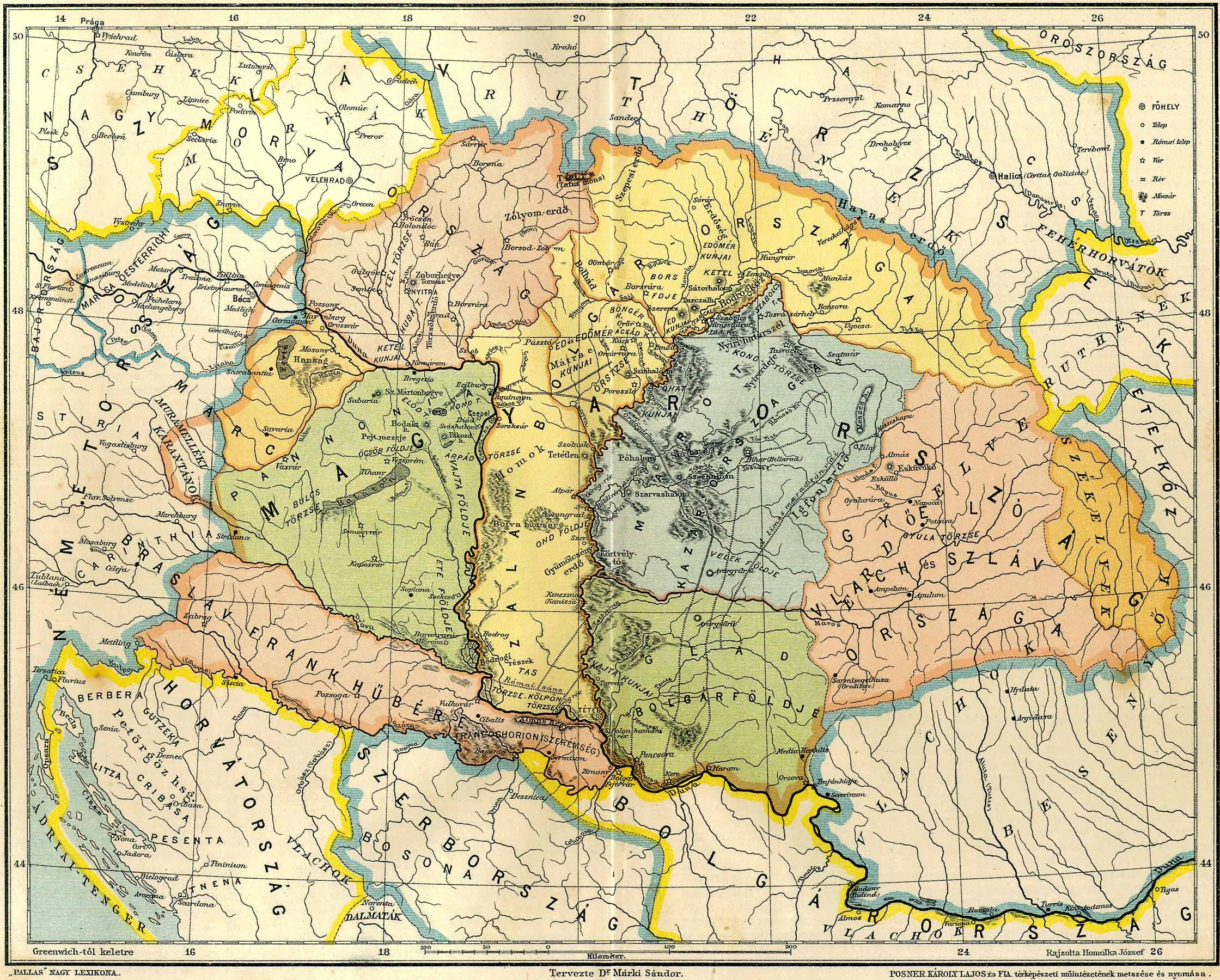
The Carpathian Basin on the eve of the "Hungarian Conquest": a map based primarily on the narration of the Gesta Hungarorum from the late 19th-century Pallas Nagy Lexikona ("Great Encyclopedia of Pallas")

Glad is one of the local rulers who are mentioned only in the Gesta Hungarorum. Historians have continuously debated the reliability of Anonymus's work which was first published in 1746. Anonymus's reference to the Cumans, Bulgarians and Vlachs supporting Glad is one of the key points in the scholarly debate, because the Cumans did not arrive in Europe before the 1050s. Vlad Georgescu, Victor Spinei, Ioan-Aurel Pop and many other Romanian historians identify the "Cumans", or Cumani, as Pechenegs, Avars or Kabars, saying that the Hungarian word that Anonymus translated as "Cuman" (kun) originally dubbed any Turkic tribe. According to other historians, including Dennis Deletant, György Györffy and Carlile Aylmer Macartney, Anonymus's reference to the three peoples is an anachronism, which reflects the ethnic composition of the late 13th-century Bulgaria.

In Romanian historiography, Glad is presented as one of the three local "voivodes" who ruled territories inhabited by Romanians at the time of the Hungarian Conquest. Madgearu and Pop list almost a dozen place-names from the Banat and its wider region which suggest that settlements were named after Glad. For instance, a village named Cladova (formerly Galadua) and a monastery named Galad were first mentioned in 1308 and 1333, respectively, and an Ottoman document from 1579 referred to two villages named Gladeš and a settlement named Kladova. Silviu Oța writes that the theory of a connection between Glad and the name of those settlements is "considerably weak", because neither the origins nor the chronology of those place names have so far been thoroughly studied. Oţa also says, "the historical geography of the Banat is reflected quite accurately in the chronicle", which suggests that Anonymus knew the geographical features of the region, but does not prove that Glad was a real person. According to Györffy and Kordé, Anonymus who invented all local rulers in the Gesta named Glad after the village where the monastery was built. Gyula Kristó states that the name was created by the chronicler from the toponym Ghilad. Deletant, Macartney and other scholars also say that Anonymus seems to have borrowed many episodes of his narrative of Glad (including his connection with Vidin) from the story of his alleged descendant, Ahtum, in the Long Life of Saint Gerard.

== See also ==
- Bulgarian–Hungarian Wars
- Laborec (ruler)
- Rulers of Vojvodina
- Ghilad
- Banate of Severin
- Ahtum

== Sources ==
=== Primary sources ===
- Anonymus, Notary of King Béla: The Deeds of the Hungarians (Edited, Translated and Annotated by Martyn Rady and László Veszprémy) (2010). In: Rady, Martyn; Veszprémy, László; Bak, János M. (2010); Anonymus and Master Roger; CEU Press; ISBN 978-963-9776-95-1.
- Constantine Porphyrogenitus: De Administrando Imperio (Greek text edited by Gyula Moravcsik, English translation b Romillyi J. H. Jenkins) (1967). Dumbarton Oaks Center for Byzantine Studies. ISBN 0-88402-021-5.
- Royal Frankish Annals (1972). In: Carolingian Chronicles: Royal Frankish Annals and Nithard's Histories (Translated by Bernhard Walter Scholz with Barbara Rogers); The University of Michigan Press; ISBN 0-472-06186-0.
- The Chronicle of Regino of Prüm (2009). In: History and Politics in Late Carolingian and Ottonian Europe: The Chronicle of Regino of Prüm and Adalbert of Magdeburg (Translated and annotated by Simon MacLean); Manchester University Press; ISBN 978-0-7190-7135-5.
- The History of Theophylact Simocatta (An English Translation with Introduction and Notes: Michael and Mary Whitby) (1986). Clarendon Press. ISBN 0-19-822799-X.

=== Secondary sources ===
- Barford, P. M. (2001). The Early Slavs: Culture and Society in Early Medieval Eastern Europe. Cornell University Press. ISBN 0-8014-3977-9.
- Boba, Imre (1971). Moravia's History Reconsidered: A Reinterpretation of Medieval Sources. Martinus Nijhoff. ISBN 978-90-247-5041-2.
- Boia, Lucian (2001). History and Myth in Romanian Consciousness (Translated by James Christian Brown). CEU Press. ISBN 963-9116-96-3.
- Bowlus, Charles R. (1994). Franks, Moravians and Magyars: The Struggle for the Middle Danube, 788–907. University of Pennsylvania Press. ISBN 0-8122-3276-3.
- Curta, Florin (2001). "Transylvania around A.D. 1000". In Urbańczyk, Przemysław (ed.). Europe around the year 1000. Wydawn. DiG. pp. 141–165. ISBN 978-83-7181-211-8.
- Curta, Florin (2006). Southeastern Europe in the Middle Ages, 500–1250. Cambridge University Press. ISBN 978-0-521-89452-4.
- Deletant, Dennis (1992). "Ethnos and Mythos in the History of Transylvania: the case of the chronicler Anonymus". In Péter, László (ed.). Historians and the History of Transylvania. Boulder. pp. 67–85. ISBN 0-88033-229-8.
- Djuvara, Neagu (2012). A Concise History of Romanians. Cross Meridian. ISBN 978-1-4781-3204-2.
- Georgescu, Vlad (1991). The Romanians: A History. Ohio State University Press. ISBN 0-8142-0511-9.
- Györffy, György (1988). Anonymus: Rejtély vagy történeti forrás [Anonymous: An Enigma or a Source for History] (in Hungarian). Akadémiai Kiadó. ISBN 963-05-4868-2.
- Kordé, Zoltán (1994). "Galád". In Kristó, Gyula; Engel, Pál; Makk, Ferenc (eds.). Korai magyar történeti lexikon (9–14. század) [Encyclopedia of the Early Hungarian History (9th–14th centuries)] (in Hungarian). Akadémiai Kiadó. p. 229. ISBN 963-05-6722-9.
- Macartney, C. A. (1953). The Medieval Hungarian Historians: A Critical & Analytical Guide. Cambridge University Press. ISBN 978-0-521-08051-4.
- Madgearu, Alexandru (2005). The Romanians in the Anonymous Gesta Hungarorum: Truth and Fiction. Romanian Cultural Institute, Center for Transylvanian Studies. ISBN 973-7784-01-4.
- Opreanu, Coriolan Horaţiu (2005). "The North-Danube Regions from the Roman Province of Dacia to the Emergence of the Romanian Language (2nd–8th Centuries AD)". In Pop, Ioan-Aurel; Bolovan, Ioan (eds.). History of Romania: Compendium. Romanian Cultural Institute (Center for Transylvanian Studies). pp. 59–132. ISBN 978-973-7784-12-4.
- Oța, Silviu (2014). The Mortuary Archaeology of Medieval Banat. Brill. ISBN 978-90-04-21438-5.
- Pop, Ioan Aurel (1996). Romanians and Hungarians from the 9th to the 14th Century: The Genesis of the Transylvanian Medieval State. Centrul de Studii Transilvane, Fundaţia Culturală Română. ISBN 973-577-037-7.
- Sălăgean, Tudor (2005). "Romanian Society in the Early Middle Ages (9th–14th Centuries AD)". In Pop, Ioan-Aurel; Bolovan, Ioan (eds.). History of Romania: Compendium. Romanian Cultural Institute (Center for Transylvanian Studies). pp. 133–207. ISBN 978-973-7784-12-4.
- Spinei, Victor (2009). The Romanians and the Turkic Nomads North of the Danube Delta from the Tenth to the Mid-Thirteenth century. Koninklijke Brill NV. ISBN 978-90-04-17536-5.
- Vásáry, István (2005). Cumans and Tatars: Oriental Military in the Pre-Ottoman Balkans, 1185–1365. Cambridge University Press. ISBN 0-521-83756-1.
