= Maurus (bishop of Csanád) =

Hungarian Benedictine monk and bishop (died after 1053)

Maurus O.S.B.
- Bishop of Csanád
- Installed: 1046
- Term ended: 1053 or later
- Predecessor: Gerard
- Successor: unknown

Personal details
- Denomination: Roman Catholic

Maurus (Hungarian: Mór; died after 1053) was a Hungarian Benedictine monk in the 11th century, who served as the second Bishop of Csanád from 1046 until at least 1053.

== Early life ==
Segments of Maurus' life are preserved by the Long Life of Saint Gerard, the hagiography of Saint Gerard Sagredo, the first bishop of Csanád and his predecessor. Maurus was a confidant of Gerard, who tasked with the conversion of the pagan inhabitants of his diocese after its establishment in 1030. Some historians – e.g. Samu Borovszky – argued that Maurus was of Venetian origin too, and accompanied Gerard from Venice to the Kingdom of Hungary around 1020. However, Gerard's legend says that while Stephen I of Hungary convinced the monk not to continue his pilgrimage to the Holy Land, he sent his traveling companions secretly on their way. Gerard's shorter legend states that Maurus was a Benedictine monk from the Bakonybél Abbey, where near Gerard lived as a hermit from around 1024. There, Maurus became a "faithful companion" of Gerard.

After Stephen I installed Gerard as the first bishop of Csanád in 1030, Maurus followed him to the newly established diocese. The Long Life of Saint Gerard narrates that Gerard established an ecclesiastical school in his episcopal see Csanád (today Cenad, Romania). When its teacher, cantor Walther asked the bishop for another magister to help him in his work due to the growing number of students, Gerard sent Maurus to Székesfehérvár in order to visit the schools located there. Maurus found a German named Henry, who, thereafter, became lector of the students.

== Bishop ==
Gerard's martyrdom took place in Buda in September 1046, during the Vata pagan uprising. Maurus, who survived the anti-Christian massacres, succeeded him as bishop of Csanád already in that year, when the newly crowned Andrew I of Hungary stabilized the kingdom and crushed the rebellion. Under Maurus' guidance, the Benedictine monks transferred Gerard's remains after seven years, i.e. [24 February] 1053, to the Mary Church in Csanád. This delegation, consisted of clerics and nobles, was led by Maurus and Philip, the abbot of the local monastery of the Blessed Virgin. They placed the holy relics in a stone sarcophagus. According to the longer legend, there was a brief conflict between the canons and Philip, whether Gerard should be buried in the cathedral or in the monastery church run by the latter. The legend says that two Benedictine monks succeeded Maurus as bishops, but the hagiography did not preserve their name. In 1083, when Gerard was canonized, Lawrence served as the fifth bishop of Csanád.

== Sources ==
- Juhász, Kálmán (1930). A csanádi püspökség története alapításától a tatárjárásig (1030–1242) [The History of the Diocese of Csanád from its Foundation to the Mongol Invasion (1030–1242)] (in Hungarian). Csanádvármegyei Könyvtár 19–20.
- Zsoldos, Attila (2011). Magyarország világi archontológiája, 1000–1301 [Secular Archontology of Hungary, 1000–1301] (in Hungarian). História, MTA Történettudományi Intézete. ISBN 978-963-9627-38-3.

Catholic Church titles
Preceded by Gerard	Bishop of Csanád; 1046–1053	Succeeded by unknown
