= Votive Church, Szeged =

Cathedral of Our Lady
- The Cathedral and Votive Church of Our Lady of Hungary
- Szegedi Dóm
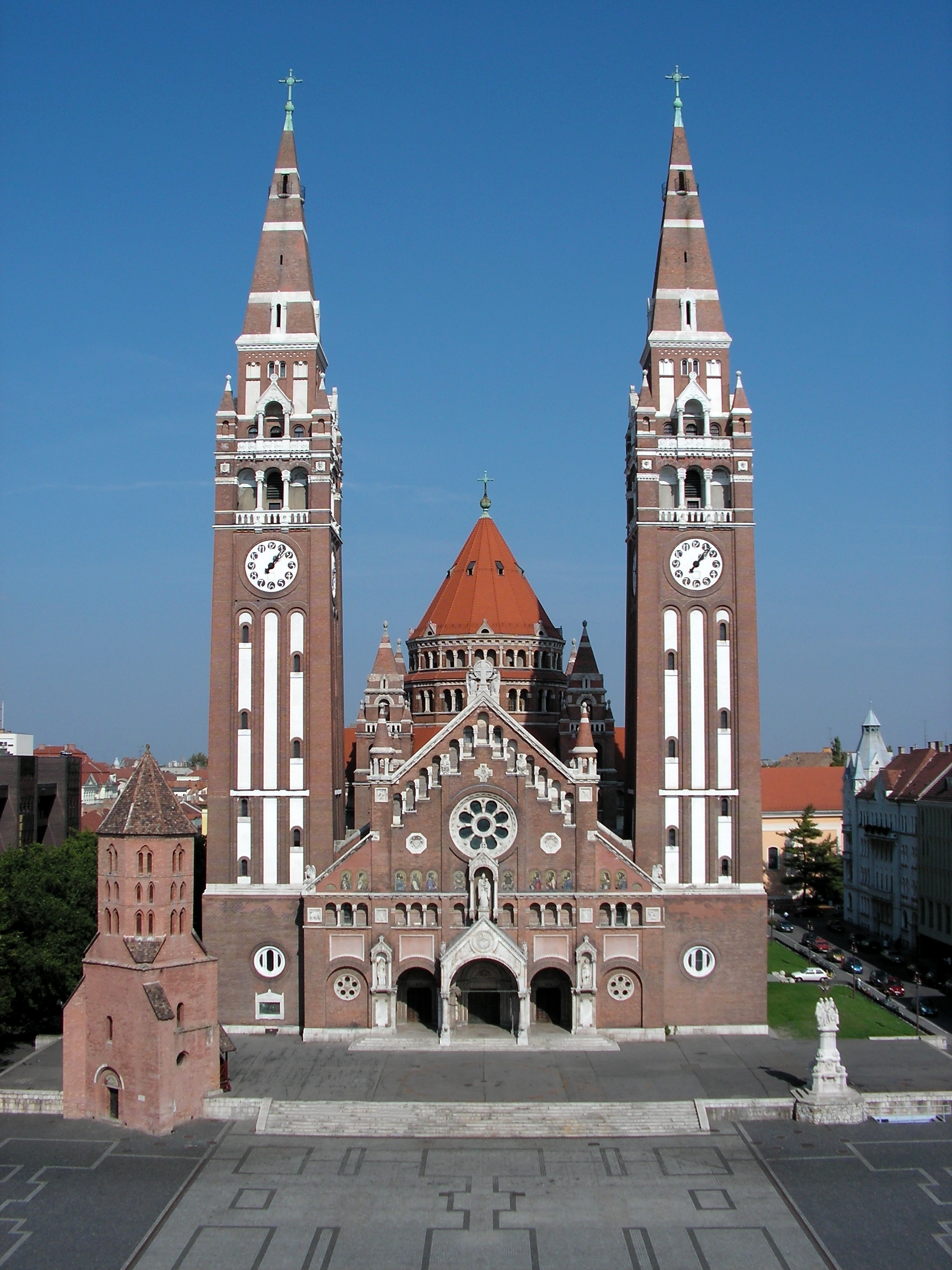
- The Cathedral
- Cathedral of Our Lady
- 46°14′56″N 20°08′57″E
- Location: Szeged
- Country: Hungary
- Denomination: Roman Catholic
- Website: Website of the Cathedral

History
- Status: Active
- Founded: 1914-06-21

Architecture
- Functional status: Cathedral and Parish Church
- Groundbreaking: 21 June 1914
- Completed: 1930

Specifications
- Width: 51 m (167 ft)

Administration
- Parish: Downtown Szeged

Clergy
- Bishop: László Kiss-Rigó

The Votive Church and Cathedral of Our Lady of Hungary (Hungarian: Szegedi dóm or Fogadalmi templom) is a twin-spired church in Szeged. It lies on Dóm square beside the Dömötör tower. Construction began in 1913, but due to the outbreak of the First World War, it was not completed until 1930. The church serves as the cathedral of the Roman Catholic Diocese of Szeged–Csanád.

== Statistics ==
It is the fourth-largest church in Hungary. The dome is 54 metres (177 ft) outside (33 m above the inside floor) and the towers are both 91 m (299 ft) high. The church contains five bells, the largest of which is the Heroes Bell which weighs 8,537 kilograms (18,821 lb), is tuned to F0 and was made in 1927. It also contains one of the largest organs in Europe with 9740 pipes and 134 ranks. The church is located in Dóm Square Szeged, which is exactly the same size as Piazza San Marco in Venice, Italy.

== History ==
Construction of the church began in 1913 after a flood had destroyed most of Szeged. It was designed by Frederick Schulek and was completed in 1930. The construction of the church was a result of a pledge made by the inhabitants of Szeged to build a cathedral after the flood of March 1879.

The Commissioner of the King was looking for a place for the church to be built, and decided on the site of the medieval St. Demeter Church. Today all that remains of the church is the Dömötör tower (now the oldest building in Szeged). Thirty-five design plans were submitted in a competition, and in the end the plans were chosen and the foundation was laid on 21 June 1914. The construction was stopped because of World War I and was finally finished on 24 October 1930. It was blessed by various bishops and archbishops. The next day the church held its first mass.

It became the Cathedral of the Diocese of Csanád when the previous St. George Cathedral (in Timișoara) became the cathedral of the new Roman Catholic Diocese of Timișoara, erected in 1930.

== Features ==
The church is made mostly of brick, and has two towers, each 91 meters high, and a large dome in between.

=== Front ===
The front of the church has a Grecian cross and rose windows underneath. Below that is the 3-metre-tall statue of Madonna, the protector of Hungary since Stephen I. On each side of the statue there are paintings of the 12 Apostles. Underneath them is the main gate and the cathedral's side gates – the one on the right is labeled "Peace"/"Venite adoremus" and the one on the left is "War"/"Vae victis".

=== Interior ===
The church has many frescos, with the main one being "Our Lady of Hungary" behind the main altar. It depicts Madonna wearing the Hungarian Crown; on her shoulder is St Stephen's coronation mantle, in her right hand is the mace, in her left is the orb, and in her arm is Jesus as a child.

Above the main altar is a fresco called "Madonna in Fur of Szöged" by Ferenc Marton which depicts Madonna in a Hungarian folk dress.

The dome's fresco was painted by László Patay who later won a Munkacsy Award in 2000. The painting is centered around the procession of the Holy Ghost but also contains depictions of St. Stephen, St. Elizabeth, St. Leslie, and St. Margaret as well.

The main transept contains the Altar of St. Anthony and the Heart of Jesus. In the cathedral's left transept is the marble Altar of St. Gerard, and statues of St. Gerard and of St. Stephen. The right transept contains the Altar of the St. Cross. Between the towers and the transepts are the side-chapels, which were built in honour of St Leslie, St. Elizabeth, St. Stephen and St Margaret.

== See also ==
- Roman Catholicism in Hungary
- List of cathedrals in Hungary
