= Giacinto Macripodari =

Greek scholar, Dominican friar, missionary and bishop (c. 1610-1672)

Yakinthos Makrypodaris
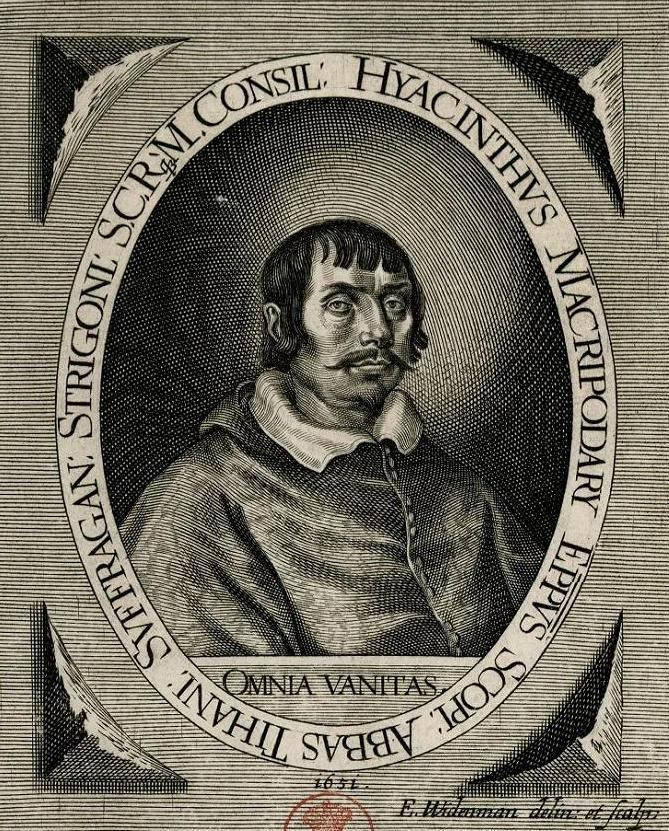
- Portrait of Giacinto Macripodari from 1651
- Other posts: Bishop of Csanad, Titular Bishop of Skopje

Orders
- Ordination: 1645
- Consecration: 1668

Personal details
- Born: Yakinthos Makrypodaris c. 1610 Chios, Greece
- Died: 30 July 1672 (aged 61–62)
- Denomination: Roman Catholic
- Occupation: Priest, friar, writer

Giacinto Macripodari (Greek: Υάκινθος Μακρυποδάρης, Yakinthos Makrypodaris, Hungarian: Jácint Ferenc Makripodári, Latin: Hyacinthus Macripodarius, Romanian: Giacinto Ischiota c. 1610 – 1672), O.P. was a 17th-century Greek scholar and Dominican friar. He was a Dominican missionary in Moldavia and was bishop of Skopje (1645–1649), custodian canon of Esztergom and Bishop of Csanád. His sermons had great success both in Greek and Italian.

== Biography ==
Giacinto Macripodari was a Greek born on the Aegean island of Chios, which was part of the Ottoman Empire at the time, in 1610. His family were Catholic and during his youth he traveled overseas to further his education. From 1632 to 1636 he studied in a theological school in Paris. After he completed his studies Macripodari traveled back to his native Chios where he became vicar and taught at the Dominican monastery.

Several years later the learned Macripodari moved to the Christian quarter of the Ottoman empire's capital, Constantinople, where he soon became vicar of the Dominican monastery. His sermons had great attainment both in the Greek and Italian languages. In 1645 Macripodari became the confessor of the German envoy to Constantinople Alexander von Greiffenklau, this association and support ultimately helped further his career.

Macripodari was consequently appointed custodian canon of Esztergom in 1645. He traveled to Vienna where Ferdinand III, Holy Roman Emperor nominated him as the titular bishop of Skopje, a post he held from 29 July 1645 to 1649. Subsequently, Macripodari sought to obtain a regular episcopal seat. He migrated to Moldavia in 1646, where he stayed in Jassy, its capital city. In 1658 he was appointed by Leopold I, Holy Roman Emperor, as Bishop of Csanád. He continued to serve until the 2 May 1668. Makripodari then moved to Nagyszombat where he was the assistant bishop of the Archbishop of Esztergom. Makripodari died in 1672.
