= Maddalena Contarini Gradenigo =

Maddalena "Madaluzza" Contarini Gradenigo (fl. 1779), was a Venetian aristocrat. She was known for the scandals surrounding her notorious love affairs, which brought her in conflict with the Venetian Inquisition and exemplified its opposition to the informal changes in women's positions in 18th-century Republic of Venice.

== Life ==
Maddalena (called Madaluzza) Contarini was born a member of the Contarini family, one of the most powerful in the Republic of Venice, as daughtor of Simeone Contarini, procurator of San Marco. She married Carlo Gradenigo, Bartolomeo (IV) Gradenigo, of the S. Simeone Piccolo branch (died 1755/1756), guvernor of Verona.

The case of Madaluzza Contarini Gradenigo was one of the more famed of its time, and belonged to the Inquisition's opposition to the new freedom of aristocratic women in 18th-century Venice. Previously, the upper-class women of Venice had by custom lived a secluded life. This changed in the early 18th century, when the daughters of the doge Domenico Contarini, by their example, ended the use of zoccoli, a type of shoe customarily used by Venetian upper-class women and restricting their movements. After this, the female members of the Venetian aristocracy begun to participate in social life escorted by the cavaliere servente, attended the theater and kept their own apartments outside of the homes, called Casino's, which soon became known as gambling halls.

This informal development met with great resistance from the church, who wished to set examples in the opposite direction, who in 1774 banned women from behaving to freely in public and, two years later, banned women from attending the theater without a mask and a veil and prosecuted Elisabetta Labia Priuli, Maria Bon Todarini and Julia Tron for having violated the ban. The case of Madaluzza Contarini Gradenigo was notable example of this conflict.

On 14 September 1755, she was officially banned from Verona. The reason was her companionship with several men, both above and below her social status, both Venetians as well as foreigners. She returned to Venice where she was first kept under house arrest, but eventually exiled to the countryside. She settled in Gorizia.

When she was widowed, she remarried on 5 january 1762 to Bartolomeo (II) (Andrea) Gradenigo (1729-1786), the Venetian ambassador to Paris in oktober 1762-1768. In 1764, she was prosecuted by the Venetian Inquisition. She had been reported to the Archbishop of Udine because she openly lived with a lieutenant Arneh in Gorizia, and for having participated in high society life with him.

On 1 February 1765, the Inquisition banned her from accompanying her spouse to his position in Paris, so as to not bring Venice into disrepute because of her personal lifestyle. When her spouse was appointed ambassador to Vienna, she was banned from accompanying him there by the Venetian authorities for the same reasons. When he was appointed ambassador to Constantinople in 1775, however, her spouse arranged for her to be brought to him there in secret before she could be banned from it. Her presence in the Ottoman Empire was deemed destructive to the reputation of the Republic of Venice because of her infamous reputation, particularly in an Islamic country, and on 31 July 1775, the Venetian Inquisition sent a demand to her spouse to send her back. He refused, however, and she stayed with him for four years. Not until 13 July 1779, she finally returned to Venice. She was arrested upon her arrival and placed in house arrest in her country villa in Este.

== See also ==
- Caterina Sagredo Barbarigo
