= Caterina Sagredo Barbarigo =

Venetian aristocrat (1715–1722)

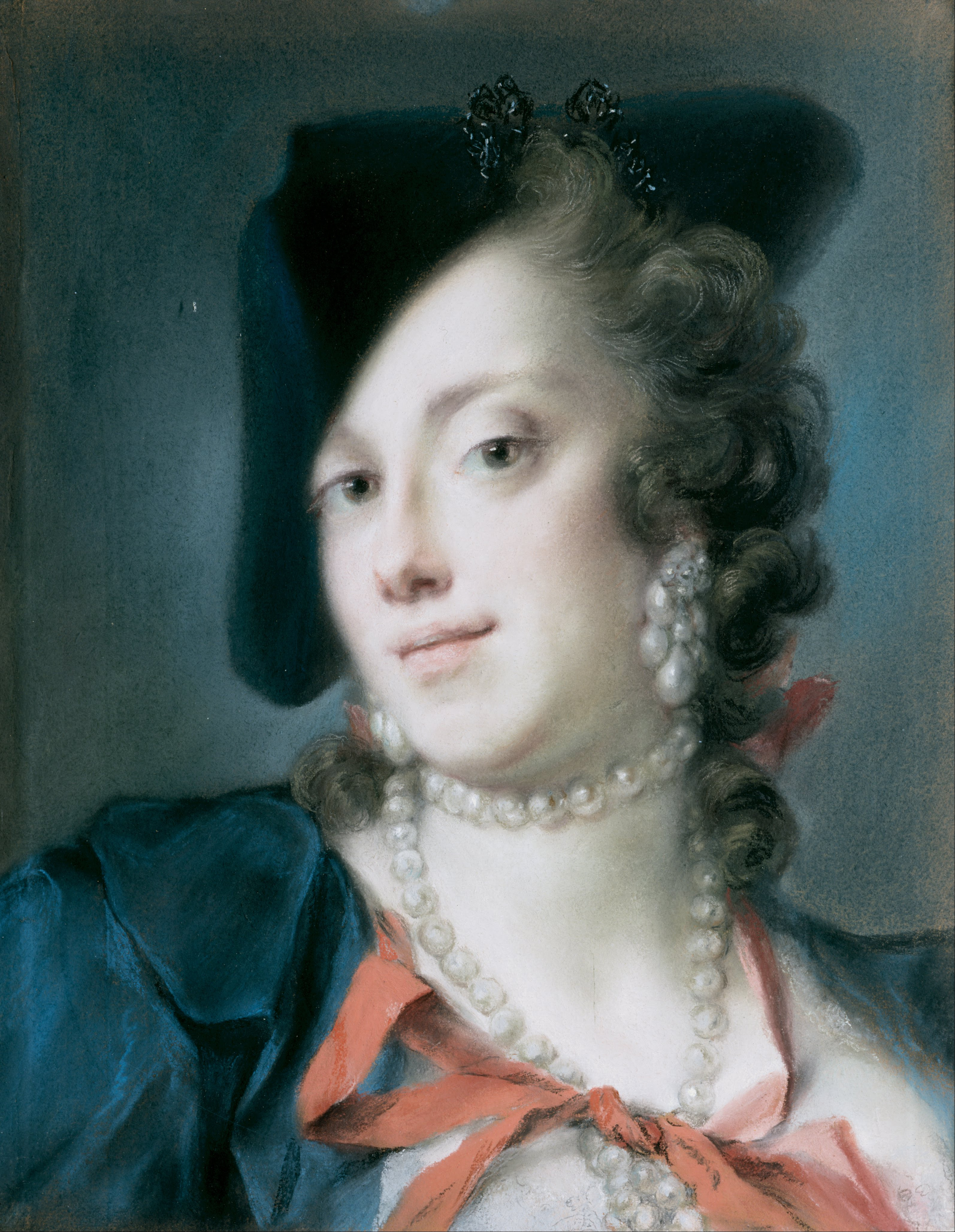
Caterina Sagredo Barbarigo by Rosalba Carriera

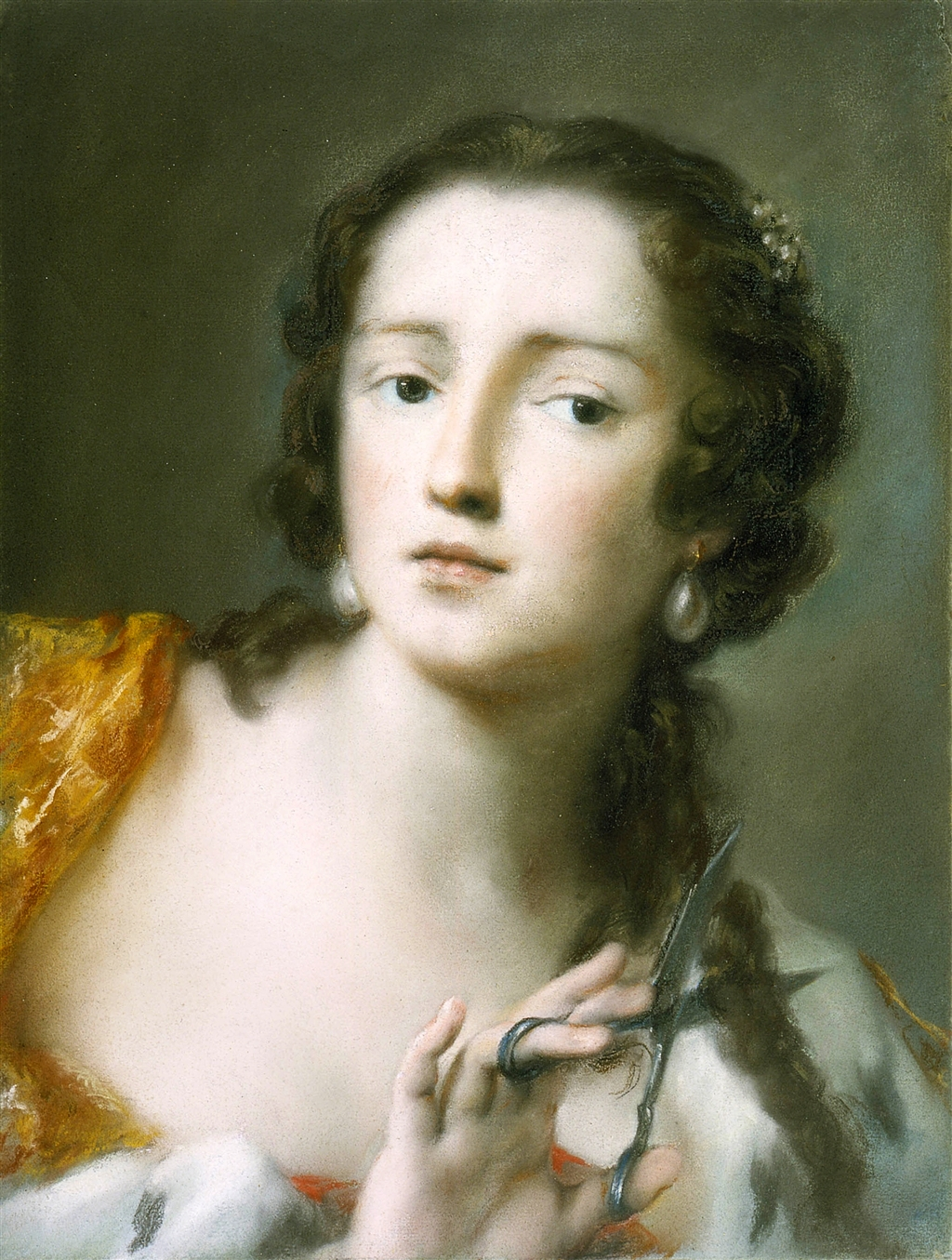
Caterina Sagredo Barbarigo as Berenice cutting her hair, by Rosalba Carriera

Caterina Sagredo Barbarigo (14 July 1715 – 11 February 1772) was a Venetian aristocrat, a casino holder and somewhat notorious salonniére.

== Biography ==
She was the daughter of Gerardo Sagredo of the aristocratic Sagredo family. She married twice: Antonio Pisaro in 1732, and Gregorio Barbarigo of the aristocratic Barbarigo family in 1739. Her only daughter was Contarina Barbarigo.

Caterina Sagredo Barbarigo was famous for her beauty and intellectual pursuits, was described as a skillful rider and became known for her travels. She hosted a literary salon counted among the most notable in contemporary Venice, and supported the inoculator Domeniceti.

=== The Casino case ===
Caterina Sagredo Barbarigo is also known for her conflict with the Venetian Inquisition. She operated a popular casino at the Giudecca. Venice become famous for its casinos at this point. The clergy and the Inquisition found these businesses scandalous, because at the casinos, both men and women from the nobility could mix freely. In prior centuries, women of the Venetian nobility had seldom been allowed to congregate with men, but during the 18th century, this underwent a sharp contrast, a development which started when Chiara, Maddalena and Laura Contarini, daughters of doge Domenico II Contarini, had stopped using the zoccoli, a certain type of shoe used by the Venetian upper-class women, which had prevented them from moving freely. The Inquisition saw the gender mixing at the newly established casinos as a symbol of this, and also banned noblewomen from frequenting them. Caterina was indicted and her casino was closed by order of the Inquisition 6 April 1747. Her case became famous, but it did not stop the development: already in 1751, another female noble, Marina Sagredo Pisani, opened a new casino, and in 1767 the Inquisition allowed noblewomen to frequent the casinos on the condition that they cover their faces.

Caterina Sagredo Barbarigo is the model of several famous pastel paintings of Rosalba Carriera.

== See also ==
- Madaluzza Contarini Gradenigo
