= Contarina Barbarigo =

Venetian noble

Contarina Barbarigo (died 25 December 1804), was a Venetian noble. She was a controversial member of the Venetian society and frequently mentioned in the contemporary chronicles of Venice.

She was the daughter of Gregorio Barbarigo and the famous Caterina Sagredo. She married Marin Zorzi in 1765 and divorced in 1773. She had a relationship with the politician Andrea Memmo, which lasted until 1783. Contarina Barbarigo was a leading member of the Venetian aristocracy, described as charming and made such a good impression on Emperor Joseph II on his visit in 1775 that he asked to have her, as his guide in his next visit in 1782, which was granted. In 1783, she was called before the Venetian Inquisition and sentenced to house arrest on her country villa for her free and liberal lifestyle, where she lived the rest of her life.
