= Dóm Square =

Square in Szeged, Hungary

Dóm square
- City square
- Dóm tér
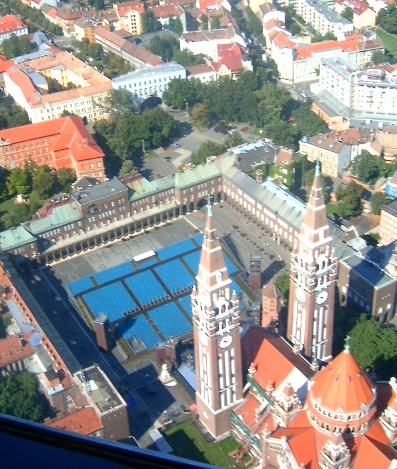
- Dóm square with the seats of the Szeged Open-air Festival
- Features: Dömötör Tower
- Opened: 1932
- Area: 12,000 m^{2} (3.0 acres)
- Surface: paving stones
- Owner: City of Szeged
- Interactive map of Dóm square
- Coordinates: 46°14′53″N 20°8′54″E

Dóm tér (literally: Cathedral Square) is a large town square in Szeged, Hungary. It is one of the largest squares in Hungary (about 12,000 m^{2}). The name Dóm tér derived from Votive Church of Szeged (Hungarian: szegedi dóm), which lies on the square. It was built from 1929 to 1932 with the surrounding university buildings. The square is also home to the medieval Dömötör Tower.

Dóm square panorama

== Sources ==
- Déry Attila, Merényi Ferenc: Magyar építészet, Budapest, Urbino, 2000. ISBN 963-00-3490-5 Dóm tér p. 190
