= Stephen (bishop of Csanád) =

Hungarian prelate and Bishop of Csanád (1156 - 1169)

- Bishop-elect of Csanád
- Installed: 1156 or earlier
- Term ended: 1169 or later
- Predecessor: Paul (?)
- Successor: Saul Győr (?)

Personal details
- Died: after 1169
- Denomination: Roman Catholic

Stephen (Hungarian: István; died after 1169) was a Hungarian prelate in the 12th century, who was elected Bishop of Csanád from around 1156 to 1169.

== Biography ==
His last known predecessor Paul is referred to as bishop in 1142. (Note: György Pray claimed that there was a certain John (I), who served as Bishop of Csanád in 1148. This data was taken by other historians, for instance, Pius Bonifacius Gams, Ágoston Mendlik and Samu Borovszky, in addition to the diocese' schematism. However, by now, no source can be found about this bishop.) Stephen is first appears as bishop-elect of Csanád in that 1156 charter, in which Martyrius, Archbishop of Esztergom donated the tithes of 70 surrounding villages to the cathedral chapter of Esztergom. The first known provost of the Arad Chapter, located in the Diocese of Csanád, Primogenitus is mentioned in that document too. Géza II of Hungary confirmed Martyrius' charter in the same year, also mentioning the name of Stephen among the testimonies.

Following the death of Géza II in 1162, Stephen became one of the four prelates – including his superior Mikó, Archbishop of Kalocsa – who assisted Géza II's brother, Stephen IV against the late king's son, Stephen III. Stephen IV's claim to the throne was promoted by the Byzantine Empire. His only preserving charter also refers to Stephen as bishop-elect in 1163. Following his downfall in the same year, Stephen and the other prelates switched to the partisans of Stephen III. Stephen appears, among the testimonies, in a charter of Stephen III (a confirmation of a last will) in 1164, without the electus suffix. He is mentioned in the same capacity in 1166. However, in the same year, he is again styled as bishop-elect of "Maros" (i.e. Csanád). Stephen, again as bishop-elect of "Maros", also acted as a witness in 1169, when Stephen III confirmed the privileges of the burghers of Šibenik.

The next bishop, Saul Győr first appears in this dignity only 1188 (according to non-authentic charters). Therefore, Kálmán Juhász considered that Stephen's episcopacy lasted long after 1169, when he is last mentioned. Accordingly, the Egres Abbey was founded under his bishopric in 1179 by Béla III of Hungary, around the same time with the Benedictine monasteries of Bizere, Gyelid, Eperjes and Hodos along the river Maros (Mureș). Throughout his episcopal reign, Stephen was never confirmed by the Holy See. Kálmán Juhász considered this was due to his defiance against Stephen III and for his support of the Byzantine interests in the early 1160s civil war.

== Sources ==
- Juhász, Kálmán (1930). A csanádi püspökség története alapításától a tatárjárásig (1030–1242) [The History of the Diocese of Csanád from its Foundation to the Mongol Invasion (1030–1242)] (in Hungarian). Csanádvármegyei Könyvtár 19–20.
- Makk, Ferenc (1989). The Árpáds and the Comneni: Political Relations between Hungary and Byzantium in the 12th century (Translated by György Novák). Akadémiai Kiadó. ISBN 963-05-5268-X.
- Zsoldos, Attila (2011). Magyarország világi archontológiája, 1000–1301 [Secular Archontology of Hungary, 1000–1301] (in Hungarian). História, MTA Történettudományi Intézete. ISBN 978-963-9627-38-3.

Catholic Church titles
Preceded by Paul (?)	Bishop-elect of Csanád; 1156–1169	Succeeded by Saul Győr (?)
