= Bestertius =

12th-century Hungarian bishop

- Bishop of Csanád
- Installed: 1138 or earlier
- Term ended: 1138/1142
- Predecessor: Lawrence (?)
- Successor: Paul

Personal details
- Died: after 1138
- Denomination: Roman Catholic

Bestertius (Hungarian: Beszteréd; died after 1138) was a Hungarian prelate in the 12th century, who served as Bishop of Csanád around 1138.

== Biography ==
He became bishop sometime after 1113, when his last known predecessor Lawrence is mentioned. His name appears among the testimonies in that document, in which Béla II of Hungary listed the estates and privileges of the Dömös Chapter in 1138. It is plausible that Bestertius was the bishop, when Béla II founded the Arad Chapter around 1135, exempting it from the jurisdiction of the Diocese of Csanád. Bestertius was succeeded by Paul, who is mentioned in this capacity in 1142.

== Sources ==
- Juhász, Kálmán (1930). A csanádi püspökség története alapításától a tatárjárásig (1030–1242) [The History of the Diocese of Csanád from its Foundation to the Mongol Invasion (1030–1242)] (in Hungarian). Csanádvármegyei Könyvtár 19–20.
- Zsoldos, Attila (2011). Magyarország világi archontológiája, 1000–1301 [Secular Archontology of Hungary, 1000–1301] (in Hungarian). História, MTA Történettudományi Intézete. ISBN 978-963-9627-38-3.

Catholic Church titles
Preceded by Lawrence (?)	Bishop of Csanád fl. 1138	Succeeded by Paul
