= Dömötör Tower =

Building in Szeged, Hungary

Coordinates: 46°14′55″N 20°08′55″E

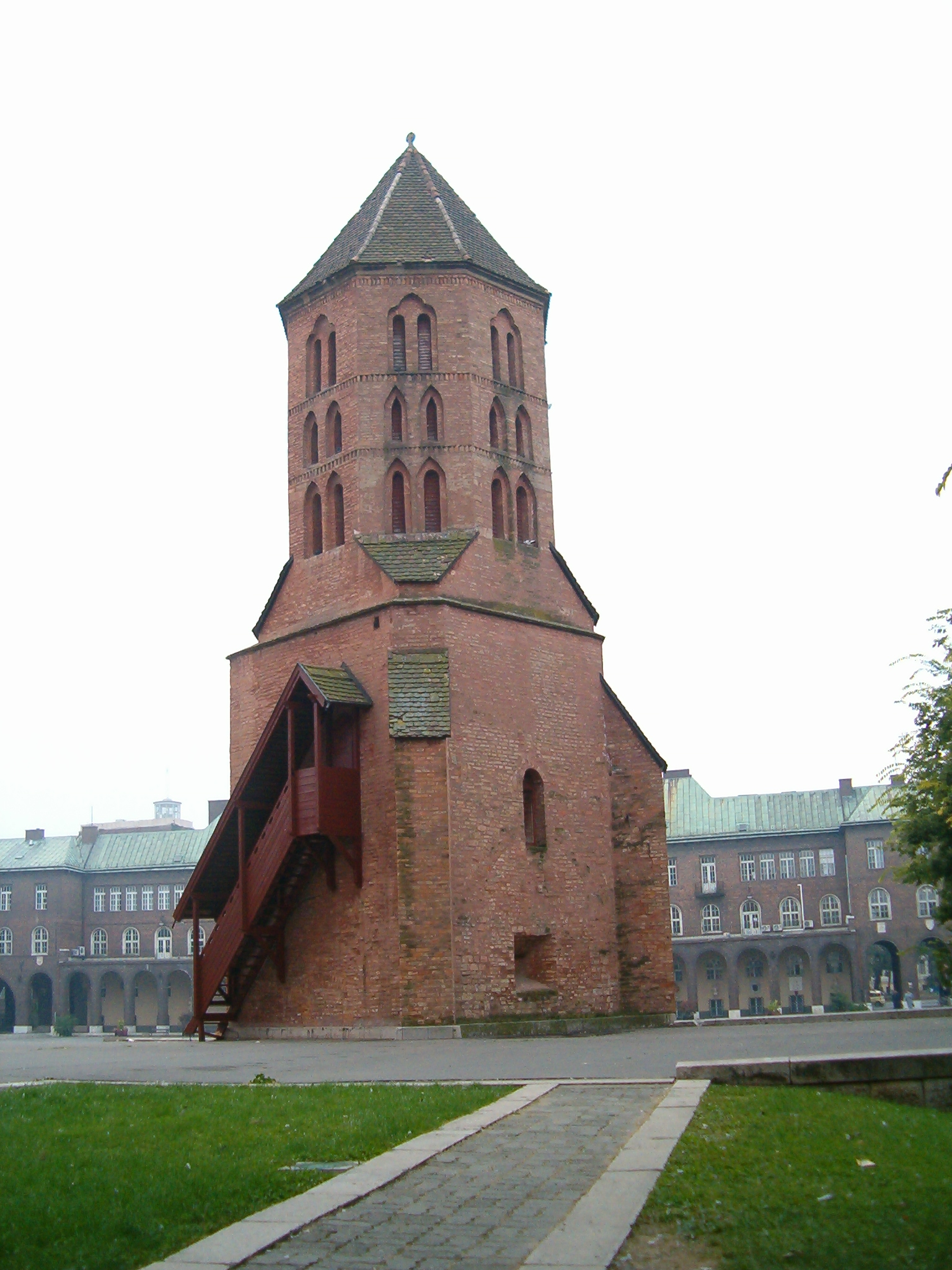
The Dömötör tower

The Dömötör tower is the oldest building in Szeged, Hungary. The foundation was most probably laid during the 11th century, while the lower part was built (in Romanesque style) from the 12th century, and the upper part (Gothic style) from the 13th century. The tower was once part of the former Szent Dömötör templom (St. Demetrius church), but today it stands in Dóm Square, in front of the much larger Votive Church of Szeged. The tower is the only surviving part of that church: during the construction of the Votive Church it was nearly pulled down, but it was kept as the new church's baptismal chapel. The upper part was rebuilt from the original stones in 1926. The architecture of the tower is similar to another found in Southern France, or in the territory of the former Byzantine Empire.

== Features ==
On the upper part, there are 48 pointed windows in three levels (sixteen on each level, two on every side of the octagonal levels). On the lower part, a gate was cut and turned to a baptismal chapel in 1931. Above the gate there is a replica of the oldest sculpture in Szeged, the "Kőbárány" (stone lamb), an agnus dei (Lamb of God) representation from the early 12th century. The replica replaced the original sculpture in 1991.

Inside the tower, there is a fresco by Vilmos Aba-Novák of the baptism of Hungarians in the 11th century. (Note: The Szeged tourist office describes the fresco as a depiction of the Baptism of Christ.) Due to the mould growing on the rear wall, the baptismal chapel is no longer in use.

Roman-era stones were built into the arches of the doorway. The tower is now part of the cathedral's visitor centre, with an exhibition on the history of baptism on its first floor and one on the architectural history of the tower on its second floor.

=== Gate of Life ===
The tower's "Gate of Life" was made by János Bille in 1931 and explains a Christian life through symbols. At the top and at the bottom, there are two numbers: 1272 and 1931. The former was thought to represent the year in which the upper part was built, while 1931 is when it was turned to a baptismal chapel. There are 20 symbols, not including the numbers, the first one an Alpha and the last an Omega. The Alpha and the Omega were symbols of Jesus Christ, and birth and death.
