= Paul (bishop of Csanád) =

Hungarian prelate (died after 1142)

- Bishop of Csanád
- Installed: 1138/1142
- Term ended: 1142 or after
- Predecessor: Bestertius
- Successor: Stephen (?)

Personal details
- Died: after 1142
- Denomination: Roman Catholic

Paul (Hungarian: Pál; died after 1142) was a Hungarian prelate in the 12th century, who served as Bishop of Csanád around 1142.

== Biography ==
He became bishop sometime after 1138, when his last known predecessor Bestertius is mentioned. His name appears among the signatories of that document, in which the young Géza II of Hungary confirmed the privileges of the citizens of Split in Dalmatia in May 1142. This is the only information about Paul's episcopacy. The next known bishop is Stephen, who is first mentioned in this capacity in 1156.

Some 19th-century historians – István Horváth and Gusztáv Wenzel – who placed the time of creation of the Gesta Hungarorum to the mid-12th century, considered that Paul was identical with the gesta's anonymous author (also known as Master P.). According to this theory, Paul formerly served as a notary in the court of Béla II. Emil Jakubovich and Kálmán Juhász claimed that Anonymus (Paul?) wrote the Gesta Hungarorum sometime between 1141 and 1152. Juhász emphasized that the author knows the topography of the Diocese of Csanád well and in detail. However, majority of the historiography accepts that Anonymus was the notary of Béla III (r. 1172–1196).

== Sources ==
- Juhász, Kálmán (1930). A csanádi püspökség története alapításától a tatárjárásig (1030–1242) [The History of the Diocese of Csanád from its Foundation to the Mongol Invasion (1030–1242)] (in Hungarian). Csanádvármegyei Könyvtár 19–20.
- Zsoldos, Attila (2011). Magyarország világi archontológiája, 1000–1301 [Secular Archontology of Hungary, 1000–1301] (in Hungarian). História, MTA Történettudományi Intézete. ISBN 978-963-9627-38-3.

Catholic Church titles
Preceded by Bestertius	Bishop of Csanád fl. 1142	Succeeded by Stephen (?)
