= Gerard of Csanád =

Italian Catholic saint (died 1046)

Saint Gerard of Csanád O.S.B.
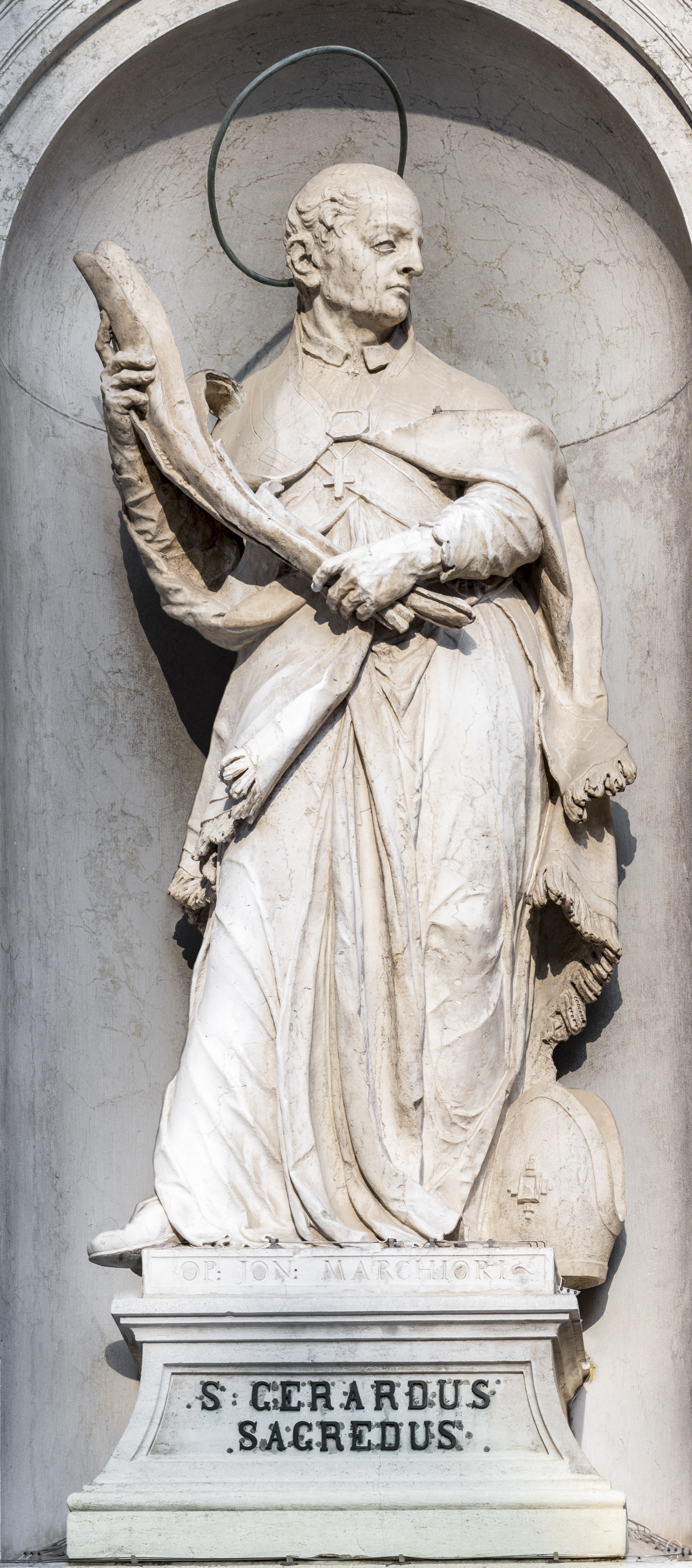
- Statue of St. Gerard in San Rocco, Venice.

Apostle of Hungary Martyr of Hungary Monk & Bishop
- Born: 977/1000; Venice, Republic of Venice
- Died: 24 September 1046; Buda, Kingdom of Hungary
- Venerated in: Catholic Church; Eastern Orthodox Church
- Canonized: 1083 by Pope Gregory VII
- Feast: 24 September
- Patronage: Hungary, Budapest

Gerard or Gerard Sagredo (Hungarian: Gellért; Italian: Gerardo di Sagredo; Latin: Gerardus; 23 April 977/1000 – 24 September 1046) was the first bishop of Csanád in the Kingdom of Hungary from around 1030 to his death. Most information about his life was preserved in his legends, which contains most of the conventional elements of medieval saints' biographies. He was born in a Venetian noble family, associated with the Sagredo or Morosini families in sources written centuries later. At the age of five, after a serious illness, he was sent to the newly-founded Benedictine San Giorgio Monastery. He received an excellent monastic education and also learnt grammar, music, philosophy, and law.

He left Venice on a pilgrimage to the Holy Land around 1020, but a storm compelled him to break his journey near Istria. He decided to visit the Kingdom of Hungary. Maurus, bishop of Pécs, and King Stephen I of Hungary convinced him to discontinue his pilgrimage, emphasizing that Gerard's preaching could accelerate the conversion of the Hungarians. Gerard was made the tutor of the king's son and heir, Emeric. Before long, Gerard went to the Bakony Hills to live as a hermit near Bakonybél. Stephen I made him the first bishop of the newly established Diocese of Csanád (encompassing present-day Banat in Serbia, Romania and Hungary) around 1030. Benedictine monks who spoke Hungarian helped him preach to the local inhabitants.

== Sources ==
Most information about Gerard was not preserved in impartial sources, but in his hagiographies. The Short Life of Saint Gerard, which was composed around 1100, is an abridgement of an earlier biography. The earlier biography did not survive. The Short Life primarily presents Gerard as a bishop. The majority of scholars regard the Short Life the most reliable source of Gerard's life.

The Long Life of Saint Gerard is a compilation of multiple sources, including the biography that the author of the shorter legend had also utilized. The Long Life was completed in the late 13th century or in the 14th century. It was regarded as a source of absolute reliability for centuries, but this view radically changed in the 20th century. György Györffy even stated that the Long Life was a forgery. Historian Gábor Klaniczay also emphasizes that the longer legend contains obviously anachronistic elements. On the other hand, Carlile Aylmer Macartney says that the Long Life preserved the original form of Gerard's earliest (now lost) biography.

Gerard's own work, the Deliberatio supra hymnum trium puerorum also contains references to his life. Simon of Kéza's chronicle and the Illuminated Chronicle preserved fragments from the common source of Gerard's two Lives. A 13th-century rhymed version (or chant) of Gerard's legend was also preserved, but it does not contain more information than the Short Life.

== Family and youth ==
Gerard's Long Life dedicates two chapters to his family and childhood. Conventional elements of medieval hagiographies abound in both chapters, suggesting that the author borrowed many motives from other legends, especially from the Life of Saint Adalbert of Prague. Gerard was born in Venice in a noble family. The noble origin of saintly hermits was often emphasized in their legends.

The identification of Gerard's family is uncertain. An expanded version of Petrus de Natalibus's Catalogue of Saints, which was published in 1516, identified Gerard as a member of the Sagredo family. Although the family was granted Venetian nobility only in the 14th century, some scholars (including Fabio Banfi) accept the Sagredos' claim to their kinship with Saint Gerard. Historian László Szegfű says that Gerard was actually a Morosini.

Gerard's father, who was also named Gerard, and mother, Catherine, had awaited his birth for three years. They baptised their son George because he was born on the feast of Saint George (23 April). The year of his birth is unknown, but he was born between 977 and 1000. He was renamed in the memory of his father, who died during a pilgrimage or journey (anachronistically mentioned in Gerard's Long Life as a crusade).

== Ecclesiastic career ==
=== Benedictine monk ===
At the age of five, Gerard was taken seriously ill. His recovery was attributed to the prayers of the Benedictine monks of the San Giorgio Monastery in Venice. His family soon sent him to the monastery, offering him to spiritual life. Gerard took the "religious cloth" and was educated in the monastery. He could read and write and knew the basic elements of arithmetic. His Long Life emphasizes that Gerard strictly observed the rules of monastic life and wore coarse cloths to "mortify his body". He also studied the "words of the prophets and the speeches of the Orthodox apostles". The use of certain expressions (including dux verbi, or "leader of the Word") suggests that Gerard read Pseudo-Dionysius the Areopagite in Greek.

After the founding abbot of the monastery, John Morosini, died in 1012, Gerard was appointed prior to administer the monastery until the new abbot, Guglielmo, was elected. Guglielmo sent Gerard to "Bologna" to study grammar, music, philosophy and law. Gerard mentioned his stay in Gaul, where he read Plato, suggesting that the original version of the Long Life or its source referred to his studies in Burgundy instead of Bologna. Gerard returned to the San Giorgio Monastery five years later. His Long Life writes that Gerard was made abbot although he had been opposed to his election. No information about his activities as abbot was preserved in the sources, implying that he actually never held that office.

Gerard left for a pilgrimage to the Holy Land. According to his Long Life, he wanted to follow the example of Saint Jerome. Modern historians say that internal strifes (armed conflicts between the Orseolos and their opponents) compelled him to leave the town around 1018 or 1021. A storm forced him to seek refuge in a Benedictine monastery on an island near Istria. In the monastery, he met one Rasina. Historian György Györffy associates Rasina with Radla, a close companion of Adalbert of Prague; László Mezey writes that Rasina was the abbot of the Saint Martin Monastery in Lussino. Rasina persuaded Gerard to accompany him to Hungary, saying that "nowhere else in the world could one find today a more suitable place to win souls for the Lord". The conversion of the Hungarians had started in the 970s, but it accelerated only around 1000. The systematic organization of the Church began during the reign of the first king of Hungary, Stephen I of Hungary, who was crowned on the first day of the new millennium.

=== Royal tutor and hermit ===
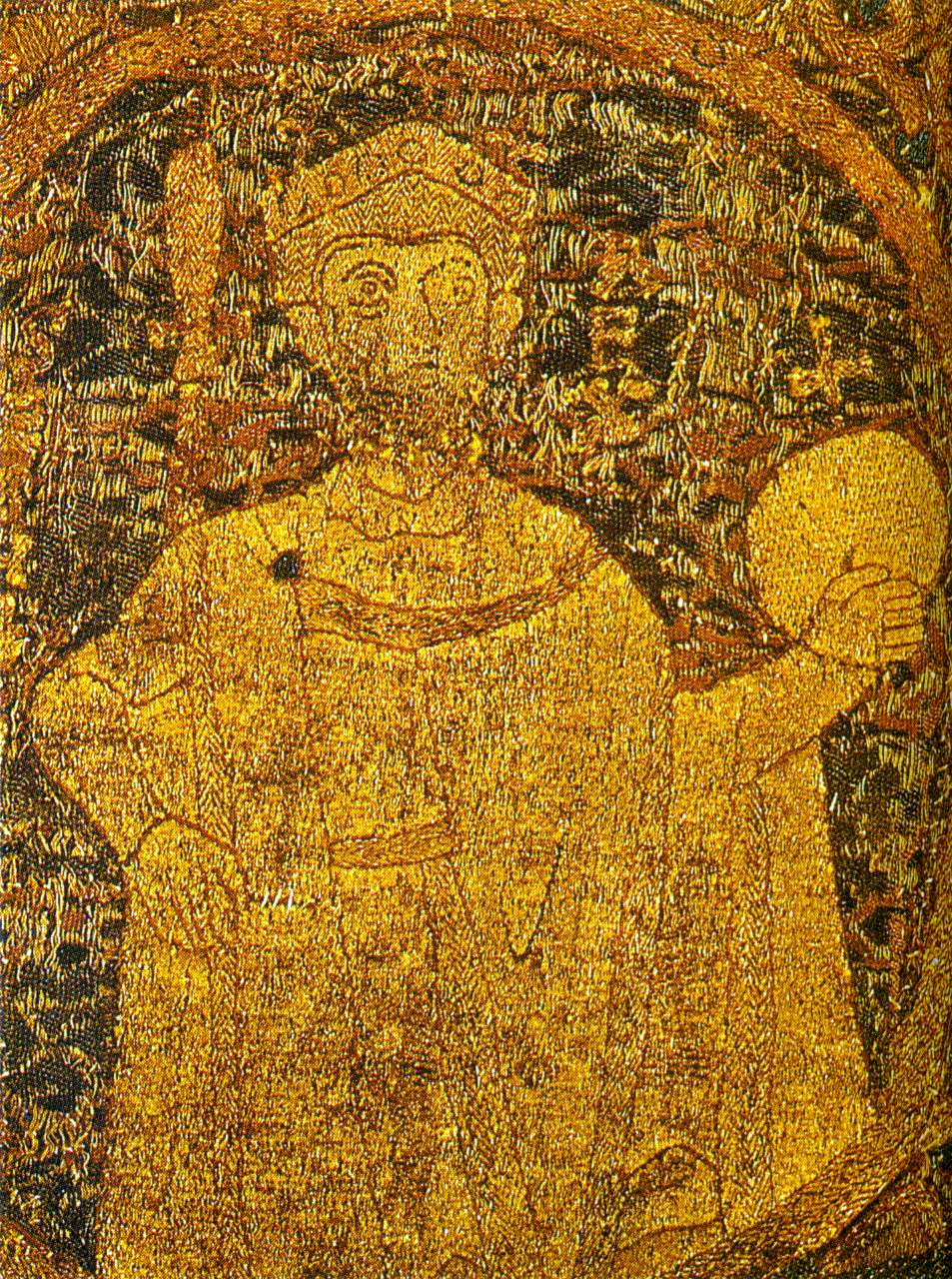
Portrayal of Stephen I of Hungary who convinced Gerard to stay in Hungary instead of travelling to the Holy Land

Gerard and Rasina visited Zara, Knin and Senj before reaching Pécs in Hungary. Gerard met Maurus, bishop of Pécs, and Anastasius, Abbot of Pécsvárad, in Pécs. The two prelates wanted to persuade Gerard to stay in Hungary, stating that "God's will" had brought him to the country. After Gerard gave sermons in their presence, Maurus and Anastasius stated that he was a "master of the word", declaring that such a cleric had never visited Hungary.

Maurus and Anastasius convinced Gerard, who wanted to continue his pilgrimage to the Holy Land, to meet King Stephen I in Székesfehérvár. During their meeting, the king emphasized that his realm was the most suitable place for Gerard "to serve God", promising that he would authorize Gerard to preach anywhere in Hungary. Stephen I even threatened Gerard that he would not allow him to continue his journey to Jerusalem, and also alluded that he would make Gerard a bishop. Finally, Gerard accepted Stephen's proposal and decided to stay in Hungary. Before long, on the Feast of the Assumption (15 August), Gerard gave a sermon in honor of the "Woman clothed with the Sun", which was the first recorded sign of the cult of Virgin Mary in Hungary. According to Macartney, the description of Gerard's journey to Hungary and his meetings with the two prelates and the king were incorporated into the Long Life based on a nearly contemporaneous report, but they contain evidently imaginary details, such as the conversations between Gerard and Stephen I.

Gerard was made the tutor of Stephen's son and heir, Emeric. Gerard's role as the crown prince's tutor was only mentioned in the Long Life, implying that this was only an invention by the hagiographer who wanted to create a strong connection between the three most important saints of the early Kingdom of Hungary, but the story is not certainly invented. Szegfű writes that Gerard may have influenced Stephen's Admonitions to Emeric. László Mezey proposes that Gerard was only responsible for the spiritual education of Emeric.

After Emeric's education was completed, Gerard settled in the Bakony Hills to live as a hermit near Bakonybél, at a place where the saintly Gunther of Bohemia had lived. Szegfű says that Gerard's withdrawal from the royal court was the consequence of the arrival of the family of the Doge Otto Orseolo to Hungary around 1024. During the following years, Gerard built a chapel at the foot of a hill, and wrote theological studies and homilies (which were later lost). He referred to the commentaries that he had written to the Epistle to the Hebrews and to the Prologue to the Gospel of John. Gerard lived as a hermit for seven years, which suggests that he must have spent several years in the Bakony Hills even if the author of his legend only invented the symbolic number seven.

=== Bishop of Csanád ===
A powerful chieftain, Ajtony, ruled the region near the rivers Tisza, Danube and Mureș in the early 11th century. He was baptised according to the "Greek rite" and settled "Greek" (or Byzantine) monks in his seat on the Mureș. After Ajtony began taxing the salt carried on the Mureș, Stephen I of Hungary sent the royal army against him under the command of Csanád, who had previously been Ajtony's commander. Csanád defeated and killed Ajtony, whose domain was transformed into a county. Ajtony's seat was renamed for Csanád.

After the conquest of Ajtony's territory, Stephen I summoned Gerard from his hermitage and made him bishop of the newly established Diocese of Csanád. László Mezey says that the king appointed Gerard to administer the diocese because Gerard's knowledge of the Greek language and the Byzantine theological ideas enabled him to preach in a territory where Greek priests had up to that time proselytized. The Annales Posonienses recorded that "Gerard was consecrated bishop" in 1030, but historians have not universally accepted the reliability of this date. The king appointed twelve monks from the Benedictine monasteries in Hungary to accompany Gerard to his see. Seven of the twelve monks who could speak Hungarian were tasked with interpreting for Gerard among Ajtony's former subjects. The Greek monks who had arrived during Ajtony's rule were transferred from Csanád to a monastery newly established at Oroszlámos (present-day Banatsko Aranđelovo in Serbia), and their former monastery was granted to the Benedictines.

Gerard and the Benedictine monks shared a house, and he forbade them to leave it without his authorization. The monks were required to be present for the morning service and to wear monastic costume. Gerard continued to wear the habits of a hermit (cilice or goat skins) and spent days in solitude in the forests near his see. His legend also writes that he often "took the axe" to cut wood to "mortify his flesh" and to help "those who had to do this work".

Gerard was a missionary bishop, tasked with converting the pagan inhabitants of his diocese. His Long Life writes that people came to Gerard, "noblemen and commoners, rich and poor", asking him to baptize them "in the name of the Holy Trinity". They brought horses, cattle, sheep, carpets, rings and necklaces to give them to the bishop. The Long Life credits Gerard with the building of churches "for every city" in his diocese to serve the growing number of believers. Although the Long Life attributes the establishment of the archdeaconries of Gerard's diocese to him, most scholars regard this statement as a clear anachronism. Gerard regularly visited Stephen. During a travel from Csanád to the royal court in Székesfehérvár or Esztergom, he and one of his clerics, Walther, stayed in a manor where a slave woman was singing while making flour on a grinder. Gerard referred to the music as the "symphonia Ungarorum" (or "drum of the Hungarians"), associating the sound of the grinder with a drum roll. Being touched by her cheerfulness while doing hard work, Gerard gave the woman precious gifts.

Stephen I died on 15 August 1038. His nephew, the Venetian Peter Orseolo, mounted the throne, but he was dethroned in 1041. Peter's successor, Samuel Aba, had many lords executed. He visited Csanád, asking Gerard to put a crown on his head during the mass on Resurrection Sunday. He refused Aba, but the bishops who accompanied the king to Csanád performed the coronation. Gerard went to the pulpit, declaring that the "sword of vengeance will descend" upon Aba's head in three years, because he had gained the kingdom by deceit. The credibility of the report of the Long Life of Aba's visit to Gerard's see is subject to scholarly debates.

== Martyrdom ==
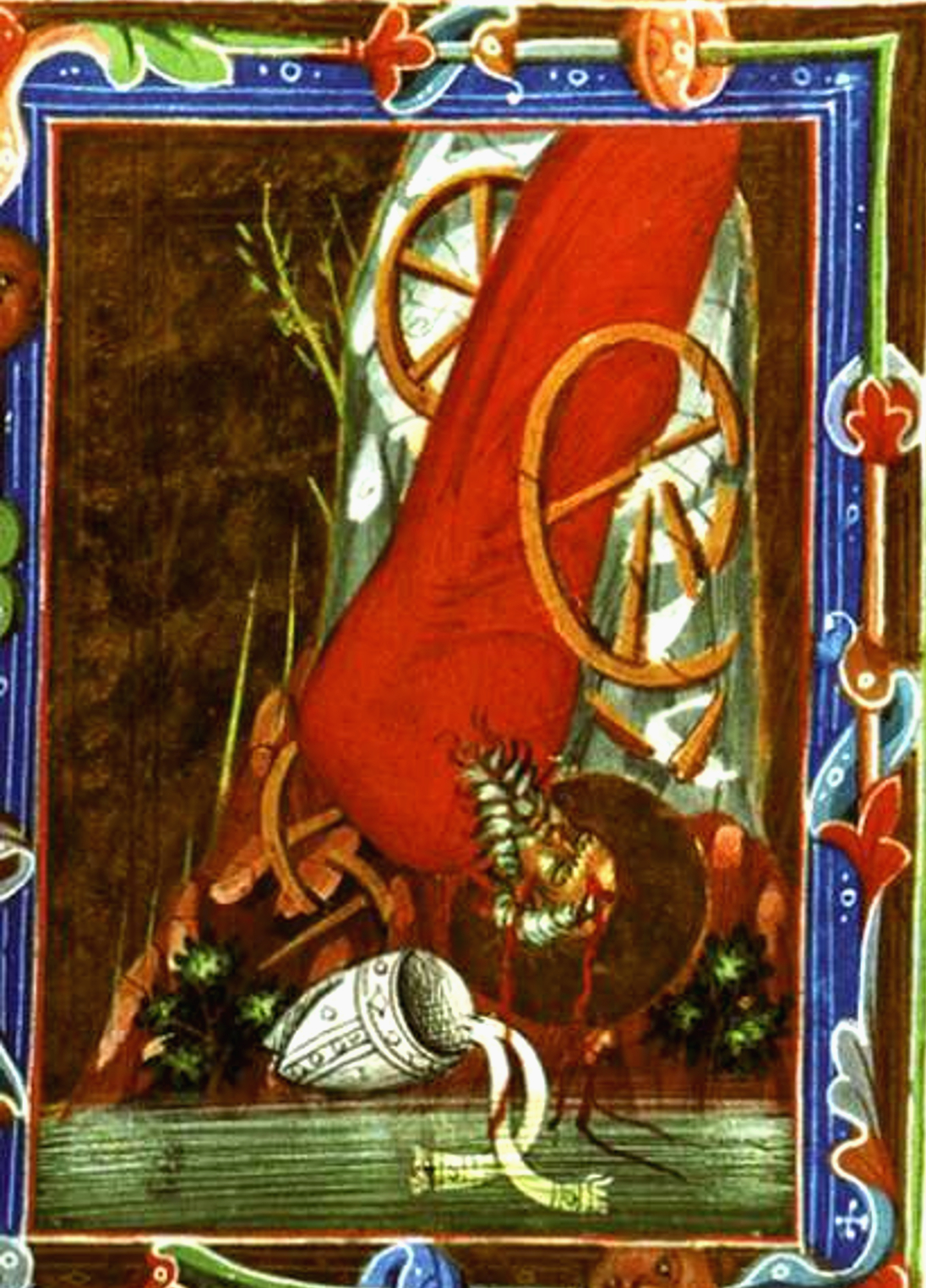
A miniature from the Anjou Legendarium showing St. Gerard falling to his death (1330)

The Holy Roman Emperor, Henry III, invaded Hungary and defeated Aba in the Battle of Ménfő in 1044. Peter Orseolo was restored, but his rule was unpopular, because he favored his German and Italian retainers.

Gerard's martyrdom occurred on 24 September 1046, during the Vata pagan uprising. His co-martyrs were Bystrik and Buldus. There are various accounts of his death. According to one, he was stoned, pierced with a lance, and his body thrown from the Blocksberg cliff into the Danube. An alternate account claims that he was placed on a two-wheel cart, hauled to the hilltop and rolled down a hill of Buda, now named Gellért Hill, then still being alive at the bottom, was beaten to death. Other unverified tales report him as being put into a spiked barrel and rolled down the hill during a mass revolt of pagans.

Canonized in 1083, along with St. Stephen and St. Emeric, Gerard is currently one of the patron saints of Hungary. His feast day is 24 September.

== See also ==
- Banat in the Middle Ages

== Sources ==
- Györffy, György (1994). King Saint Stephen of Hungary. Atlantic Research and Publications. ISBN 0-88033-300-6.
- Jékely, Zsombor (2004). "Gerard of Csanád". In Jestice, Phyllis G. (ed.). Holy People of the World: A Cross-Cultural Encyclopedia, Volume I: Entries A to G. ABC Clio. p. 304. ISBN 1-57607-355-6.
- Kristó, Gyula (2001). "The Life of King Stephen the Saint". In Zsoldos, Attila (ed.). Saint Stephen and His Country: A Newborn Kingdom in Central Europe – Hungary. Lucidus Kiadó. pp. 15–36. ISBN 963-86163-9-3.
- Macartney, C. A. (1953). The Medieval Hungarian Historians: A Critical & Analytical Guide. Cambridge University Press. ISBN 978-0-521-08051-4.
- Mészáros, István (1996). "Gellért püspök szimfóniája [Bishop Gerard's symphony] [Problems in connection with Gerard]". In Horánszky, Nándor (ed.). Szent Gellért Emlékkönyv [Essays Published in Honor of St Gerard] (in Hungarian). Szent Gellért Plébánia. pp. 103–105. ISBN 963-00-1972-8.
- Mezey, László (1996). "Gellért-problémák [Problems in connection with Gerard]". In Horánszky, Nándor (ed.). Szent Gellért Emlékkönyv [Essays Published in Honor of St Gerard] (in Hungarian). Szent Gellért Plébánia. pp. 55–64. ISBN 963-00-1972-8.
- Rothenberg, David J. (2011). The Flower of Paradise: Marian Devotion and Secular Song in Medieval and Renaissance Music. Oxford University Press. ISBN 978-0-19-539971-4.
- Szegfű, László (1994). "Gellért, Szent [St Gerard]". In Kristó, Gyula; Engel, Pál; Makk, Ferenc (eds.). Korai magyar történeti lexikon (9–14. század) [=Encyclopedia of the Early Hungarian History (9th–14th centuries)] (in Hungarian). Akadémiai Kiadó. p. 231. ISBN 963-05-6722-9.
- Thomas, Sarah Fawcett (1995). Butler's Lives of the Saints: September, New Full Edition. Burns & Oates, The Liturgical Press. ISBN 0-86012-258-1.
- Thoroczkay, Gábor (2001). "The Dioceses and Bishops of Saint Stephen". In Zsoldos, Attila (ed.). Saint Stephen and His Country: A Newborn Kingdom in Central Europe – Hungary. Lucidus Kiadó. pp. 49–68. ISBN 963-86163-9-3.
- Turcuș, Șerban (2006). Saint Gerard of Cenad: The Destiny of a Venetian around the Year One Thousand. Romanian Cultural Institute, Center for Transylvanian Studies. ISBN 978-973-7784-10-0.

Catholic Church titles
Preceded by New title	Bishop of Csanád; 1030–1046	Succeeded by Maurus
