= Diocese of Szeged–Csanád =

Latin Catholic diocese in Hungary

Diocese of Szeged–Csanád Dioecesis Szegediensis–Csanadiensis Szeged-Csanádi egyházmegye

Catholic
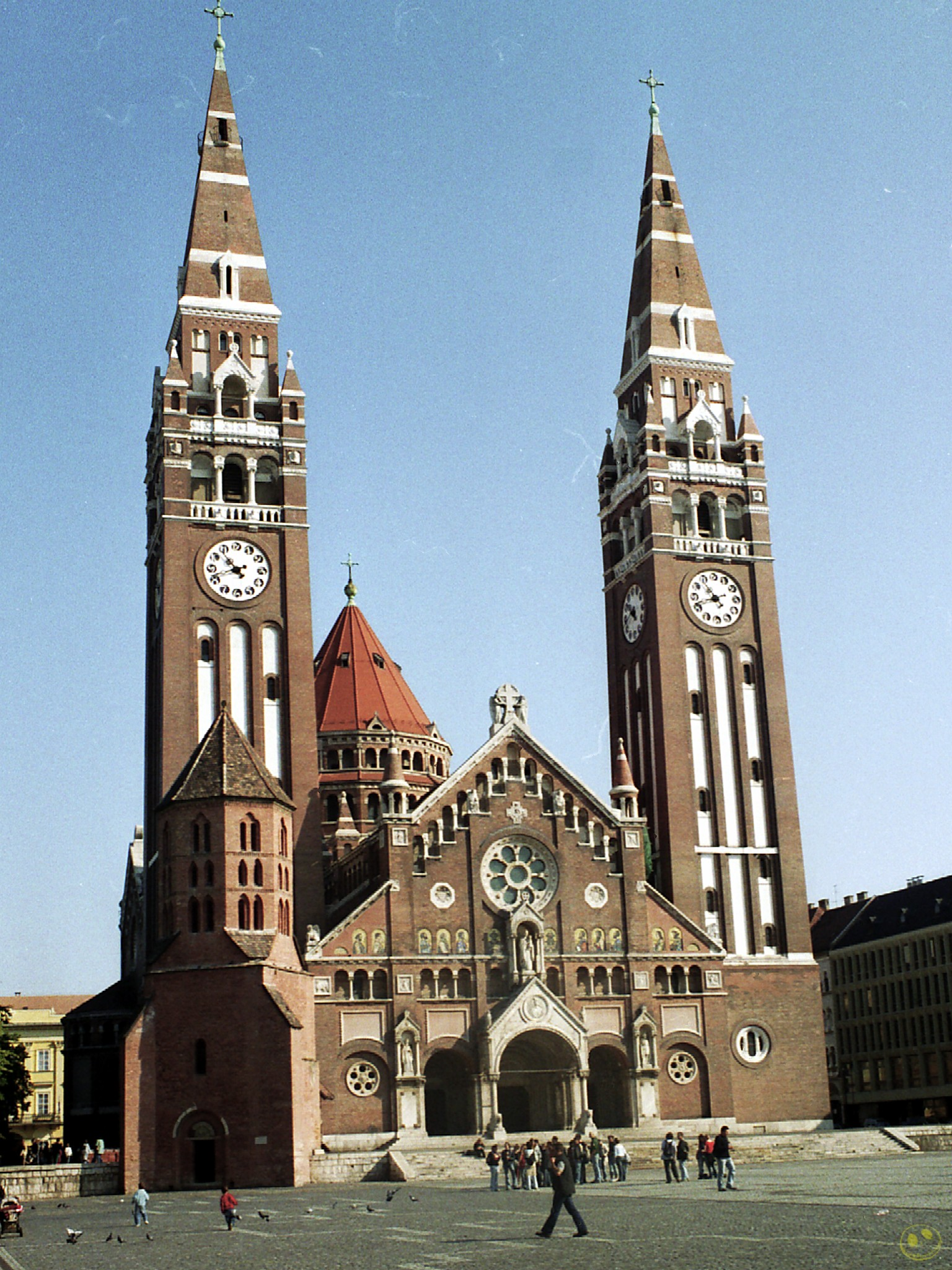
- The Cathedral of Our Lady of the Hungarians Szeged

Location
- Country: Hungary
- Ecclesiastical province: Kalocsa-Kecskemét
- Metropolitan: Kalocsa-Kecskemét
- Headquarters: Szeged
- Coordinates: 46°14′56″N 20°08′58″E

Statistics
- Area: 10,851 km^{2} (4,190 sq mi)
- Population: Total; Catholics: (as of 2014); 889,000; 363,500 (40.9%)

Information
- First holder: Gerard of Csanád
- Denomination: Catholic Church
- Sui iuris church: Latin Church
- Rite: Roman Rite
- Established: 1030
- Cathedral: Cathedral of Our Lady of the Hungarians
- Patron saint: Gerard of Csanád

Current leadership
- Pope: Leo XIV
- Bishop: László Kiss-Rigó
- Metropolitan Archbishop: Balázs Bábel

Map
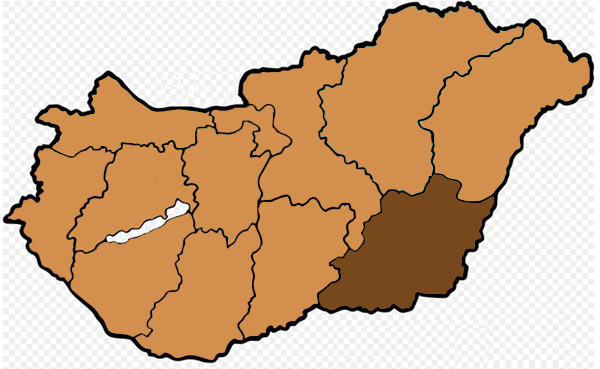

Website
- szeged-csanad.hu

The Diocese of Szeged–Csanád (Latin: Dioecesis Szegediensis–Csanadiensis) is a Latin Church diocese of the Catholic Church located in the cities of Szeged and Csanád in the ecclesiastical province of Kalocsa-Kecskemét in Hungary.

The diocesan cathedral is since 1930 the Cathedral of Our Lady of the Hungarians in Szeged. The previous cathedral was St George's Cathedral in Timișoara (Cathedral of the Diocese of Timișoara after 1930).

The Co-Cathedral of St. Anthony of Padua is based in Békéscsaba.

== History ==
- 1030: Established as Diocese of Csanád by King Stephen
- 1930: Csanád became part of the new Roman Catholic Diocese of Timișoara but the hungarian diocese retained the name of "Diocese of Csanád"
- August 5, 1982: Renamed as Diocese of Szeged–Csanád.

== List of bishops ==
- 1030–1046 St Gerard
- 1046–1053 Maurus
- 1053–1083 two unknown bishops
- 1083–1113 Lawrence
- fl. 1138 Bestertius
- fl. 1142 Paul
- 1156–1169 Stephen (elected)
- 1188–1192 Saul Győr
- 1192–1193 Crispin
- 1198–1201 John I
- 1202–1228 Desiderius
- 1229–1254 Bulcsú Lád
- 1259–1275 Briccius
- 1275–1293 Gregory I
- 1298–1307 Anthony I
- 1307–1332 Benedict
- 1332–1343 Jakab Piancenzai
- 1343–1344 István II Harcsáki (Büki)
- 1344 Galhard de Carceribus
- 1345–1350 Gergely II Kapronczai
- 1350–1358 Tamás I Telegdi
- 1359–1360 Gergely III Lendvai (Fugyi)
- 1360–1373 Domonkos Bebek
- 1373–1375 Miklós I
- 1377–1379 Pál II Péterfia
- 1379–1380 Tamás II
- 1380–1386 János II Czudar
- 1386–1395 János III
- 1395–1397 Lukács I Órévi
- 1397–1402 Gergely IV Szeri Pósafi
- 1403–1423 Dózsa Marczalli
- 1423–1443 László I Marczalli
  - 1434–1438 Albert I Kerolti
- 1438–1457 Péter I Remetei Himfi
- 1457–1466 Albert II Hangácsi
- 1466–1493 János IV Szokoli
- 1493–1500 Lukács II Szegedi Baratin
- 1500–1514 Miklós II Körösszegi Csáki
- 1514–1526 Ferenc I Csaholi
- 1526–1529 János V Musinai Gerván
- 1529–1537 János VI Bonzagnó
- 1537–1552 János VII Barlabássy
- 1553–1554 Ferenc II Medgyesi Székely
- 1556–1558 György I Bódy
- 1559–1561 Péter II Kapronczay Paulinus
- 1561–1562 János VIII Kolozsváry
- 1562–1563 András Dudich
- 1563–1572 Gergely V Bornemissza
- 1572–1582 Boldizsár Persei Melegh
- 1582–1587 István III Mathisy
- 1587–1597 Pál III Szegedy
- 1598–1608 Faustus Verancsics
- 1608–1623 Matthias I Herovich
- 1623–1625 Emmerich I Lósy
- 1625–1637 György II Dubovszky
- 1637–1643 János IX Szederkényi Püsky
- 1643 György III Pohronczi Szelepcsényi
- 1643–1644 György IV Széchenyi
- 1644–1648 Zsigmond I Szenttamási Zsongor
- 1648–1650 Matthias II Alsőlelóczi Tarnóczy
- 1651–1652 István IV Rohonczy
- 1653–1657 Tamás III Erdődy Pálffy
- 1658–1672 Jácint Macripodari
- 1672–1678 Ferdinand Erdődy Pálffy
- 1678–1681 János X Kéry
- 1681–1685 Miklós III Galánthai Balogh
- 1685–1686 György V Fenessy oder Fényessy
- 1686–1689 Mihály I Lipótfalvy Dvornikovics
- 1689–1699 István V Telekessy
- 1699 Ferenc III Jany
- 1699–1707 István VI Dolny
- 1708- Zsigmond II Ordody
- 1710 Ferenc IV Lapsánszky
- 1710–1730 László II Nádasdy
- 1730–1739 Adalbert von Falkenstein
- 1739–1750 Nikola Stanislavič
- 1750–1777 Franz Anton Engl Graf von Wagrain
- 1777–1798 Emmerich Christovich
- 1800–1828 Ladislaus Kőszeghy von Remete
- 1829–1832 Anton Török
- 1834–1850 József Lonovics. (Note: Correspondence sent by Bishop Lonovics to Pope Gregory XVI on behalf of the bishops of Hungary is referred to by Gregory in a letter to the Hungarian prelates, Quas Vestro, sent in April 1841.)
  - 1848–1849 Mihály Horváth (elected)
- 1851–1860 Sándor Csajághy
- 1860–1889 Sándor II Bonnaz
- 1890–1907 Alexander III Dessewffy Cserneki és Tarkeői
- 1908–1911 János XI Csernoch
- 1911–1943 Gyula Móri Glattfelder
- 1943–1944 Sándor IV Raskó (Apostolic Administrator)
- 1944–1964 Endre II Hamvas
- 1964–1969 József II Ijjas (Apostolic Administrator)
- 1969–1987 József III Udvardy
- 1987–2006 Endre Gyulay
- 2006 László Kiss-Rigó

== See also ==
- Catholic Church in Hungary
- Roman Catholic Diocese of Timișoara
- Roman Catholic Diocese of Zrenjanin

== Sources ==
- GCatholic.org
- Catholic Hierarchy
