= Sagredo family =

Aristocratic Venetian family

Sagredo
- Family
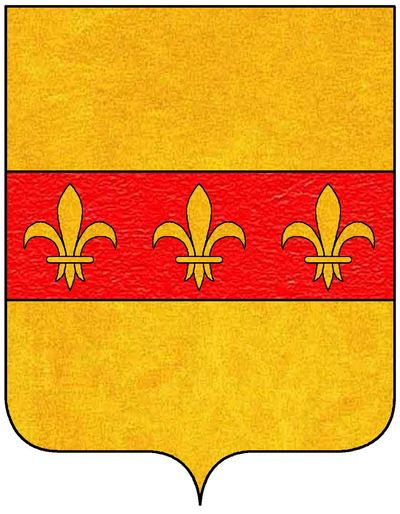
- Coat of arms of Sagredo family

The House of Sagredo was an aristocratic Venetian family that gave rise to one doge.

== Notable members ==
- Nicolò Sagredo - Ambassador and Doge of the Republic
- Giovanni Francesco Sagredo - Mathematician and friend of Galileo
- Zaccaria Sagredo - Patron of arts in Venice
- Caterina Sagredo Barbarigo - 18th century Casino owner

== Palace ==
- Ca' Sagredo - Palace on the Grand Canal of Venice
- Sagredo Chapel in San Francesco della Vigna
