= Long Life of Saint Gerard =

Hagiography of Bishop Gerard of Csanád

The Long Life of Saint Gerard (Latin: Legenda maior S. Gerardi), also known as Long Life of Saint Gerald or Passion of Saint Gerard, is the hagiography of Bishop Gerard of Csanád, who was murdered by pagan Hungarians in 1046. The longer version of his legends was compiled from earlier sources in the early 14th century.

== Bishop St Gerard ==
Gerard was born in Venice in or shortly after 977. His father was a member of the Morosini or Sagredo family.

== Manuscripts and editions ==
The text was preserved in two codices. The older manuscript was written in the 15th century. The other manuscript is an almost verbatim copy of the older codex. The first manuscript is held in the Austrian National Library in Vienna, the other codex in the Munich Public Library. Other variants of the text also existed because a 16th-century legend of St Gerard, published in Venice, was based on a version different from the ones preserved in the two codices.

== Sources ==
The Long Life of Saint Gerard is an early-14th-century compilation of multiple sources, including family legends.

== Text ==
The first three chapters of the Legend narrates the would-be saint's early life.

== Sources ==
- Curta, Florin (2001). "Transylvania around A.D. 1000". In Urbańczyk, Przemysław (ed.). Europe around the year 1000. Wydawn. DiG. pp. 141–165. ISBN 978-837-1-8121-18.
- Curta, Florin (2006). Southeastern Europe in the Middle Ages, 500–1250. Cambridge University Press. ISBN 978-0-521-89452-4.
- Macartney, C. A. (1953). The Medieval Hungarian Historians: A Critical & Analytical Guide. Cambridge University Press. ISBN 978-0-521-08051-4.
- Szegfű, László (1994). "Gellért, Szent [St Gerard]". In Kristó, Gyula; Engel, Pál; Makk, Ferenc (eds.). Korai magyar történeti lexikon (9–14. század) [Encyclopedia of the Early Hungarian History (9th–14th centuries)] (in Hungarian). Akadémiai Kiadó. p. 231. ISBN 963-05-6722-9.
