= Battle of Pressburg =

907 battle during Hungarian Conquest

- Part of the Hungarian Conquest
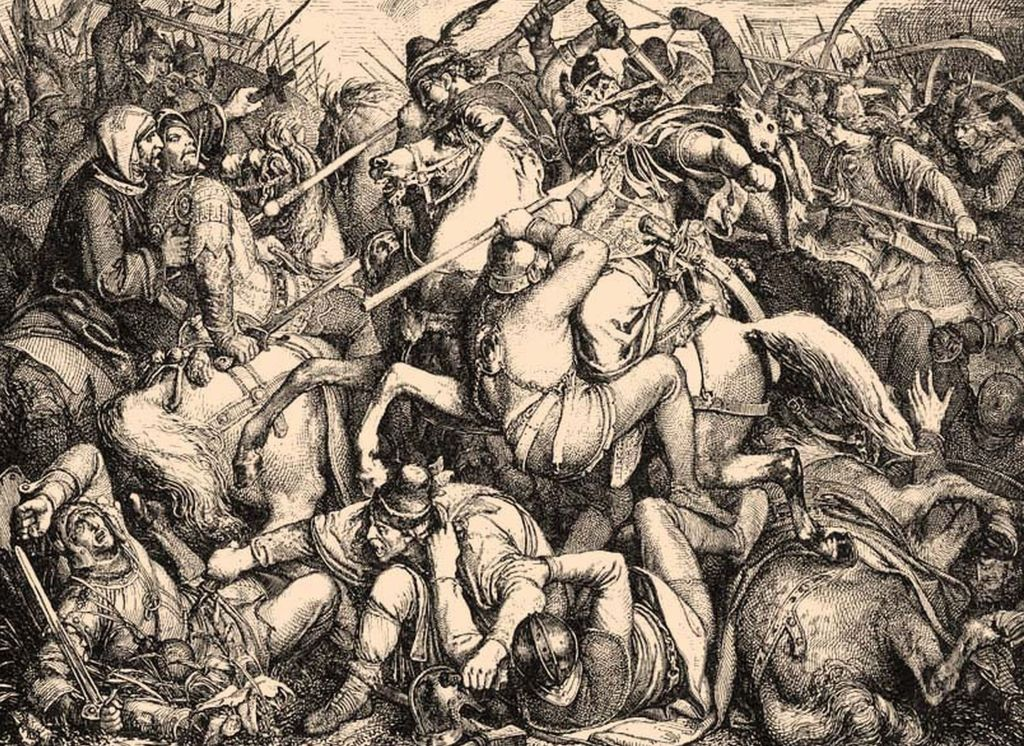
- Peter Johann Nepomuk Geiger: Schlacht bei Pressburg (1850)
Date	4–6 July 907
Location	Brezalauspurc, presumed to be either modern-day Bratislava, Slovakia or Zalavár next to Lake Balaton, Hungary
Result	Hungarian victory

Belligerents
East Francia	Principality of Hungary

Commanders and leaders
Louis the Child; Luitpold, Margrave of Bavaria †; Dietmar I, Archbishop of Salzburg †; Prince Sieghard †	Grand Prince Árpád (?); Unknown Hungarian commander

Casualties and losses
Heavy, among other losses: Prince Luitpold, Margrave of Bavaria, Prince Sieghard, Archbishop Theotmar of Salzburg, 2 bishops, 3 abbots and 19 counts	Not significant

The Battle of Pressburg (German: Schlacht von Pressburg), or Battle of Pozsony (Hungarian: Pozsonyi csata), or Battle of Bratislava (Slovak: bitka pri Bratislave) was a three-day-long battle fought between 4 and 6 July 907, during which the East Francian army, consisting mainly of Bavarian troops led by Margrave Luitpold, was annihilated by Hungarian forces.

The exact location of the battle is not known. Contemporary sources say it took place at "Brezalauspurc", but where exactly Brezalauspurc was remains unclear. Some specialists place it in the vicinity of Zalavár (Mosapurc); others in a location close to Bratislava (Pressburg), the traditional assumption.

An important result of the Battle of Pressburg was that the Kingdom of East Francia could not regain control over the Carolingian March of Pannonia, including the territory of the later Marchia Orientalis (March of Austria), which was lost in 900.

The most significant result of the Battle of Pressburg is that the Hungarians secured the lands they gained during the Hungarian conquest of the Carpathian Basin, prevented a German invasion that jeopardized their future, and established the Kingdom of Hungary. This battle is considered one of the most significant battles in the history of Hungary and marks the conclusion of the Hungarian conquest.

== Sources ==
The Battle of Pressburg is mentioned in several annals, including the Annales iuvavenses, Annales Alamannici, Continuator Reginonis, Annales Augienses, and in the necrologies of important people such as kings, dukes, counts, and spiritual leaders. The most important source for the battle is the 16th-century chronicle of the Bavarian Renaissance humanist, historian, and philologist Johannes Aventinus (Annalium Boiorum VII), (1477–1534), which contains the most comprehensive descriptions. Despite being written 600 years after the events, it is based on manuscripts written at the time of the battle that have since been lost.

== Background ==
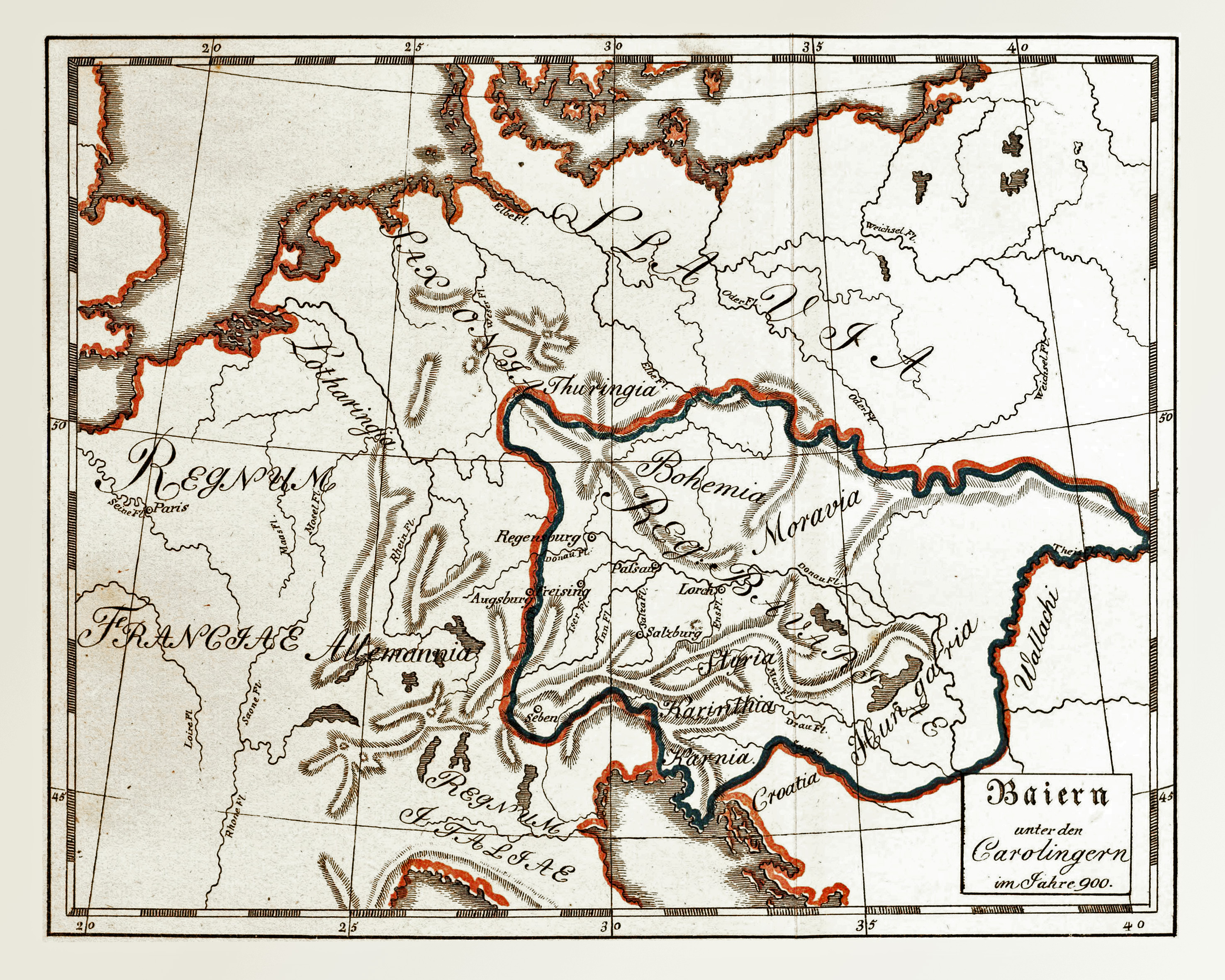
Bavaria and the depending territories (including Moravia) in 900, before the Hungarian conquest

In 900, the advisors to the new king of East Francia, Louis the Child, led by his regent, Hatto I, Archbishop of Mainz, refused to renew the East Francian (German)–Hungarian alliance, which ended upon the death of Arnulf of Carinthia, the prior king. Consequently, in 900, the Hungarians took over Pannonia (Transdanubia) from the Duchy of Bavaria, then a part of East Francia. This started a war between the Hungarians and Germans that lasted until 910. Prior to the Battle of Pressburg (Brezalauspurc), most fighting was between the Hungarians and the Bavarians, with the exception of the Hungarian campaign in Saxony in 906.

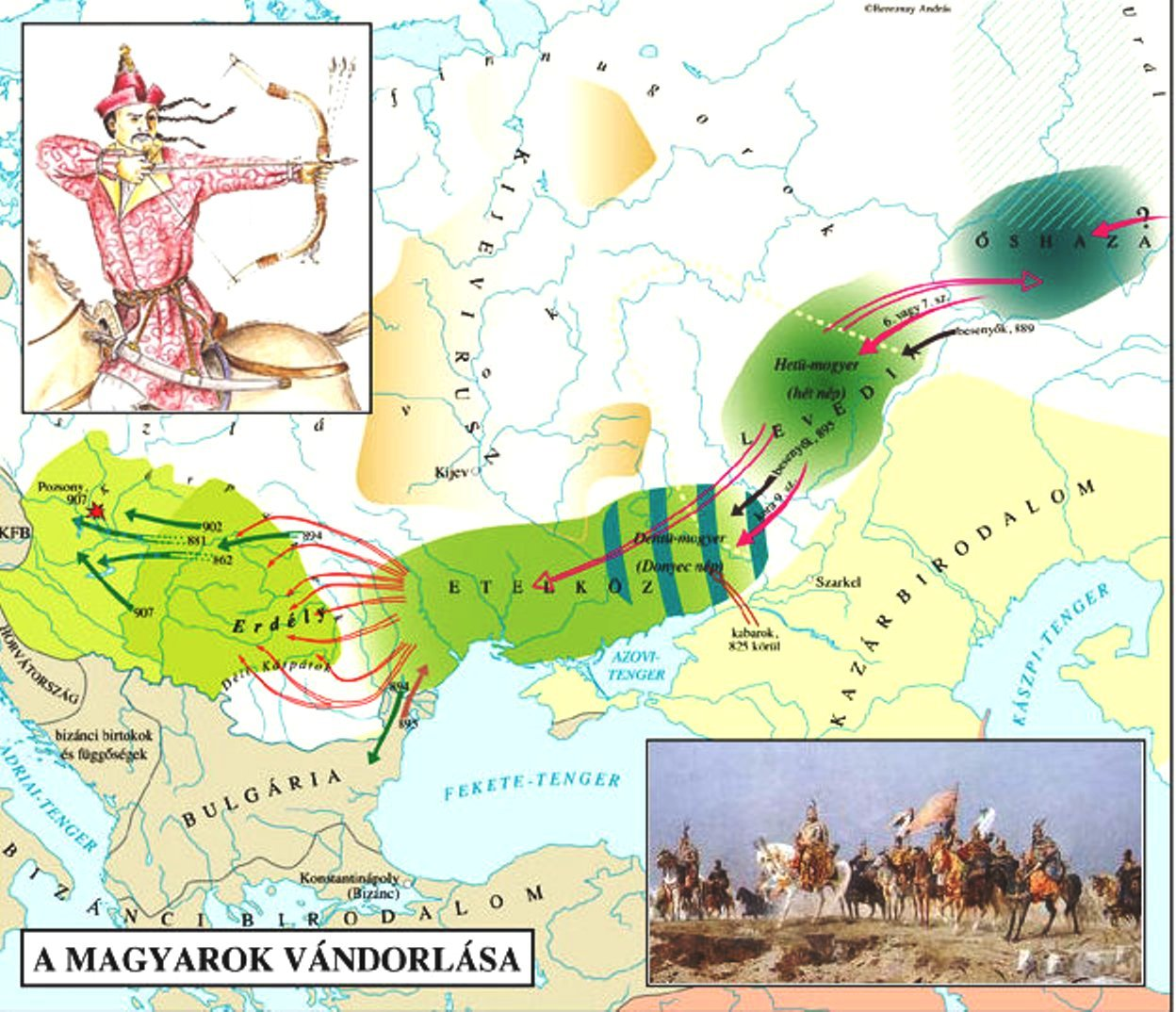
Way of the Hungarian, and conquest of the Carpathian Basin; the Bavarian and Moravian lands, occupied after 900: light green; upper left: authentic image of a Hungarian warrior.

After losing Pannonia, Luitpold, the Margrave of Bavaria, allied with Bavaria's former enemy, Mojmir II of Moravia. In 902, the Hungarian armies, probably led by Kurszán, defeated Great Moravia and occupied its eastern area, followed by Hungarian suzerainty over the rest of Moravia and Dalamancia (territory in the surroundings of Meissen). This interrupted Bavaria's trade routes to Northern and Eastern Europe. This was an economic blow and was one of the reasons that caused Luitpold to believe a campaign against the Hungarians was necessary. He also could not reconcile the loss of Bavarian control over Pannonia, Moravia, and Bohemia.

Several events strengthened Luitpold's resolve to start a campaign against the Hungarians. During the last Hungarian attacks against Bavaria, Luitpold's forces defeated some of their units in minor battles, including Laibach (901) and Fischa River (903). In 904, the Bavarians assassinated Kurszán after feigning a desire for a peace treaty, which they invited him to negotiate. After these setbacks, for a time, the Hungarians did not attack Bavaria. These events and the belief that the Hungarians were afraid of his forces convinced Luitpold that the time was right to expel the Hungarians from the territories formerly belonging to Bavaria.

== Commanders of the armies ==
The nominal leader of the Bavarian army was Louis the Child, the King of East Francia. Since he was under the age of majority, the actual commander was Luitpold. An experienced military leader, Luitpold successfully fought the Moravians and achieved some military success against raiding Hungarian units, but lost the March of Pannonia to them.

Many historians believe the commander of the Hungarian forces was Árpád, Grand Prince of the Hungarians, but there is no proof of this. It is more likely they were led by the same unknown but brilliant commander who led them during the battles of Brenta, Eisenach, Rednitz, and Augsburg. These battles, part of the Hungarian invasions of Europe, were their greatest triumphs, and they inflicted the heaviest losses on enemy forces, including, in most cases, the enemy commander. This conclusion is supported by an analysis of these battles using existing sources. In these cases, the following principles of warfare were used with great success:

- Psychological warfare, for example, involves terrorizing and demoralizing the enemy with constant attacks, inflating the enemy's confidence and lowering his vigilance with deceptive maneuvers or false negotiations, then striking and destroying him by surprise attack (Battle of Brenta, Battle of Augsburg in 910, Battle of Rednitz);
- Feigned retreat (Battle of Brenta, Battle of Augsburg in 910)
- Effective use of military intelligence, preventing surprise attacks and attacking before the German forces could combine (Battle of Augsburg in 910);
- Rapid deployment and movement of units, surprising enemy troops (Battle of Augsburg in 910)
- Covertly crossing geographical obstacles thought by the enemy to be impassable, then attacking unexpectedly (the Danube in 907, the River Brenta in 899, the Adriatic Sea to reach Venice in 900);
- Using nomadic battlefield tactics such as feigned retreat, swarming, hiding troops on the battlefield, and ambushing the enemy emphasis on surprise attacks; dispersing units and then concentrating them at vital points; fluid, ever-changing battle formations; exploiting the superior mobility of cavalry; the predominance of horse archers;
- Extraordinary patience to wait days or even weeks for the right moment to engage the enemy and win the battle (Battle of Brenta, Battle of Augsburg in 910);
- Maintain superlative discipline among one's own troops in respecting and perfectly executing orders;
- Targeting and killing the enemy commander (Pressburg, Eisenach, Augsburg, Rednitz.) This was a tactic also used by the Mongols, weakening the enemy by "cutting his head off", and was also psychologically effective in causing surviving enemy leaders to be afraid of fighting them again.

While the Hungarians won many battles against European forces after 910 (915: Eresburg; 919: Püchen, somewhere in Lombardy; 921: Brescia; 926: somewhere in Alsace; 934: W.l.n.d.r.; 937: Orléans; 940: Rome; 949), they killed the enemy commander in only one battle, the Battle of Orléans (937), where Ebbon of Châteauroux was wounded and died after the battle. Despite this feat, some historians claim the Hungarians lost this battle. After 933, it became clear that the Hungarians no longer had a great, unnamed commander. They made serious mistakes, which resulted in defeats, such as the Battle of Riade, when the Hungarians did not learn of Henry the Fowler's military reforms, only finding out in the course of the battle, which was too late. Another example that shows how the previous leadership was lacking is the Battle of Lechfeld (955). The Hungarian commanders, Bulcsú and Lél, did not maintain discipline and order. Thinking they had won the battle, soldiers plundered the German army's supply caravan without noticing the counter-attack led by Duke Conrad, showing that Bulcsú and Lél catastrophically misjudged the course of the battle. After the successful counterattack resulted in their defeat, the commanders could not prevent their troops from fleeing and dispersing. The German troops and inhabitants captured the fleeing Hungarian troops and executed them by hanging them in Regensburg. These defeats were caused by the loss of military discipline and the Hungarian commanders' lack of authority and competence. The commanders resorted to draconian measures to motivate the soldiers to fight; for example, during the Siege of Augsburg in 955, the Hungarian warriors were driven to attack the walls with scourges.

== Prelude ==
In 907, Luitpold called for the creation of a large Bavarian-German army (Heerbann) from all over Bavaria, which concentrated around Ennsburg. He hoped to score a decisive victory against the Hungarians, who had formed an important principality in the Pannonian Basin. Based on Aventinus' chronicle, the Bavarian political, military, and clergy gathered on June 15, 907, at Ennsburg to plan the campaign, concluding that "the Hungarians must to be eliminated from Bavaria". At this time, Bavaria included Pannonia, Ostmark, east from the river Enns, and probably the old lands of the Great Moravia (now the western part of Slovakia). According to some historians, Bavaria possibly included the area between the Danube and the Tisza rivers, territories that belonged to or depended on Bavaria prior to the Hungarian conquest in 900, meaning the Western region of the Pannonian Basin. This shows the crucial importance of this campaign for the Hungarians.

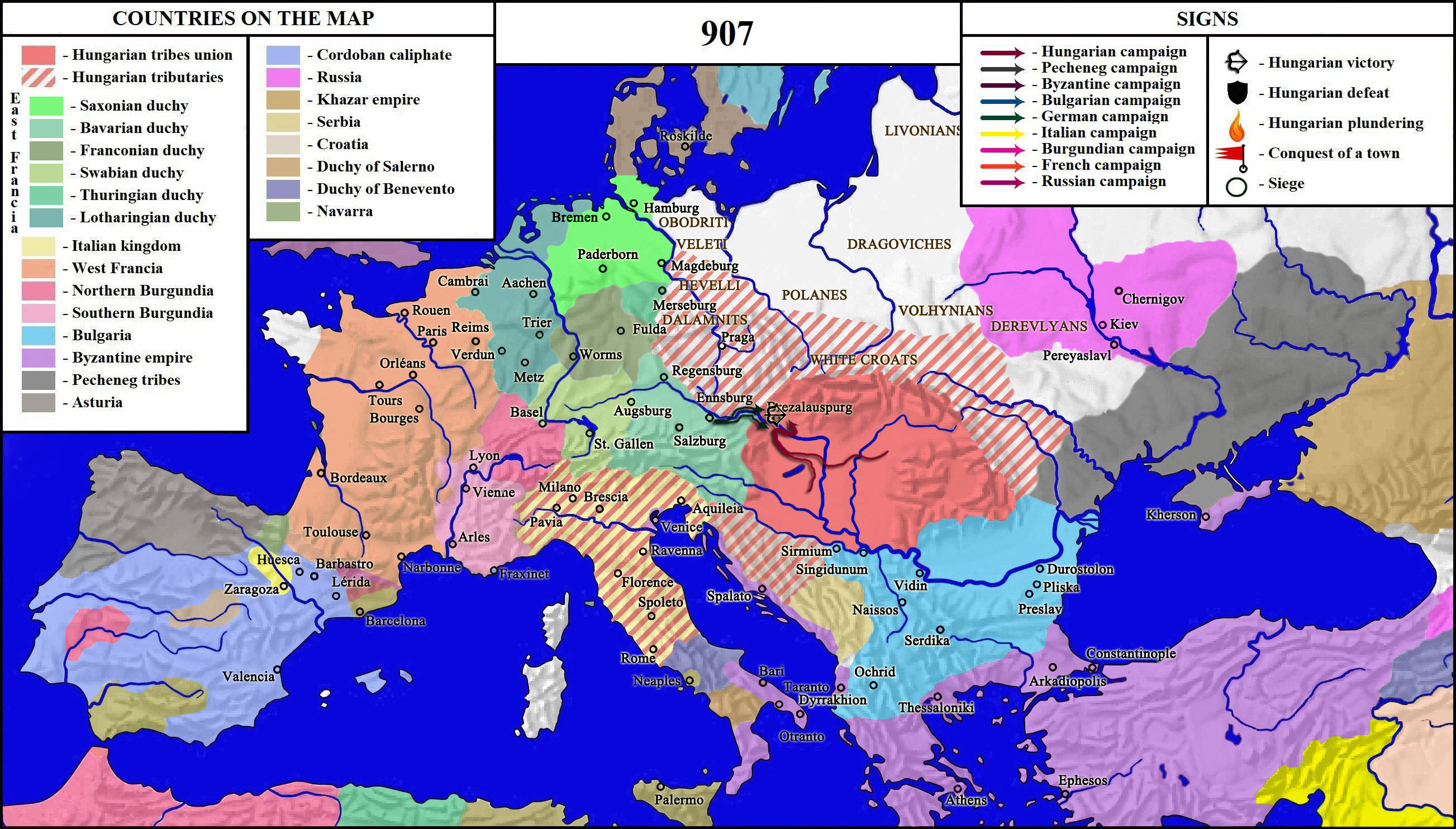
The Bavarian campaign against Hungary and the Battle of Pressburg

Louis the Child and his advisers hoped that the campaign would be a repeat of Charlemagne's success against the Avars in 803, in which the Frankish Empire gained control over the western parts of the Avar Khaganate. The de facto commander, Margrave Luitpold, let him accompany them as far as the St. Florian Monastery, located between the rivers Enns and Traun, on the border between Bavaria and the Principality of Hungary. The king remained at the monastery during the campaign, showing confidence in a victory over the Hungarians.

Contemporary German sources state the Bavarian leaders had great conceit and presumption, probably due to killing Kurszán in 904 and their minor victories. The Hungarians likely used this to their advantage. For example, they might have fueled this overconfidence by deceiving the Bavarians into believing they were in an unfavorable situation and therefore believing the time was right to remove the Hungarians. While there is no hard evidence of this, it is consistent with their known use of this tactic in other battles from the same period, notably in the Battle of Brenta. This is also evidenced by how the German army, in addition to political and military leaders (Prince Sieghard, a number of counts; among them were Meginward, Adalbert, Hatto, Ratold, and Isangrim), brought some of the most influential clergy members from East Francia (Dietmar I, Archbishop of Salzburg, the Chancellor of the Realm; Zacharias, Bishop of Säben-Brixen; and Utto, Bishop of Freising), along with a large number of priests. The Germans must have had such confidence in a complete victory over the Hungarians, followed by their total subjugation, that they thought it would be a simple matter to restore Christianity and the churches, cathedrals, and abbeys the Hungarians destroyed in 900.

That is also proof of the misleading psychological warfare by the Hungarians. Some historians, based on Gesta Hungarorum written by Anonymus, say that the Bavarian attack was caused by the supposed death of Árpád, the Grand Prince of the Hungarians, because the Germans thought that the death of the leader would weaken the Hungarians' capability to fight, but others say that there is no solid evidence that Árpád had died in 907, because all the dates about the period of the Hungarian conquest of the Carpathian Basin, given by Anonymus, are wrong, as historian Gyula Kristó argued. According to historian György Szabados, Árpád might have died in 907 either before or after the battle. However, it is certain that he did not die during the battle because his duties as sacred grand prince, Kende, were only spiritual, preventing him from participating in military or political actions. Anonymus writes that Zoltán, his youngest son, succeeded Árpád as Grand Prince in 907, allowing assumptions that Árpád and his three eldest sons, Tarkacsu, Jelek (or Üllő), and Jutocsa, were killed in the Battle of Pressburg. However, this view is not supported by historiography.

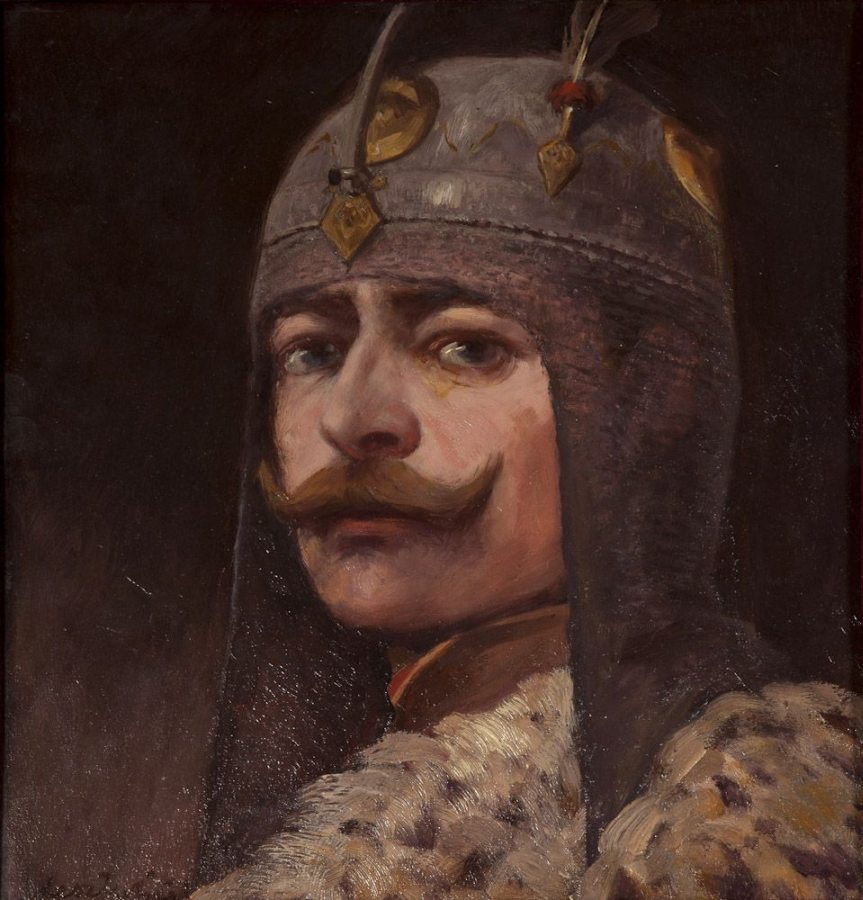
Portrait of Grand Prince Árpád

The German army crossed the Hungarian border on June 17, 907, divided into three groups, and headed east along the Danube. Luitpold led the main force along the northern bank; Dietmar's forces went on the south bank, together with Zacharias, Bishop of Säben-Brixen, and Utto, Bishop of Freising. They marched forward and camped near Brezalauspurg. A fleet under Prince Sieghard and the counts Meginward, Hatto, Ratold, and Isangrim was stationed on the Danube to ensure communication among these groups and to transport food and heavily armored footsoldiers as an auxiliary force to be deployed if one of the Bavarian army corps was attacked. This is similar to the strategy Charlemagne used in his famous campaign against the Avars in 791, where he divided his army in exactly the same way, with troops marching on both sides of the Danube, and a fleet to ensure they remained connected. Luitpold may have thought that copying Charlemagne's strategy against the Avars would ensure victory over the Hungarians. The German commander did not factor in that the Hungarians, in 907, would respond differently from the Avars in 791 by using different war methods and strategies, such as luring the fleet away from the two marching groups, making its mission to keep the two groups in communication impossible. Even though Luitpold's strategy closely followed Charlemagne's successful strategy, the division of the German army into three groups was to prove his biggest mistake. Instead of facing one large army, the Hungarians could concentrate their whole army to attack and defeat each smaller group separately. They did not fear a surprise attack because the Danube prevented the German commanders from sending help to each other, while the Hungarians could cross the river with little difficulty.

Aventinus writes that the Hungarians were aware of the impending Bavarian attack, and they prepared for a very long time. This shows that the Hungarians gathered intelligence about the Bavarian attack even before the army gathered, making it possible for the Hungarian forces to assemble and prepare for the battle. As mentioned before, one of the most important factors in the Hungarian successes in the first decades of the 10th century was their use of military intelligence.

There are no records about the size of the two armies, but the Bavarians were so confident in their superior numbers that they split their army into three groups, implying that they thought each of the three groups was bigger than the whole of the Hungarian army. While the size of the Hungarian army is unknown, it is possible to infer it. The Persian geographer Ahmad ibn Rustah, writing between 903 and 920, states it was known the Hungarian ruler had 20,000 soldiers. According to Hungarian historians, this might actually refer to the number of all available warriors in the Principality of Hungary at the time. The Byzantine Emperor, Constantine VII (the Purple-Born), writes in De Administrando Imperio that the Hungarian tribes had an agreement that in the case of a foreign attack against one tribe, all eight tribes must fight the enemy together. It is likely the majority of the Hungarian warriors, from all the tribes, gathered to fight the Bavarians, making the size of their army around 20,000 soldiers.

== Battle ==
Contemporary European sources give little detail of the battle, only that it occurred and the Bavarian army was annihilated, but they are silent about the sequence of events, the fights, and the skirmishes that led to the battle's conclusion. The Bavarian Renaissance humanist, historian, and philologist Johannes Aventinus (1477–1534), 600 years after the events, in his work Annals of the Bavarians (Annalium Boiorum, volume VII), basing on documents and chronicles from the 10th century that no longer survive, wrote a fairly detailed description of the battle.

Since the Hungarians knew about the attack well before the German army advanced, they probably evacuated all the inhabitants from the march areas, called gyepű in Hungarian, between the rivers Enns and Pressburg to the east. As the Hungarians were still nomadic, it was much easier to accomplish this than in a settled society. They took livestock with them and destroyed food they could not take, thus using the scorched earth tactic, which denied the enemy anything useful. This tactic was used very often by nomadic states and tribes, even in ancient times. For example, the Scythians against Darius I and Alexander the Great, or the Avars against Charlemagne, and more than 100 years after the Battle of Pressburg (1030), Hungary's first king, Stephen I, defeated the invasion of the German Emperor Conrad II using scorched earth, causing famine among the enemy soldiers. In the same way, King Andrew I of Hungary defeated another German invasion led by Emperor Henry III in 1051 using the same scorched earth tactic. Even after the establishment of the Christian and feudal state of Hungary, the principles of nomadic warfare were still used as an effective way to defeat huge imperial armies.

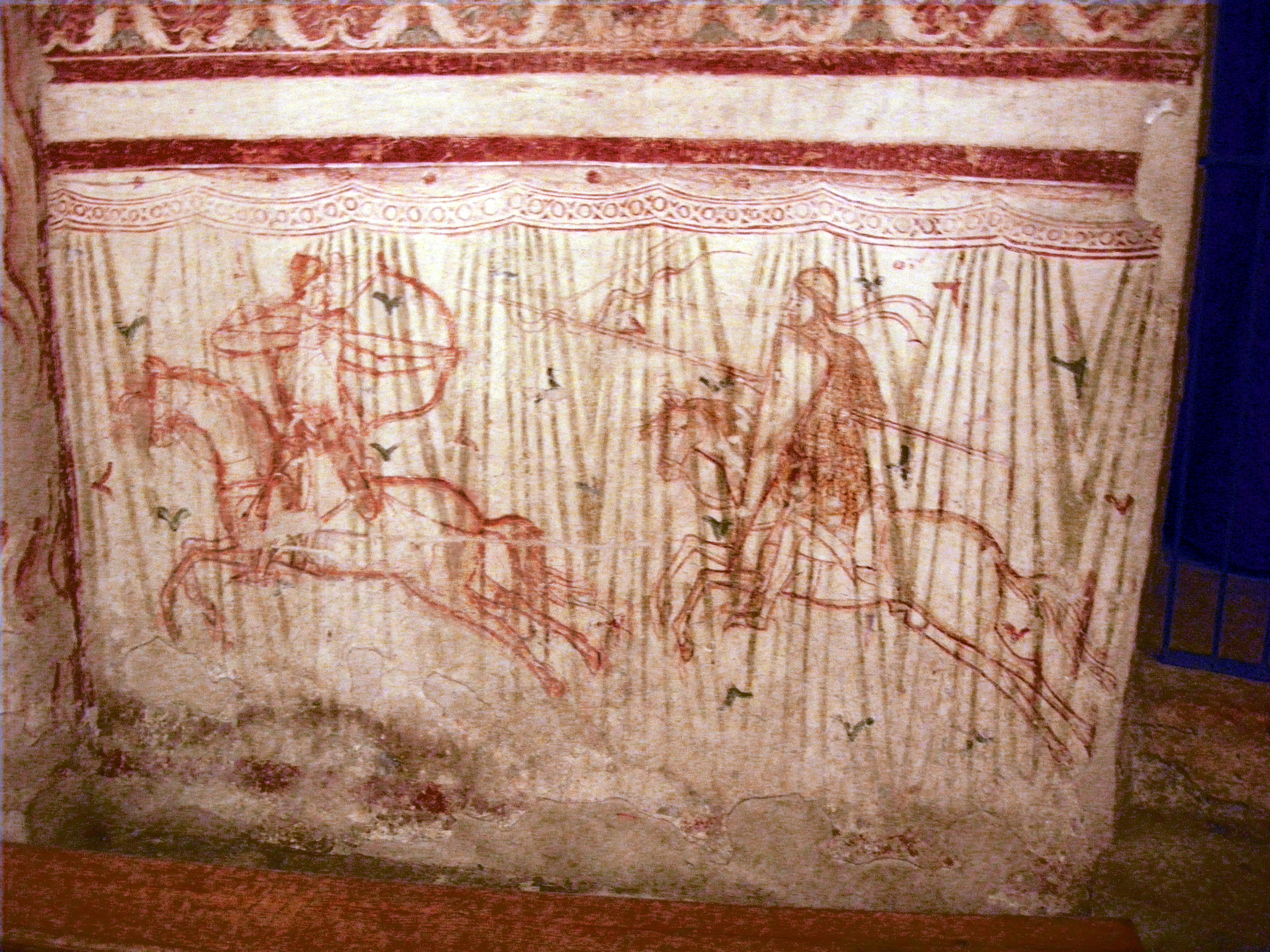
Hungarian mounted archer shooting a knight who chases him, Basilica of Aquileia, 12. century

Aventinus wrote that after the German army crossed the Hungarian border, the Hungarian commanders sent small, lightly armored, mounted archer formations to disrupt the German communications lines, kill their envoys to each other, and harass the army groups. This put the Germans under constant pressure and in a continual state of combat readiness, causing fatigue and demoralization, which then lured them into battle. It is likely that when the Hungarian archers attacked, the Bavarians gave chase, but they rode away unharmed on their horses, since unlike the Bavarians, they were much faster due to having very little or no armor and no weapons other than bows and arrows, no other weapons (although some troops who fought in hand-to-hand combat in the main parts of the battle were much better equipped, so heavier, with curved sabre, lance, battle axe, mace, mail, lamellar armor), The pursuing Bavarian cavalry was heavily armored, and this slowed them significantly. The constant harassment by the Hungarian mounted archers slowed the movement of the Bavarian army even more, forcing them to stop to defend themselves, thus demoralizing them prior to battle. This is why it took the Germans 18 days (between June 17 and July 4) to cover 246 km from Ennsburg to Pressburg, an average of 14 km per day. This delaying tactic made it possible for the Hungarians to pick where and when the battle would be fought. They concentrated their troops near Pressburg because of its favorable conditions for a nomadic army.

The Hungarians continued to harass the Germans as they marched east, which distracted them from the main attack by the bulk of the Hungarian army. The attack started on July 4, concentrated on the southern shore of the Danube, and attacked the southern army group led by Archbishop Dietmar.

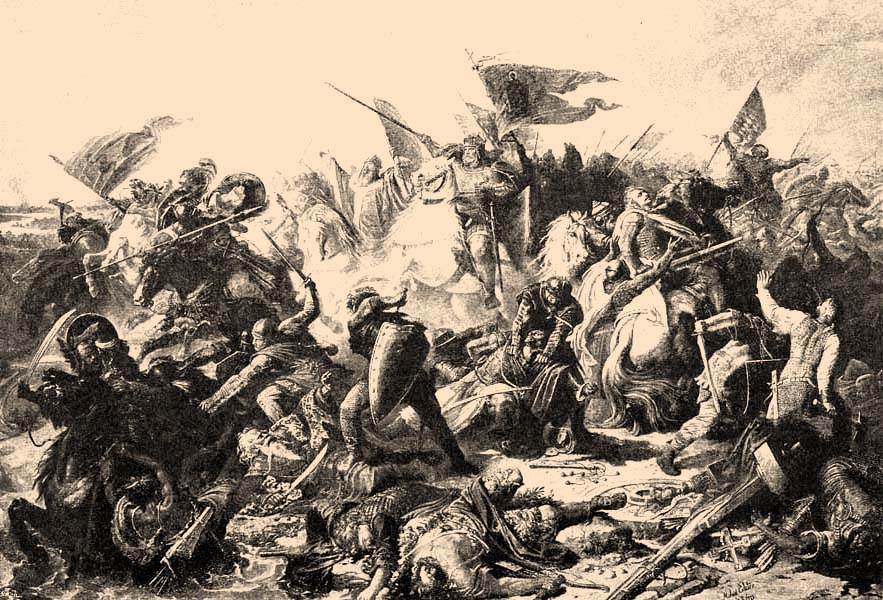
Peter Johann Nepomuk Geiger: Luitpold's last stand

The attack started with the Hungarian archers riding towards the troops led by the archbishop, shooting a "shower of arrows" from their "horn bows" (corneis arcubus, which refers to the famous composite bows of the nomadic Hungarians, made of wood, bone, and horn) at the moving German army group. Taken totally by surprise, the Germans retreated. Even when the Germans were able to enter into battle order, the Hungarians repeated these attacks. They seemed to appear from nowhere, employing terrain, river beds, woods, hills, and other places where they could hide out of sight of the Germans. They shot their arrows from a distance at the Bavarians, then suddenly disappeared. They attacked again, then retreated, shooting arrows and throwing lances at the pursuers, but when the Bavarian cavalry started to chase them, they suddenly dispersed, galloped away from their enemies eyesight, then, after regrouping, suddenly turned and attacked again, surprising the Germans and causing them many losses.

The famous nomadic battle tactic of the feigned retreat is easily recognizable. During this battle, the Hungarians applied every specific military maneuver of the nomadic armies, as presented very well by the Byzantine emperor Leo VI the Wise in his work Tactica: "[The Hungarians] love mostly to fight from a distance, to lay in ambush, to encircle the enemy, to feign retreat and to turn back, to use dispersing military maneuvers." As Aventinus points out, the Hungarians used many tricks, fast movements, sudden attacks, and disappearances from the battlefield, and these totally confused the enemy commanders, who did not know what to do and did not understand which was a decisive attack or which was just a bluff. As a result, the Germans were demoralized, the unity had been loosened in the army's actions, and their battle order was compromised. In the end, when the decisive moment came, when, thanks to the relentless Hungarian attacks and misleading tactics and psychological warfare, the battle order and the control of the commanders were totally lost and the soldiers were completely demoralized, tired, and losing any hope, the Hungarians suddenly attacked them from front, back, and sides, encircling and annihilating the southern corps led by Archbishop Dietmar. From this description, one can suppose that the decisive moment of the first day of the battle was when the Hungarians, with the tactic of the feigned retreat, lured the army corps of Dietmar into a trap, which had to be a place that was near a wood, a river bed, or an accidented terrain, where a part of the Hungarian units were hidden, and when the German soldiers arrived there, chasing the feignly fleeing Magyar army, they suddenly came out, attacked from the back and sides the Germans, and together with the main army, which turned back, encircled and annihilated Dietmar's forces. This was preceded by those attacks and retreats of the Hungarian archer troops, about which Aventinus writes, which resulted in loosening the enemies endurance, and fighting spirit and inflicting on them desperation and uncertainty about what to do, which later eased their decision to attack with disintegrated battle order, which brought their destruction. All this time, it seems that Luitpold, whose army was on the northern bank of the Danube, was unable to help Dietmar's forces because he could not pass the river. Although the fleet under the command of Prince Sieghard was still there, it is not known why this did not happen. Perhaps the fleet, for an unknown reason, moved apart from the proximity of the land forces, and this moment was used by the Hungarian army to attack and destroy the southern army corps led by the archbishop. Nevertheless, this first day of the battle brought with it the slaughter of the southern corps of the attacking army, including Archbishop Dietmar, the bishops Utto of Freising and Zachariah of Säben-Brixen, and the abbots Gumpold, Hartwich, and Heimprecht.

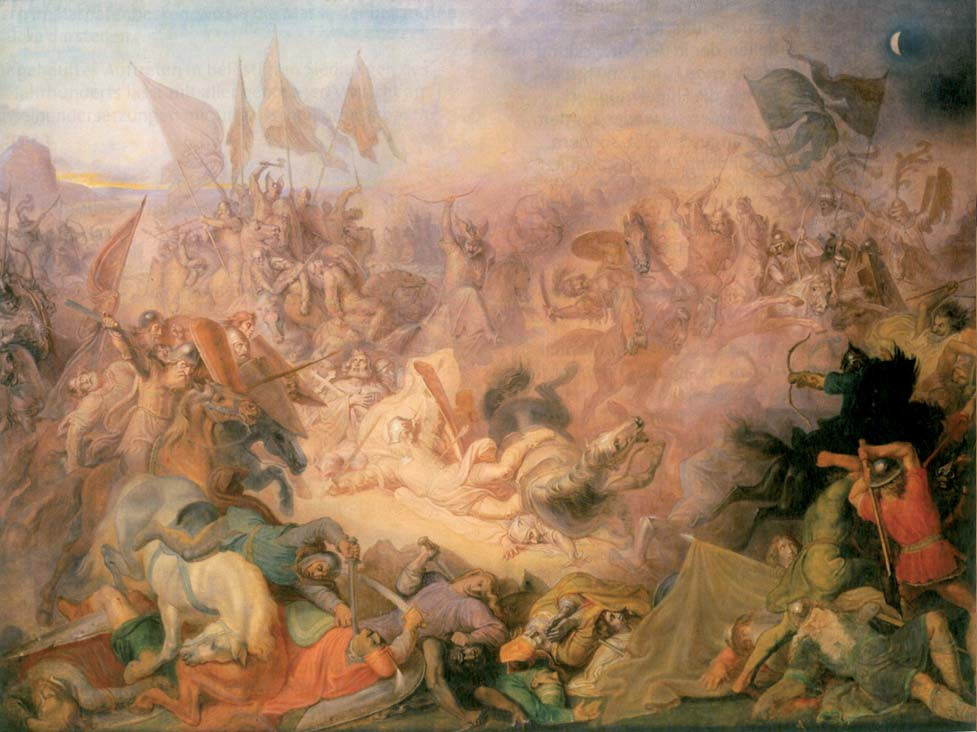
Wilhelm Lindenschmit the Elder: Death of Luitpold in the Battle of Pressburg 907

That night, the Hungarian army covertly crossed the Danube and attacked the forces of Luitpold in their camp while they slept. This is very similar to the Battle of the River Brenta in 899, where the enemy thought he was safe since the river would prevent the Hungarians from crossing, only to find himself terribly mistaken. The Hungarians did cross the River Brenta and took the unsuspecting enemy totally by surprise. The Hungarians used animal skins (goat, sheep, and possibly cattle) tied up to form something like a huge bota bag, filled it with air, and tied on their horses sides, which helped the warrior and his horse to float in order to cross rivers or even the seas like the Adriatic Sea, as they did in 900, to attack Venice. The attack took the Germans by surprise, with the Hungarians' arrows killing many of them, some of them likely in their sleep. The Hungarians probably completely encircled the fortified camp, preventing the Germans from escaping and forming their battle formations, or simply to flee (however, those who managed to break out of the camp were killed by the Hungarians), transforming their camp into a death trap (in the same way as 300 years after that, in 1241, the nomadic Mongols did with the now sedentary Hungarians in the Battle of Mohi), making them totally defenseless, and shooting a rain of arrows on them relentlessly, until they killed everybody. This Western army group, because of its false sense of security, seems not to have paid very little attention to guarding the camp. It had no chance; almost all the soldiers, together with Luitpold, the Master of the Stewards, Isangrim, and the other 15 commanders, were massacred. The fact that the Hungarians could take the sleeping East Francian army by surprise and that this attack was so successful shows that maybe Luitpold had no knowledge of the defeat of Archbishop Dietmar's forces, and this shows that his army was pretty far from the first battlefield (according to the newest opinions, when the battle from the first day occurred, the two Bavarian army corps were one day distance from each other, due to the fact that the main engagements of the battle occurred on consecutive days), because if he had known what happened to the southern army, he would have paid more attention to the guard, preventing such a surprise. Probably the light Hungarian cavalries lured the southern and northern Bavarian forces so away from each other that from there it was impossible for one group to learn what happened to the other (the same thing happened also on the First Battle of Augsburg, when the Hungarians lured the German cavalry away from the infantry and annihilated it without the infantry having any knowledge).

The next day, the Hungarians attacked the German fleet under Prince Sieghard. Aventinus writes nothing about how they managed to attack the fleet, and he points only to the ease of the Hungarian victory and the paralyzing terror of the Germans, who could do nothing to defend themselves. Although there is nothing known about how the Hungarians accomplished this difficult task - destroying the Bavarian fleet - easy, it can be outlined that they did it in the following way: the Magyar army, aligning on both the shores of the Danube, shot burning arrows on the ships, setting them on fire, like they did so many times during the period of the Hungarian invasions of Europe, when the Magyars set many cities on fire by shooting, from great distance, burning arrows on the roofs of the houses behind the city walls, like they did with the towns of Bremen (915), Basel (917), Verdun (921), Pavia (924), and Cambrai (954). Setting wooden ships on fire was no harder than burning down towns using flaming arrows. The distance of the ships floating on the Danube was also not an impediment to them. The width of the Danube at Pressburg is between 180 and 300 meters, but the range of the arrows shot from the nomadic composite bows could reach the extraordinary distance of 500 meters, so there is no doubt that the Hungarian arrows could reach the ships, which, if they were in the middle of the river, would have been only 90 to 150 meters from the shore. Maybe the fire started on the ships by the arrows caused the terror and panic among the Bavarians, about which Aventinus writes, who initially thought that they were safe. We can presume that those Bavarians who wanted to escape from the burning ships jumped in the water, and a part of them drowned, and those who arrived at the shore were killed by the Hungarians. As a result, the majority of the Bavarians from the ships, together with their commanders, Prince Sieghard, counts Meginward, Hatto, Ratold, and Isangrim, died on the last day of the battle.

The three days of the battle brought an almost incredible number of casualties among the German army, including the majority of the soldiers together with their commanders: Prince Luitpold, Archbishop Dietmar, Prince Sieghard, Bishop Utto of Freising, Bishop Zachariah of Säben-Brixen, 19 counts, and three abbots. Among many other contemporary documents, Annales Alamannici (Swabian Annals) writes: "Unexpected war of the Bavarians with the Hungarians, duke Luitpold and their [his peoples] superstitious haughtiness was crushed, [just] a few Christians escaped, the majority of the bishops and counts were killed." There are no accounts of the Hungarian casualties of the battle because the German chronicles, annals, and necrologues, which are the only sources, say nothing about this. Despite this, some modern Hungarian authors think Árpád and his sons died in this battle, but this is only an attempt to romanticize and mythicize historical events by presenting the hero of the Hungarian Conquest as somebody who also sacrificed his life for his country.

After the news of the defeat came to the king, who stood during the period of the campaign near the Hungarian border, he was brought in haste to the city of Passau, which had huge walls, to escape from the rage of the Hungarian warriors, who immediately after the battle started to chase the fliers and kill everyone in their reach. The Bavarian population rushed to big cities like Passau, Regensburg, Salzburg, or in the Alps mountains in woods and marshes to escape the punitive Hungarian campaign, which devastated Bavaria and occupied new territories in the eastern parts of the duchy, pushing Hungary's borders deep in Bavarian territory over areas west of the Enns river, the former border.

Luitpold's forces, consisting of three battle groups, succumbed to the Eurasian nomad tactics employed by the mounted Hungarian soldiers. In a storm of arrows, a large part of the German army was bottled in, crushed, and destroyed. In this battle, the Hungarians overcame unexpected military challenges for a nomadic army, like fighting against a fleet, and won a great victory. This is why the commander of the Hungarians had to be a military genius who also led them to great victories in the battles of Brenta, Eisenach, Rednitz, and Augsburg.

== Location ==
The precise location of this battle is not known. The only contemporary source mentioning a location of the battle is the Annales iuvavenses maximi (Annals of Salzburg); however, the reliability of these annals is questionable, as they survive only in fragments copied in the 12th century. According to the annals, the battle took place in the vicinity of Brezalauspurc, east of Vienna. Some interpretations claim that Brezalauspurc refers to Braslavespurch, Braslav's fortress at Zalavár ("Mosapurc") near Lake Balaton in Pannonia, while others place Brezalauspurc in modern-day Bratislava.

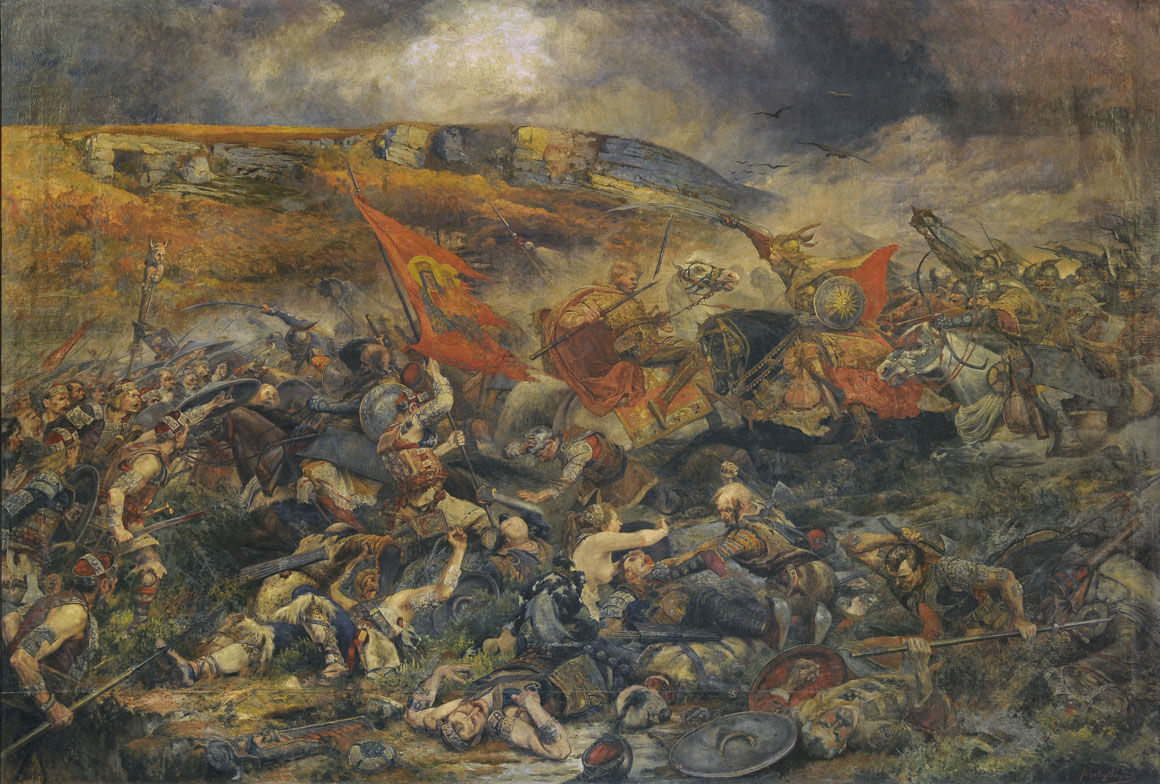
Battle of Bánhida

Many historians have been intrigued by the question of why no Hungarian chronicles (Gesta Hungarorum of Anonymus, Gesta Hunnorum et Hungarorum of Simon of Kéza, Chronicon Pictum, etc.) mention this crucial victory in the history of the Hungarians and why only German annals and chronicles recorded this battle. This is why some historians (mainly in the 19th and the beginning of the 20th centuries) tried to identify the Battle of Pressburg with the Battle of Bánhida, mentioned in the Gesta Hunnorum et Hungarorum by Simon of Kéza, which narrates about a great victory of the Hungarians against the Great Moravian forces led by Svatopluk II, and try to locate the battle at this place.

The majority of the historians, relying on the most detailed account of the battle, Annalium Boiorum VII of Johannes Aventinus, written in the 16th century, which presents the fights on the northern the southern shores of the Danube (Danubium) river and on the river itself, near the city of Vratislavia (Pressburg), involving a Bavarian fleet that came on the Danube, accept the location of the battle in the surroundings of today's city of Bratislava. This is the only place among the locations discussed by the historians as the possible location of the battle, with a river that makes it possible for a fleet of battleships to move. If Zalavár was the place of the battle, that means that the whole description of Aventinus is only an invention. Although Aventinus's account gives so many details (the list of the names of all the German political, military, and spiritual leaders, the nobles who participated and died in the battle, the events that led to the battle, etc.), which can be proven by the sources from the 10th century.

== Aftermath ==
About what happened after the battle, Annalium Boiorum VII narrates that the Hungarian army immediately attacked Bavaria, and the Bavarian army led by Louis the Child was defeated at Ansburg/Anassiburgium (Ennsburg) or Auspurg (Augsburg), and after some days, they defeated another Bavarian army at Lengenfeld, then at the border between Bavaria and Franconia, they won another victory, killing Gebhard, the "king" of Franks, and Burghard, the "tetrarch" of the Thuringians, occupied many cities and monasteries, and made gruesome deeds, destroying churches, killing, and taking hostages thousands of people. However, from the Continuator Reginonis, Annales Alamannici, the contemporary sources with the events, we can understand that the battle of Ennsburg/Augsburg and that from the boundary of Bavaria and Franconia, occurred in reality in 910, as the battles of Augsburg and Rednitz. And Burchard, Duke of Thuringia, died not at Rednitz but in the Battle of Eisenach in 908.

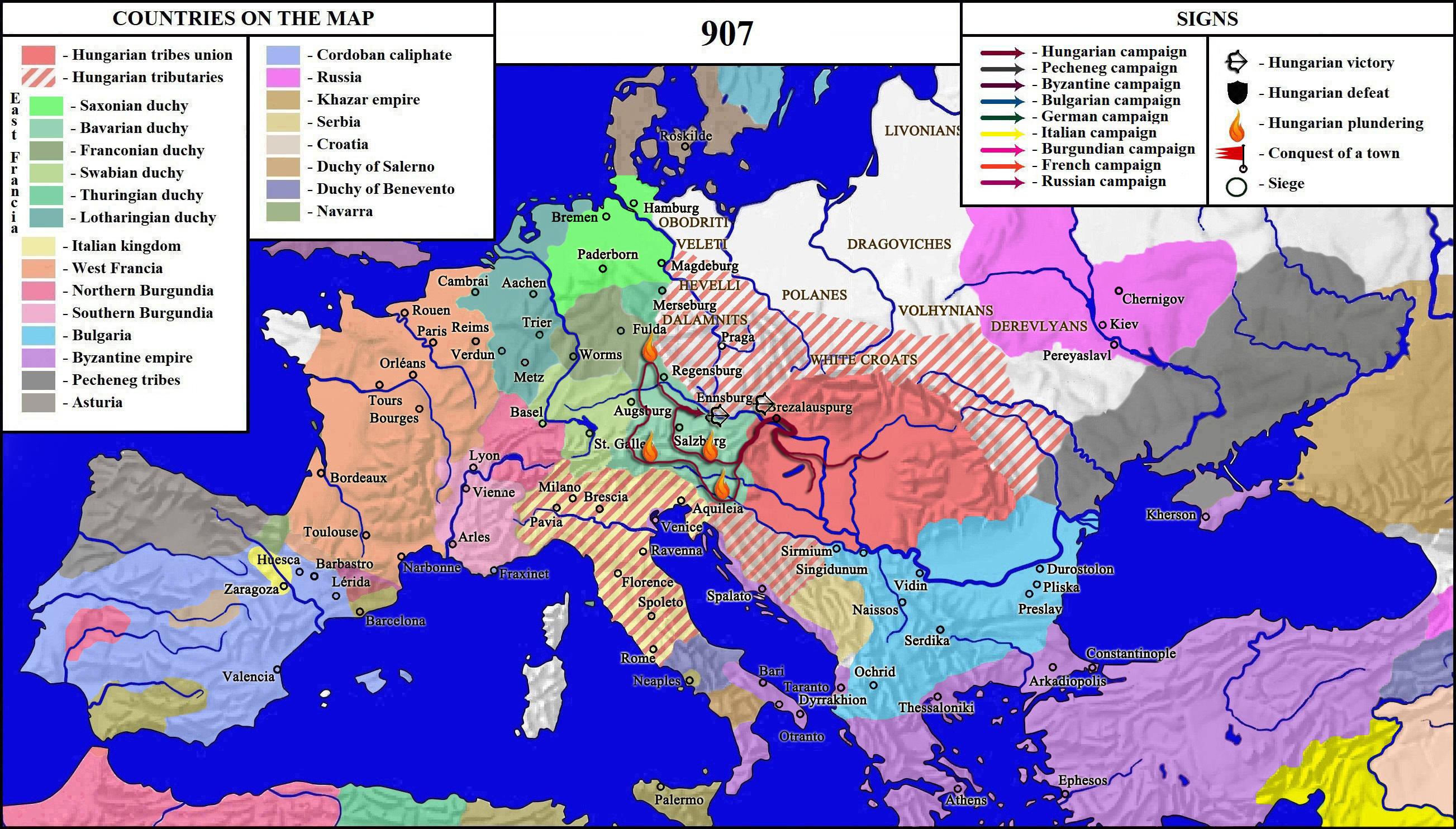
The map showing the Hungarian-East Frankish war of 907

Taking out these events, which obviously did not happen in 907, from Aventinus's text, we can reconstruct the events that occurred immediately after the Battle of Pressburg in the following way: The Hungarians attacked Bavaria immediately after the battle of Pressburg. They entered Bavaria, plundered, and occupied cities and fortresses. They occupied St. Florian Monastery and other places near the Enns River, and the people ran away to cities like Salzburg (Iuvavia), Passau (Bathavia), Regensburg (Reginoburgium), or in the mountains in woods, marshes, or fortresses.

Then Aventinus refers to the fact that in the Hungarian army, women could be warriors too, which fought in the war, believing that they would have in the afterlife as many servants as they would kill in the battle. Traces of woman warriors in the nomadic societies in that period (VIII-X centuries) can be found in Central Asia, and in the legends of the period of the Hungarian invasions of Europe, we can find the belief that the killed enemy will become the slave of his killer in the afterlife in the legend about the Horn of Lehel (Lehel kürtje).

After that, the Hungarians crossed the river Enns, swimming with their horses (amnem equis tranant), in southern Bavaria and plundered the cities and monasteries they found on their way, occupying and burning Schliersee, Kochel, Schlehdorf, Polling, Dießen am Ammersee, Sandau, Thierhaupten, etc. They crossed the Danube at Abach, heading to North, then took prisoners—monks, children, girls, and women—and bound them with animal hair. According to Aventinus, they even occupied and burned Regensburg, the capital city of the Duchy of Bavaria (the city was later strengthened with huge walls wide of 2 and high of 8 meters by the new Bavarian prince Arnulf), and Osterhofen. On the Hungarians way back home, the Bavarians, who wanted to take their spoils away, tried to ambush them at Lengenfeld, at the road that leads to the village, but the Magyars defeated them, put them down, and swept them away.

== Consequences ==
This battle is an excellent example of the advantages associated with light armored, quick-moving nomadic horse archer warfare versus the Central and Western European styles of warfare of the time, as represented by the post-Carolingian Germanic armies, represented by heavy armored, slow-moving cavalry and foot soldiers.

The Hungarian victory shifted the balance of power from the Duchy of Bavaria and the East Francian state in favor of Hungary. The Germans did not attack Hungary for many years. The Hungarian victory forced the new Bavarian prince, Luitpold's son, Arnulf, to conclude a peace treaty, according to which the prince recognized the loss of Pannonia (Transdanubia) and Ostmark, the river Enns as a borderline between the two political entities, paid tribute, and agreed to let the Hungarian armies, which went to war against Germany or other countries in Western Europe, pass through the duchies lands (despite this agreement, Arnulf did not feel safe, strengthened the Bavarian capital, Regensburg, with huge walls, and organized an army that, he hoped, he could defeat the Hungarians, but he never had the courage to turn definitively against them). This brought for the East Francian duchies and West Francia almost 50 years (908–955) of attacks and plunderings, which repeated almost every year, because Bavaria no longer was an impediment to the Hungarian forces.

Although Arnulf concluded peace with the Hungarians, the East Francian king, Louis the Child, continued to hope that he, concentrating all the troops of the duchies of the kingdom (Saxony, Swabia, Franconia, Bavaria, and Lotharingia), would defeat the Hungarians and stop their devastating raids. However, after his defeats in the First Battle of Augsburg and the Battle of Rednitz in 910, he also had to conclude peace and accept paying tribute to them.

The Battle of Pressburg was a major step toward establishing Hungarian military superiority in Southern, Central, and Western Europe, lasting until 933, enabling raids deep into Europe, from Southern Italy, Northern Germany, France, and to the border with Hispania, and collecting tribute from many of the kingdoms and duchies . Although their defeat in the Battle of Riade in 933 ended the Hungarian military superiority in Northern Germany, the Magyars continued their campaigns in Germany, Italy, Western Europe, and even Spain (942) until 955, when a German force at the Second Battle of Lechfeld near Augsburg defeated a Hungarian army, and after the battle executed three captured major Hungarian chieftains (Bulcsú, Lehel, and Súr), putting an end to the Hungarian incursions into territories west of Hungary. The Germans did not follow up this victory: despite being at the height of their unity and power, after defeating the Hungarians, conquering many territories under Otto I in Southern, Eastern and Western Europe, establishing the Holy Roman Empire, they did not see the victory against the Hungarians from 955 as an opportunity to attack Hungary in order to eliminate or subdue it, until the middle of the XI. century (however this time too without success), because they cleverly didn't over-estimate the importance of this battle, calculating the dangers which an expedition in Hungarian territories could create for the invaders, basing on the frightening and painful memory of the Battle of Pressburg.

== Sources ==
- Szőke, Béla Miklós (2021). Die Karolingerzeit in Pannonien. Mainz: Verlag des Römisch-Germanischen Zentralmuseums, ISBN 978-3-88467-308-9, pp. 295–301.
- Torma, Béla Gyula; Veszprémy, László, eds. (2008). Egy elfeledett diadal – A 907. évi pozsonyi csata [A Forgotten Triumph – The Battle of Pressburg in the Year of 907] (PDF) (in Hungarian). Budapest: Honvédelmi Minisztérium Hadtörténeti Intézet és Múzeum (Ministry of Defence Military History Museum). ISBN 978-963-7097-32-4.
