= Grand Prince of the Hungarians =

Contemporary term for the leader of 10th-century tribal Hungary

Grand Prince (Hungarian: Nagyfejedelem) was the title used by contemporary sources to name the leader of the federation of the Hungarian tribes in the tenth century.

The grand prince (Nagyfejedelem) was probably elected by the leaders of the federation of the seven Hungarian tribes and the three Kabar tribes (dissident Khazar tribes) that joined the Hungarians before 830. However, the first grand prince, Álmos, father of Árpád, was more likely appointed by the khagan of the Khazars. It is still under discussion whether the grand prince was the spiritual leader of the federation (kende), the military commander of the Hungarian tribes (gyula) or the title was a new creation.

When the Hungarians were pushed out of Etelköz and moved to the Carpathian Basin (Honfoglalás), the grand prince's power seemed to be decreasing. By the time of Géza, Transylvania had been ruled by a (semi-)independent leader (gyula). Stephen (Vajk) had to conquer not only the territories of the gyula, but also the lands of Ahtum (Ajtony) and the Black Magyars.

The title disappeared on the coronation of Stephen I (Vajk) on 25 December 1000 or 1 January 1001; the Grand Prince of the Hungarians became the King of Hungary.

== Grand princes of the Hungarians ==
- Álmos (c. 850 – c. 895)
- Árpád (c. 895 – c. 907)
- Zolta (c. 907 – c. 950)
- Fajsz (c. 950 – c. 955)
- Taksony (c. 955 – c. 970)
- Géza (c. 970 – 997)
- Stephen / Vajk (997 – 1000, became the first king of the Hungarians)

It is not known exactly how many grand princes of Hungary ruled between the supposed date of Árpád‘s death (c. 907) and when Fajsz ascended to the throne (c. 948), because it seems that the chroniclers of the Hungarian kings, who came from the branch of Solt after 1000, wanted to make the people of the kingdom, to forget the rule between 907 and 950, of the other branches of the Árpád dynasty, coming from the other 3 sons of Árpád: Tarkacsu/Liüntika, Jelek, Jutocsa, who, or their offspring probably ruled Hungary during this period, according to the nomadic custom of agnatic seniority, used by the Hungarian rulers before 1000. The quietness of the chronicles is the reason why today's historians cannot establish precisely the whole list of the Hungarian grand princes between 907 and 955, and the only known rulers are Solt (from the Hungarian chronicles) and Fajsz from the book of the Byzantine emperor Constantine VII, De Administrando Imperio, which preserved a longer list of names from the Árpád-family, than the Hungarian chronicles, preoccupied only with the ruling branch of Solt. The reason of forgetting Fajsz from the Hungarian chronicles was that he was not son of Solt, but of Jutocsa. Without the existence of De Administrando Imperio, very little would be known about him. The De Administrando Imperio preserved the name of Fajsz as the Grand Prince of the Hungarians, because it was written during his reign. But the names of the other grand princes, who were not from the branch of Solt, who probably ruled before and after him, are unknown.

== See also ==
- Principality of Hungary
- List of Hungarian rulers
- King of Hungary

== Sources ==
- Korai Magyar Történeti Lexikon (9-14. század), főszerkesztő: Kristó, Gyula, szerkesztők: Engel, Pál és Makk, Ferenc (Akadémiai Kiadó, Budapest, 1994)
- Kristó, Gyula: A Kárpát-medence és a magyarság régmúltja (1301-ig) (Szegedi Középkortörténeti Könyvtár, Szeged, 1993)
