= Fajsz =

Grand Prince of the Hungarians from c. 950 to c. 955

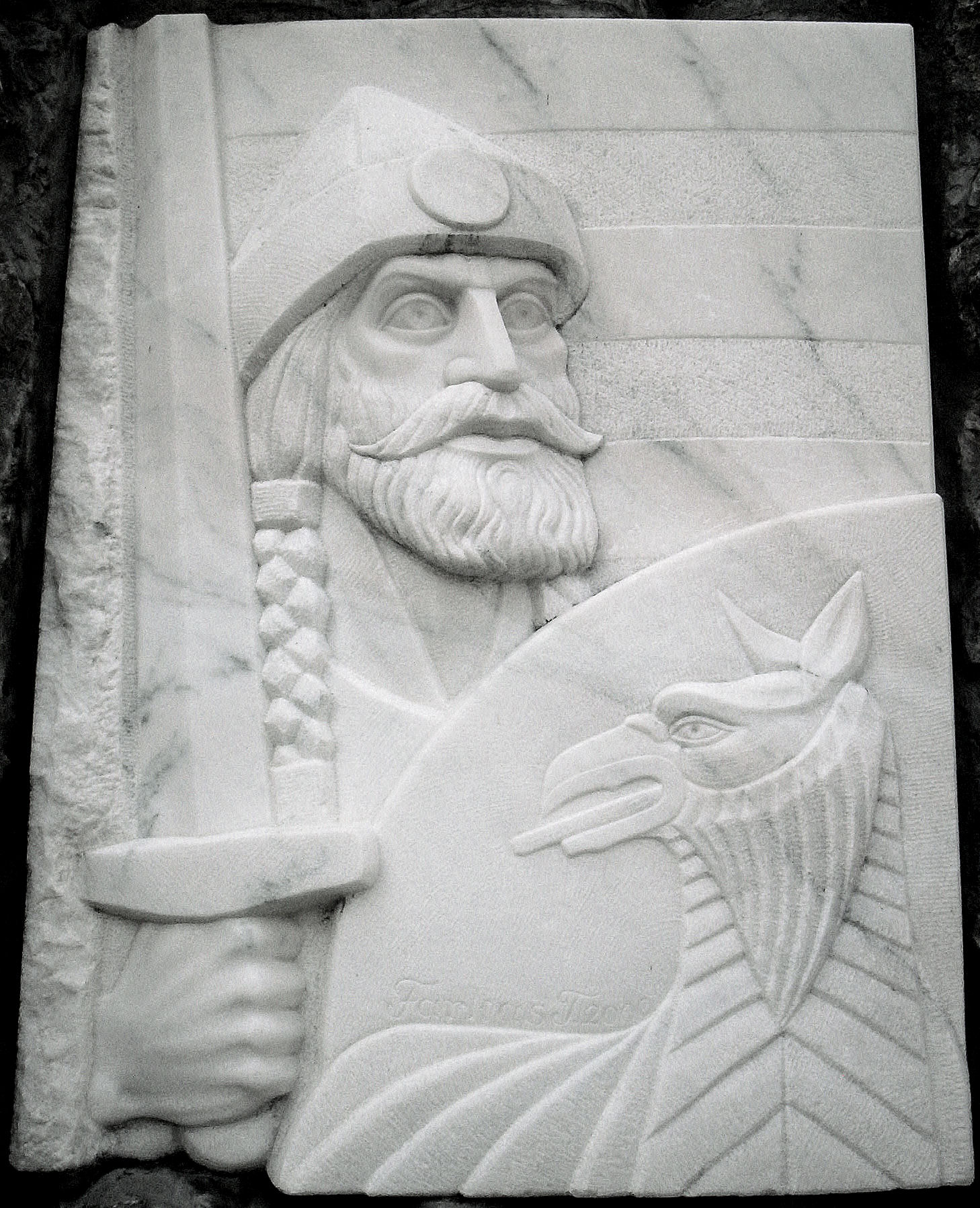
- A relief showing him in Fajsz (Hungary)

Grand Prince of the Hungarians
- Predecessor: Zoltán (debated)
- Successor: Taksony
- Dynasty: Árpád dynasty
- Father: Jutotzas
- Religion: Hungarian paganism

Fajsz (Hungarian: [ˈfɒjs]), also Falicsi ([ˈfɒlit͡ʃi]), was Grand Prince of the Hungarians from about 950 to around 955. All information on him comes from De administrando imperio, a book written by the Byzantine Emperor Constantine VII Porphyrogenitus. No other contemporary source or later Hungarian chronicle preserved his name, suggesting that he did not take an active role in the politics of the Hungarian tribes' confederation.

== Life ==
Fajsz was the only known son of Jutotzas, the third son of Árpád who led the Hungarian tribes' confederation at the time of their conquest of the Carpathian Basin between around 895 and 907. After Árpád's death, fundamental changes happened in the government of the tribal confederation. Although the various tribes could even thereafter act in concert for raids, they did not obey a strong central authority any more.

Even so, as the historian Miklós Molnár emphasizes, "the supremacy of the House of Árpád seems to have remained unshaken." For instance, Hungarian visitors to Constantinople – including Termatzus, a great-grandson of Árpád – informed Emperor Constantine VII around 948 that the "first chief" of the Hungarians "comes by succession of Árpád's family". Constantine VII also mentions that Fajsz was the head of the confederation of the Hungarian tribes around 950. The historian Gyula Kristó proposes that Fajsz abdicated after the Hungarians' catastrophic defeat by the Germans in the battle of Lechfeld in 955.

== Name and legacy ==
Fajsz's name, which was preserved in two forms – "Phalitzi" and "Phalis" – may be connected either to the Hungarian word for "half" (fél) or to the verb fal ("to gobble up"). Historian György Györffy proposes that the villages named Fajsz in the Carpathian Basin – for instance, the one in Bács-Kiskun County (Hungary) – were named after him. Based on the recorded Phalitzi form of Fajsz's name, Gyula Kristó rejects this hypothesis.

== See also ==
- Battle of Lechfeld
- Gyula (title)
- Horka (title)
- Principality of Hungary

== Sources ==
- Constantine Porphyrogenitus: De Administrando Imperio (Greek text edited by Gyula Moravcsik, English translation by Romillyi J. H. Jenkins) (1967). Dumbarton Oaks Center for Byzantine Studies. ISBN 0-88402-021-5.
- Curta, Florin (2006). Southeastern Europe in the Middle Ages, 500-1250. Cambridge University Press. ISBN 978-0-521-89452-4.
- Engel, Pál (2001). The Realm of St Stephen: A History of Medieval Hungary, 895–1526. I.B. Tauris Publishers. ISBN 1-86064-061-3.
- Kordé, Zoltán (1994). "Falitzi". In Kristó, Gyula; Engel, Pál; Makk, Ferenc (eds.). Korai magyar történeti lexikon (9-14. század) [Encyclopedia of the Early Hungarian History (9th-14th centuries)]. Akadémiai Kiadó. p. 207. ISBN 963-05-6722-9.
- Kristó, Gyula; Makk, Ferenc (1996). Az Árpád-ház uralkodói [Rulers of the House of Árpád] (in Hungarian). I.P.C. Könyvek. ISBN 963-7930-97-3.
- Molnár, Miklós (2001). A Concise History of Hungary. Cambridge University Press. ISBN 978-0-521-66736-4.

Fajsz House of Árpád Born: ? Died: ?
Regnal titles
Preceded by Zoltán (?)	Grand Prince of the Hungarians c. 950–c. 955	Succeeded by Taksony
