= Liüntika =

Liüntika/Levente
- Born: ?
- Died: before 907 (or Battle of Pressburg); Pressburg/Pozsony/Bratislava (?)
- Father: Árpád

Liüntika or Levente (? - before 907) was a Hungarian tribal chieftain, the eldest son of Grand Prince Árpád. As a military leader he participated in the Hungarian Conquest (Honfoglalás, "Hometaking").

== Positions ==
According to the state structure of Goktürks and Khazars the Crown Prince reigned over the joined people. This is in line with the sources, where Liüntika appeared as leader of the Kabars. The Kabars was the last ethnic group who joined to the Hungarian people. According to Byzantine Emperor Constantine VII the Purple-born – following the narrative of horka Bulcsú – a leader (archon) ruled the three tribes of the Kabars, even at the time of the Emperor. Constantine viewed that Lüntika was this leader during the Conquest.

== Life ==
Liüntika, with the Kabar people, fought against the First Bulgarian Empire, while his father, Árpád started an offensive with the main army in alliance with the Great Moravian Empire against Pannonia and the Bulgarian border in the Great Hungarian Plain. After the Conquest probably he became leader of Moravia, because there was a Moravian castle near to the firth of Thaya, Břeclav (Lundenburg) appeared as Laventenburch in a source dated 1054.

His uncertain identity was increased by Constantine VII who mentioned him as son of Árpád during the Bulgarian campaigns, but later, when he lists Árpád's descendants, Liüntika is not listed among children of the grand prince. It has also tried to explain that Liüntika/Levente lost his life during the campaign and had no descendants. This seems to contradict the aforementioned place name of Laventenburch. In other opinions his identity is same with one of other four sons, he was identified mostly with the second eldest son, Tarhacsi/Tarkacsu/Tarkatzus/Tarhos. Péter Földes has a special theory for the contradiction: the "árpád" word meant a function, which first used by Grand Prince Álmos, father of Árpád. He gave this name to his first-born child, the prospective heir. According to Földes the two interpretations could then be mixed, Liüntika was son of „Árpád Álmos”, so he could be the younger brother of Grand Prince Árpád, not his son.
