= Jelek (son of Árpád) =

Jelek/Hülek/Üllő
- Died: before 907 (or Battle of Pressburg); Pressburg/Pozsony/Bratislava (?)
- Issue: Ezeleg; Tas
- Father: Árpád

Jelek, Hülek or Üllő (? - before 907) was the third son of Grand Prince Árpád. The name might be related to the Khazar title Ilik/Ilek.
