= Lengenfeld, Austria =

Lengenfeld
- Municipality
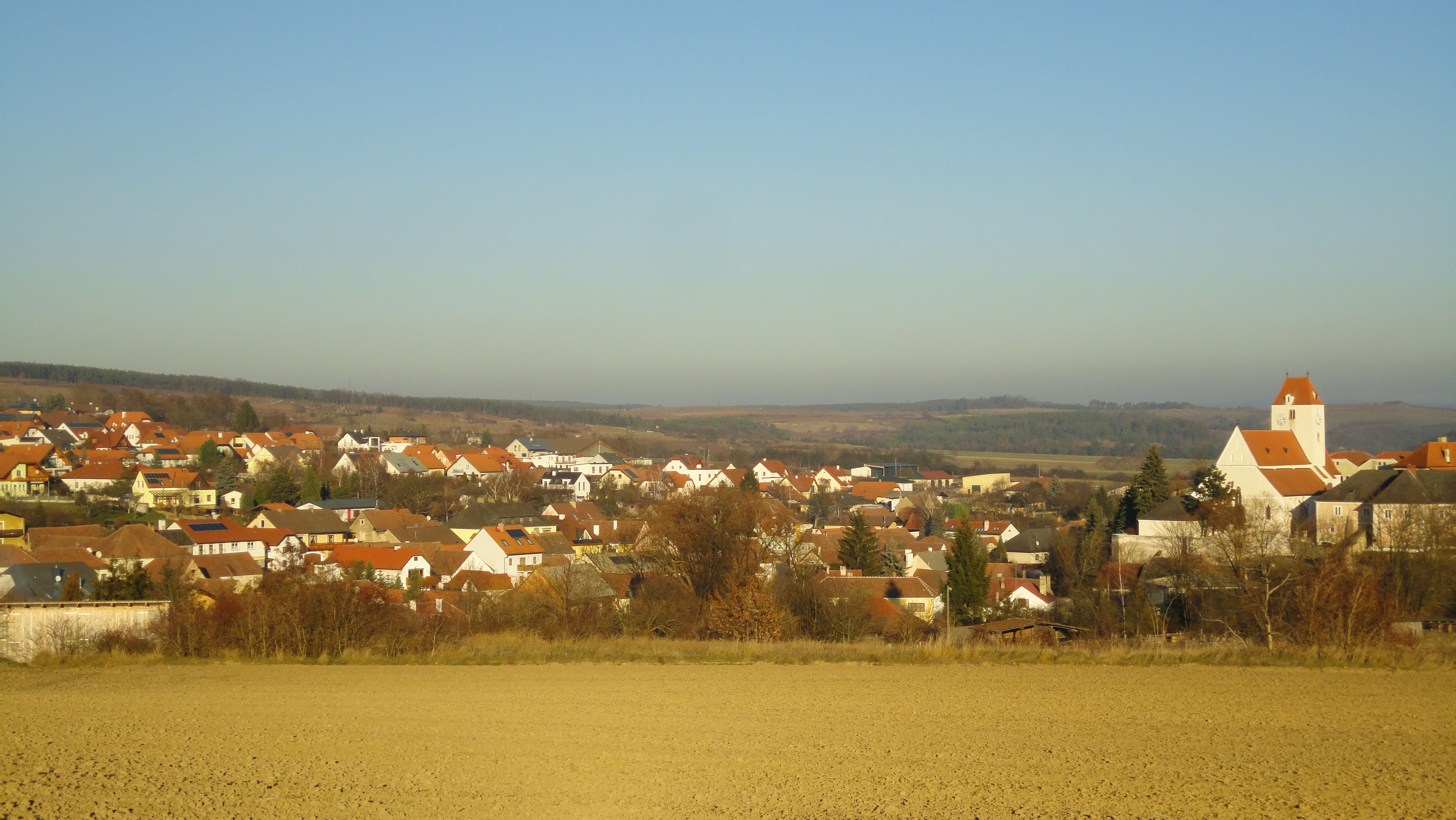
- General view of Lengenfeld

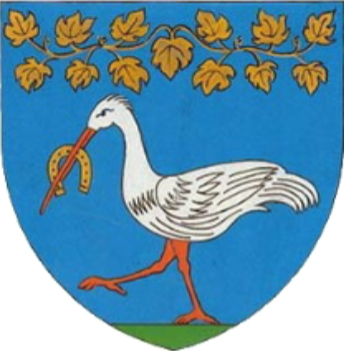
- Coat of arms

- Location within Austria
- Coordinates: 48°28′N 15°35′E
- Country: Austria
- State: Lower Austria
- District: Krems-Land

Government
  - Mayor: Christian Kopetzky (SPÖ)

Area
  - Total: 15.01 km^{2} (5.80 sq mi)
- Elevation: 315 m (1,033 ft)

Population (2018-01-01)
  - Total: 1,412
  - Density: 94.07/km^{2} (243.6/sq mi)
- Time zone: UTC+1 (CET)
  - Summer (DST): UTC+2 (CEST)
- Postal code: 3552
- Area code: 02719
- Website: www.lengenfeld.at

Lengenfeld (German pronunciation: [ˈlɛŋənˌfɛlt]) is a town in the district of Krems-Land in the Austrian state of Lower Austria.

== Population ==
Historical population
Year	Pop.	±%
1971	1,188	—
1981	1,186	−0.2%
1991	1,216	+2.5%
2001	1,373	+12.9%
2011	1,448	+5.5%
2021	1,422	−1.8%
