= Árpád =

Grand Prince of the Hungarians from c. 895 to 907

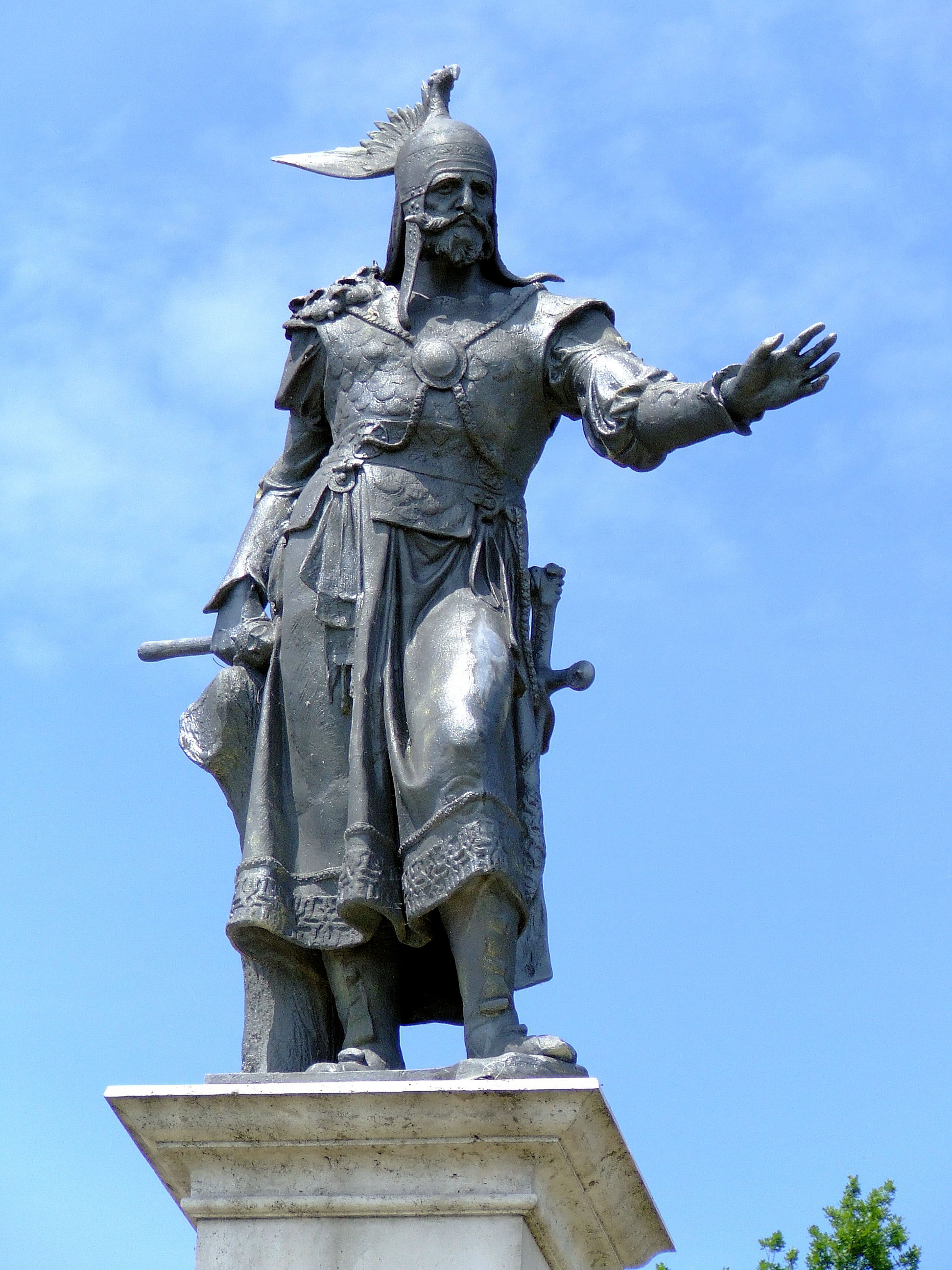
- Statue of Árpád at Ráckeve (Hungary)

Grand Prince of the Hungarians
- Reign: c. 895 – c. 907
- Predecessor: Álmos
- Successor: Zoltán (uncertain)
- Born: c. 845
- Died: c. 907 (aged 62)
- Burial: Fehéregyháza (Hungary) (uncertain)
- Issue: Liüntika; Tarkatzus; Jelek; Jutotzas; Zoltán
- Dynasty: Árpád dynasty
- Father: Álmos
- Religion: Hungarian paganism

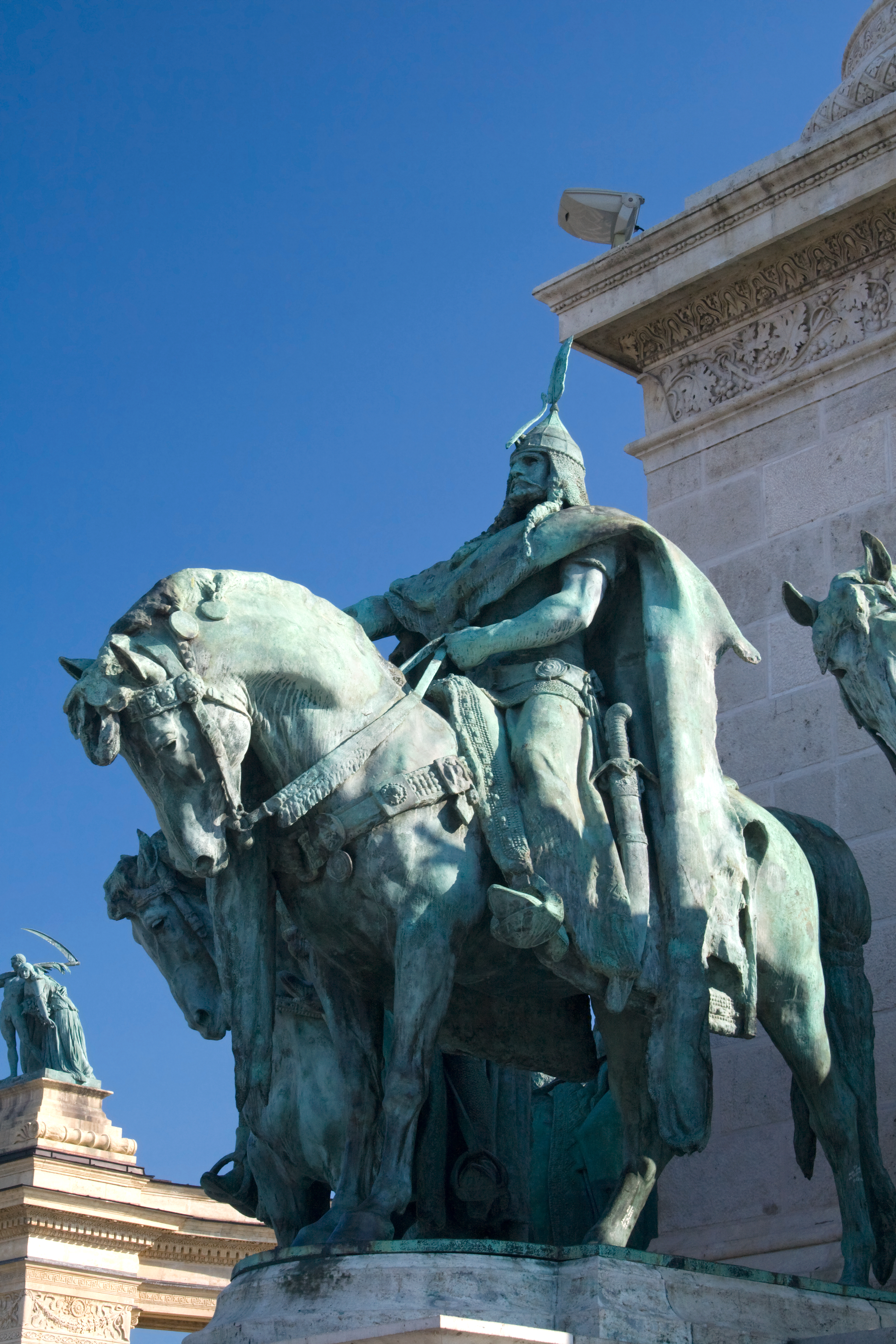
Árpád's statue at the Heroes' Square (Budapest)

Árpád (Hungarian pronunciation: [ˈaːrpaːd]; c. 845 – c. 907) was the head of the confederation of the Magyar tribes at the turn of the 9th and 10th centuries. He might have been either the sacred ruler or kende of the Hungarians, or their military leader or gyula, although most details of his life are debated by historians, because different sources contain contradictory information. Despite this, many Hungarians refer to him as the "founder of our country", and Árpád's preeminent role in the Hungarian conquest of the Carpathian Basin has been emphasized by some later chronicles. The dynasty descending from Árpád ruled the Kingdom of Hungary until 1301.

== Biography ==
=== Early life ===
Árpád was the son of Álmos who is mentioned as the first head of the confederation of the Magyar tribes by all Hungarian chronicles. His mother's name and family are unknown. According to historian Gyula Kristó, Árpád was born around 845. His name derived from the Hungarian word for barley, árpa.

The Byzantine emperor Constantine Porphyrogenitus (r. 913–959) states that the Hungarians "had never at any time had any other prince" before Árpád, which is in sharp contrast to the Hungarian chronicles' report of the position of Árpád's father. In Porphyrogenitus's narration, the Khazar khagan initiated the centralization of the command of the Hungarian tribes in order to strengthen his own suzerainty over them. The khagan initially wanted to appoint a chieftain named Levedi to lead the Hungarians. However, Levedi did not accept this offer and suggested that either Álmos or Árpád should be promoted instead of him. The khagan approached the Hungarians with this new proposal. They preferred Árpád to his father, because he was "greatly admired for wisdom and counsel and valour, and capable of this rule". Thereafter, Árpád was made "prince according to the custom ... of the Chazars, by lifting him upon a shield." Constantine Porphyrogenitus erroneously refers to the Magyars as Turks. This was a misnomer, as while the Magyars do have some Turkic genetic and cultural influence, and their historical social structure was of Turkic origin, they are not a Turkic people.

The reliability of the Byzantine emperor's report of Árpád's election is debated by modern historians: for instance, Victor Spinei states that it is "rather vague and scarcely credible", but András Róna-Tas writes that its core is reliable. The latter historian adds that Árpád's election was promoted by Álmos, who forced Levedi to renounce his position as kende. Accordingly, in Róna-Tas's view, Árpád succeeded Levedi as sacred ruler, or kende, which enabled his father to preserve his own position as the actual leader of the Hungarians, or gyula.

The 17th century Volga Bulgar compilation Ja'far Tarikh (a work of disputed authenticity) represents Arbat (i.e Árpád) as the son and successor of Almuş (i.e Álmos) and brother of Khássán (i.e Kurszan).

=== Towards the Hungarian Conquest ===
The earliest reliable source of Árpád's life is an early 10th-century document, the Continuation of the Chronicle by George the Monk. It narrates that the Byzantine Emperor Leo VI the Wise (r. 886–912) sent his envoy Nicetas Sclerus to the Hungarians in 894 or 895 "to give presents" and incite them against the Bulgarian Empire. Sclerus met with their two leaders, Árpád and Kurszán, at the Lower Danube. Sclerus's mission succeeded: a Hungarian army soon crossed the Danube on Byzantine ships against Bulgaria. An interpolation in Porphyrogenitus's text suggests that the invading Hungarians were under the command of Árpád's son, Liüntika.

The positions held by Árpád and Kurszán at the time of their negotiations with Sclerus are debated by historians. Spinei wrote that Árpád was the gyula, and Kurszán was the kende. In contrast, Kristó said that Kurszán was the gyula and Árpád represented his father, Álmos kende.

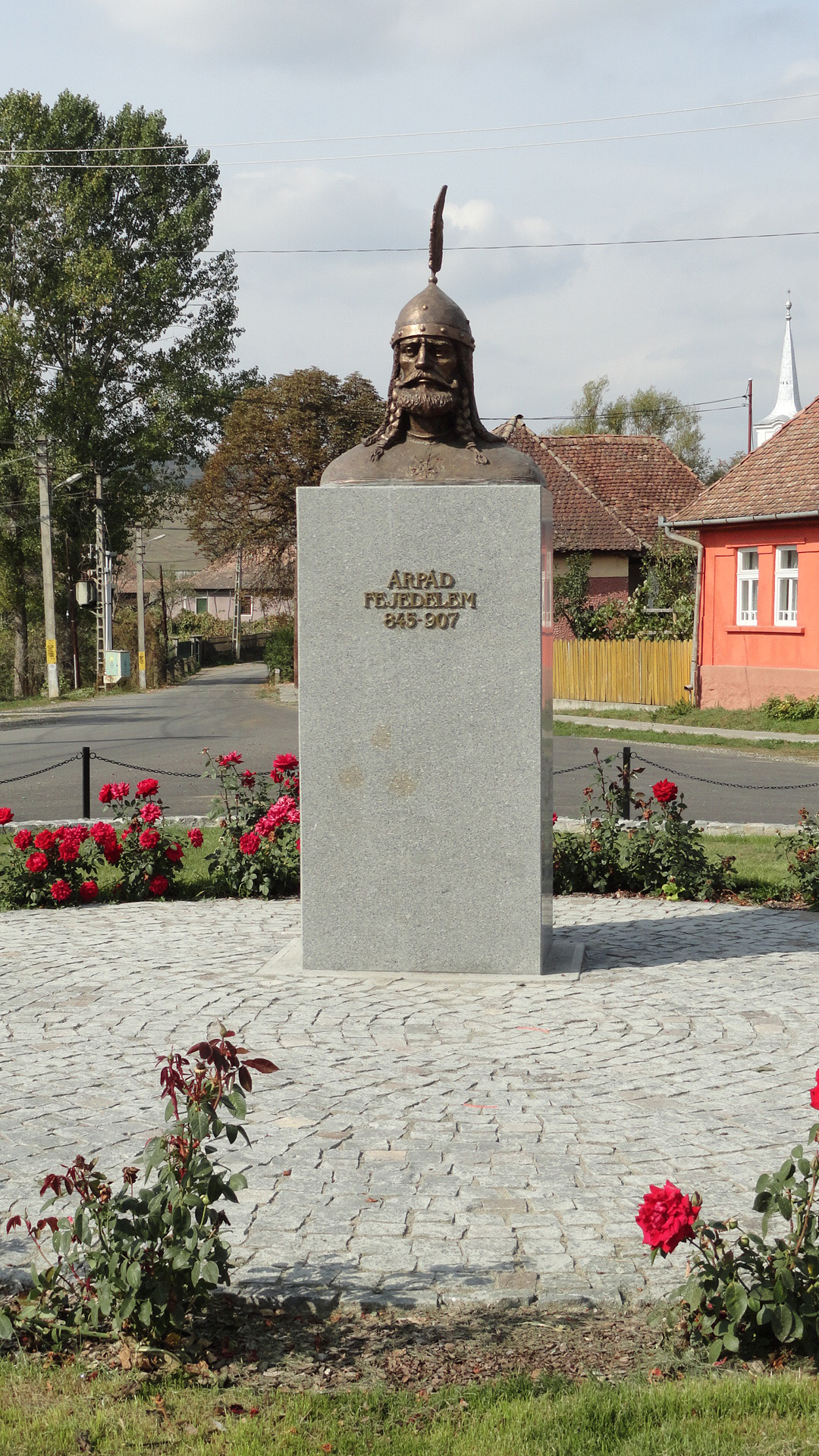
Árpád's statue in Székelybere (Bereni, Romania)

At that time, the Bulgarians had disregarded the peace treaty and were raiding through the Thracian countryside. Justice pursued them for breaking their oath to Christ our God, the emperor of all, and they quickly met up with their punishment. While our forces were engaged against the Saracens, divine Providence led the [Hungarians], in place of the Romans, to campaign against the Bulgarians. Our Majesty's fleet of ships supported them and ferried them across the Danube. [Providence] sent them out against the army of the Bulgarians that had so wickedly taken up arms against Christians and, as though they were public executioners, they decisively defeated them in three engagements, so that the Christian Romans might not willingly stain themselves with the blood of the Christian Bulgarians.

— Leo the Wise: Tactics

The Hungarian army defeated the Bulgarians, but the latter hired the Pechenegs against them. The Bulgarians and Pechenegs simultaneously invaded the Hungarians' territories in the western regions of the Pontic steppes in 895 or 896. The destruction of their dwelling places by the Pechenegs forced the Hungarians to leave for a new homeland across the Carpathian Mountains towards the Pannonian Plain.

The Illuminated Chronicle says that Árpád's father Álmos "could not enter Pannonia, for he was killed in Erdelw" or Transylvania. Engel, Kristó and Molnár, who accept the reliability of this report, wrote that Álmos's death was a ritual murder, similar to the sacrifice of the Khazar khagans in case of a disaster affecting their people. In contrast with them, Róna-Tas states that even if the report on Álmos's murder "reflects true event, the only possible explanation would be that Árpád or someone in his entourage" killed the aged prince. Spinei rejects the Illuminated Chronicle's report on Álmos's murder in Transylvania, because the last mention of Álmos in the contrasting narration of the Gesta Hungarorum is connected to a siege of Ungvár (Uzhhorod, Ukraine) by the Hungarians. The latter chronicle says that Álmos appointed Árpád "as leader and master" of the Hungarians on this occasion.

=== Reign ===
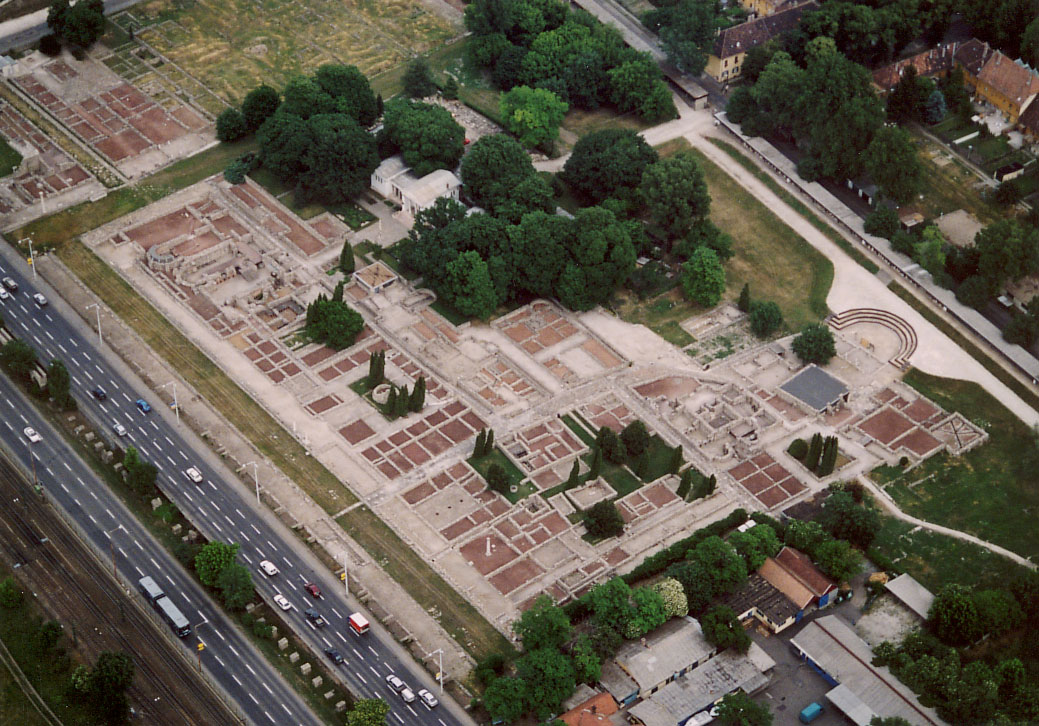
Ruins of Aquincum – "city of King Attila" in the Gesta Hungarorum

Árpád's name "is completely unknown" to all sources written in East Francia, which was one of the main powers of the Carpathian Basin at the turn of the 9th and 10th centuries. These sources, including the Annales Alamannici and the Annales Eisnidlenses, only mention another Hungarian leader, Kurszán. According to Kristó and other historians, these sources suggest that Kurszán must have been the gyula commanding the Hungarian forces, while Árpád succeeded his murdered father as the sacred kende. Proposing a contrasting theory, the Romanian historian Curta wrote that Kurszán was the kende and Árpád gyula only succeeded him when Kurszán was murdered by Bavarians in 902 or 904.

In contrast to nearly contemporaneous sources, Hungarian chronicles written centuries after the events—for instance, the Gesta Hungarorum and the Illuminated Chronicle—emphasize Árpád's pre-eminent role in the conquest of the Carpathian Basin. The Gesta Hungarorum also highlights Árpád's military skills and his generosity. This chronicle also emphasizes that Tétény, one of the heads of the seven Hungarian tribes, acquired "the land of Transylvania for himself and his posterity" only after Árpád had authorized him to conquer it.

Having crossed the Danube, they encamped beside the Danube as far as Budafelhévíz. Hearing this, all the Romans living throughout the land of Pannonia, saved their lives by flight. Next day, Prince Árpád and all his leading men with all the warriors of Hungary entered the city of King Attila and they saw all the royal palaces, some ruined to the foundations, others not, and they admired beyond measure the stone buildings and were happier than can be told that they had deserved to take without fighting the city of King Attila, of whose line Prince Árpád descended. They feasted every day with great joy in the palace of King Attila, sitting alongside one another, and all the melodies and sweet sounds of zithers and pipes along with all the songs of minstrels were presented to them ... Prince Árpád gave great lands and properties to the guests staying with them, and, when they heard this, many guests thronged to him and gladly stayed with him.

— Anonymous: Gesta Hungarorum

The Gesta Hungarorum says that Árpád took "an oath of the leading men and warriors of Hungary," and "had his son, Prince Zoltán elevated" to prince in his life. However, the reliability of this report and the list of the grand princes in the Gesta Hungarorum is dubious. For instance, it ignores Fajsz, who ruled when Constantine VII Porphyrogenitus was completing his De Administrando Imperio around 950.

=== Death ===
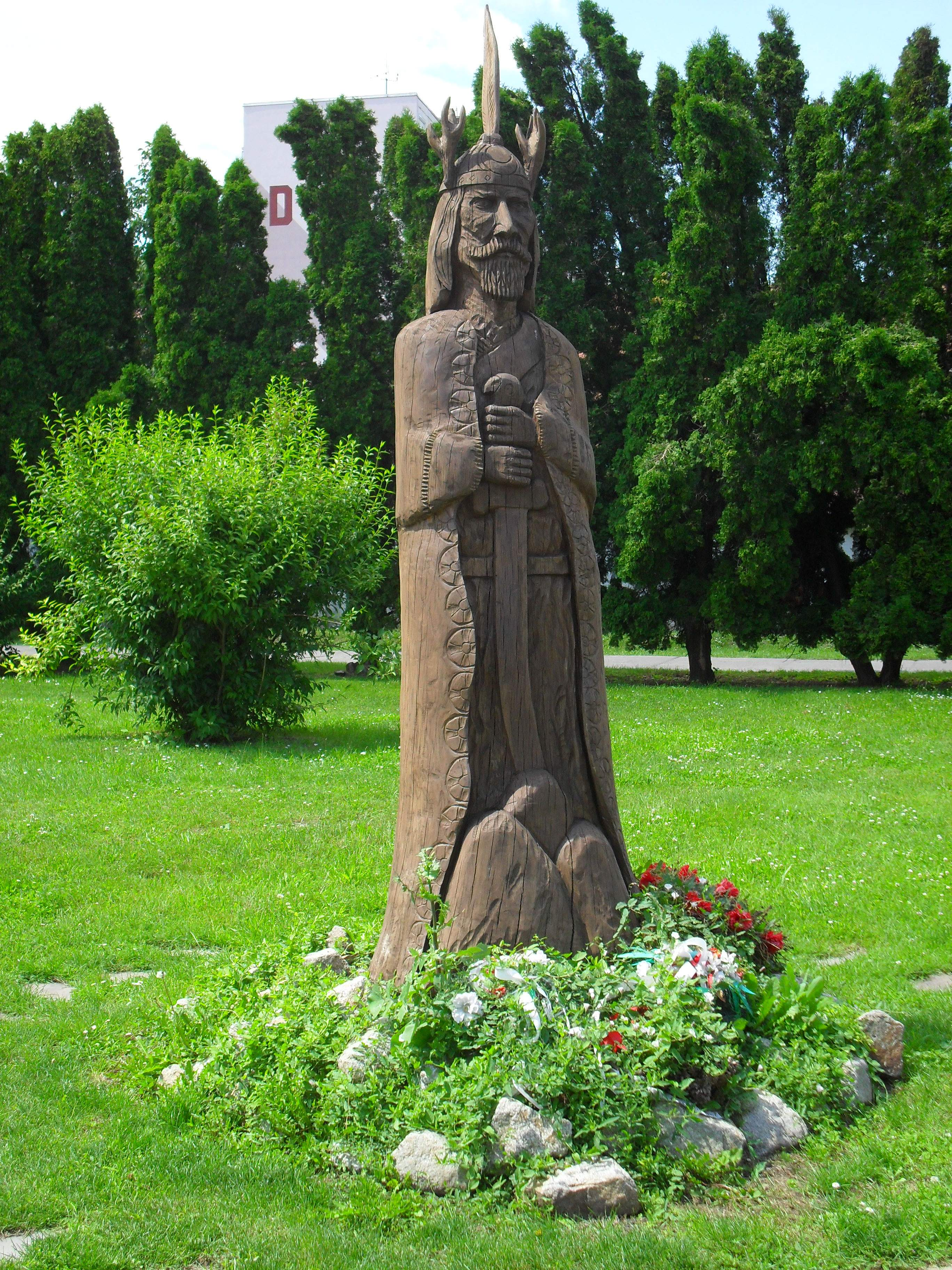
Árpád's statue in Nagymegyer (Veľký Meder, Slovakia)

The date of Árpád's death is debated. The Gesta Hungarorum states that he died in 907. However, Kristó wrote that he actually died in 900 or later because the Gesta says 903 is the starting date of the Hungarian "land-taking" instead of its actual date around 895. If the Gesta's report on his funeral is reliable, Árpád was buried "at the head of a small river that flows through a stone culvert to the city of King Attila" where a village, Fehéregyháza, developed near Buda a century later.

== Legacy ==
The Hungarians arrived in their new homeland within the Carpathians under Árpád. Árpád is the principal actor in the Gesta Hungarorum, which attributes "almost all memorable events" of the "Hungarian land-taking" to him. Furthermore, until the extinction of the male line of his dynasty in 1301, Hungary was ruled by "a single line of princes", all descending from Árpád. Árpád is known among Hungarians as honalapító or the "founder of our homeland".

== Family ==
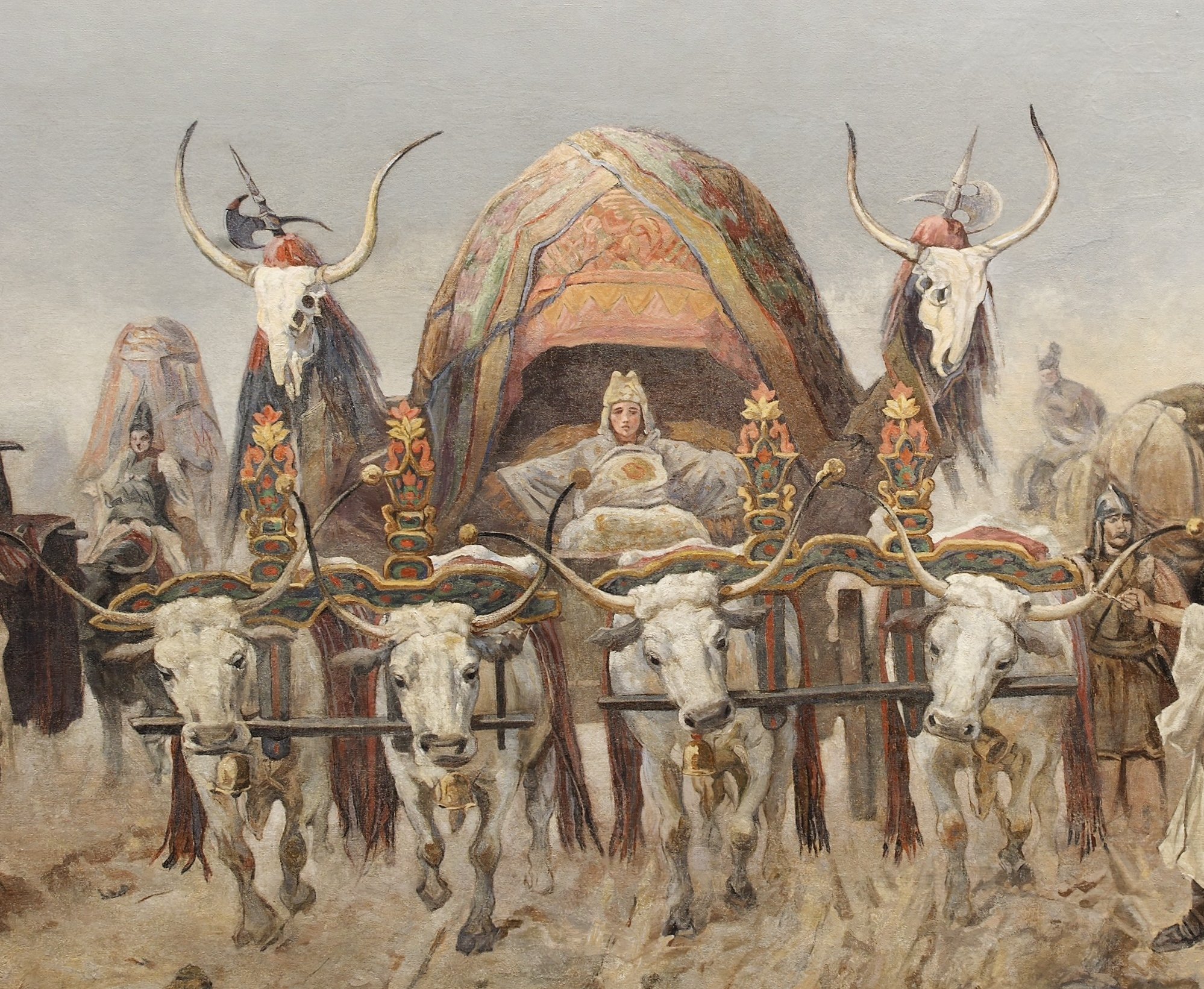
Árpád's wife – a detail on the Arrival of the Hungarians by Árpád Feszty et al. (Ópusztaszer National Heritage Park, Hungary)

Porphyrogenitus says Árpád "had four sons: first, Tarkatzous; second, Ielech; third, Ioutotzas; fourth, Zaltas". However, he also refers to one "Liuntikas, son of" Árpád; Kristó wrote that Liuntikas (Liüntika) was an alternative name of Tarkatzous (Tarhos). The name and family of the mother of Árpád's sons are unknown. The following is a family tree presenting Árpád's ancestors and his descendants to the end of the 10th century:

Ügyek	Eunedubelian
Előd or Ügyek	Emese
Álmos
Árpád
Liüntika*	Tarkatzus*	Jelek	Jutotzas	(unknown)	Zoltán
Teveli	(unknown)	Ezelekh	Falitzi	Tas**	Taksony
Termachu	Zerind the Bald	Kings of Hungary***
Koppány

*Liüntika and Tarkatzus are supposed to have been identical.
**The father of Tas was one of Árpád's four or five sons, but his name is unknown.
***All later grand princes and kings of Hungary descended from Taksony.

== Depictions of Árpád ==
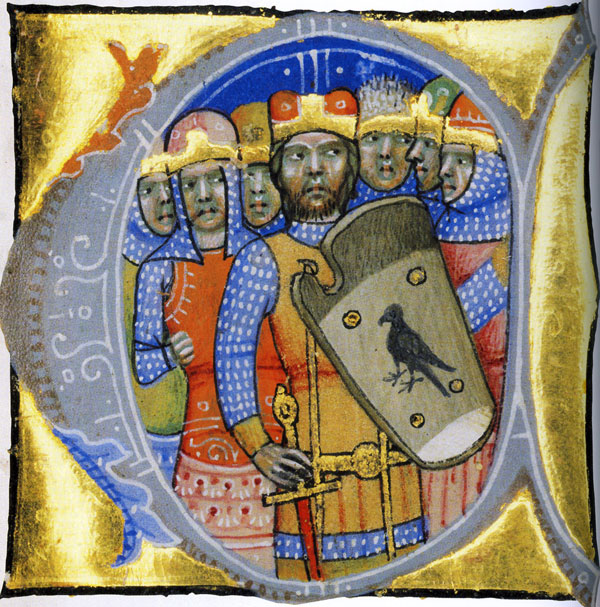
Árpád with Turul shield and princely hat in the center among the seven chieftains of the Hungarians (Chronicon Pictum, 1358)

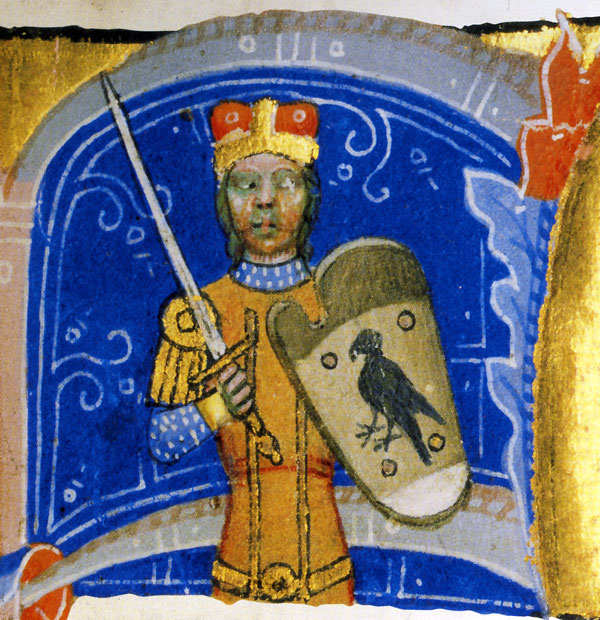
Árpád, the First Captain (Chronicon Pictum, 1358)

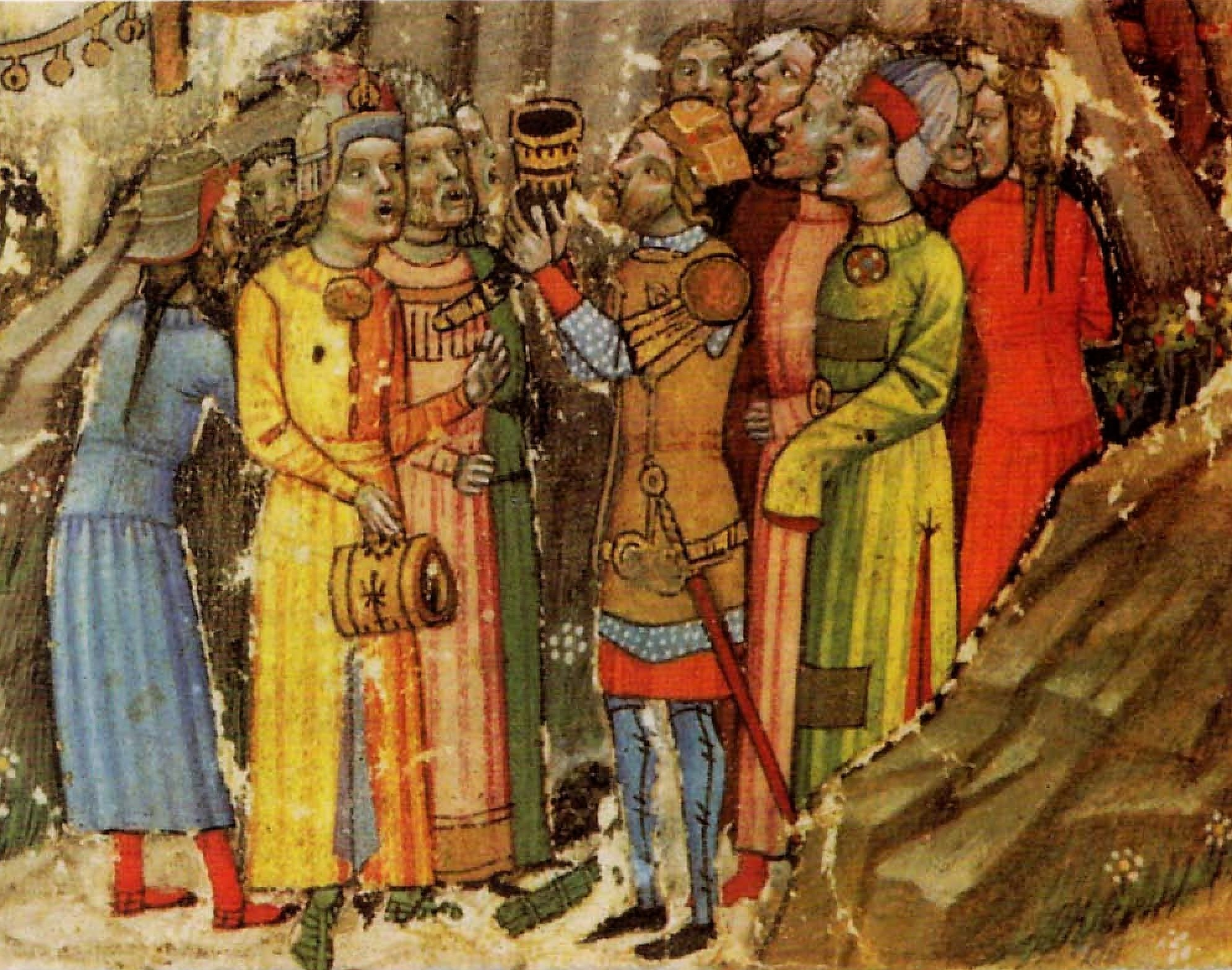
Árpád tastes the water of the Danube, the Hungarians are shouting the name of God three times (Chronicon Pictum, 1358)

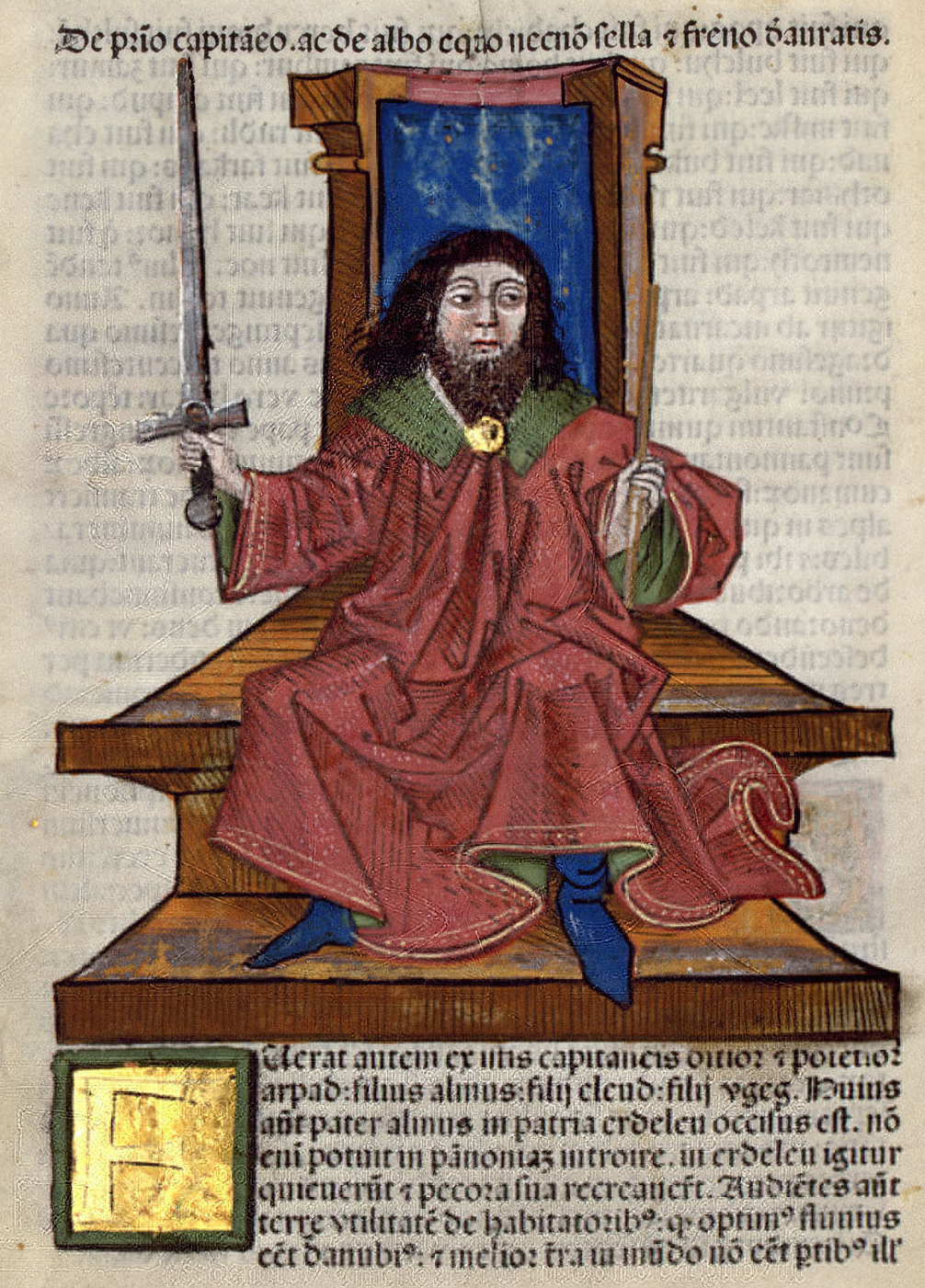
Árpád, the First Captain (Chronica Hungarorum, 1488)

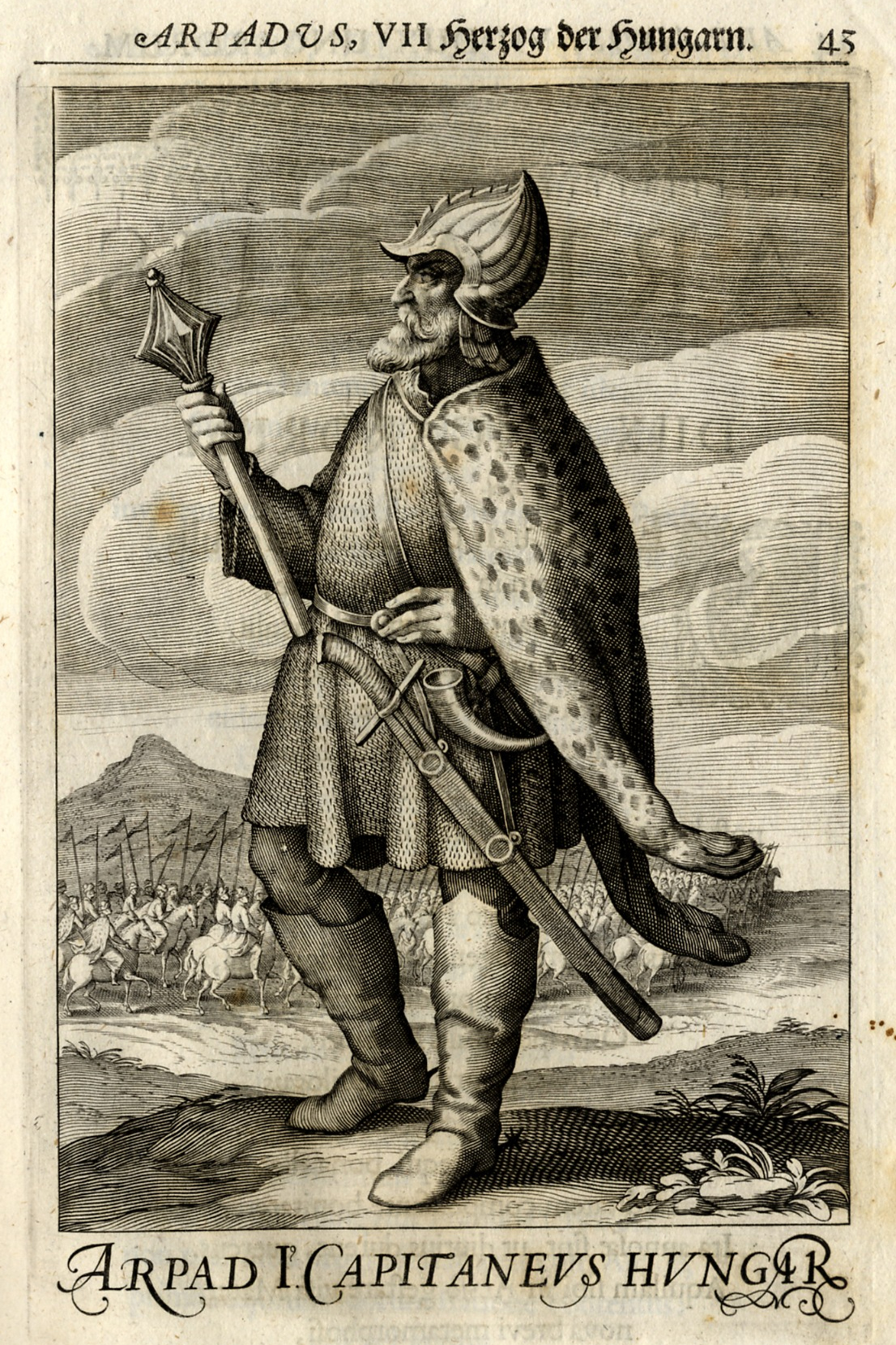
Árpád (Nádasdy Mausoleum, 1664)

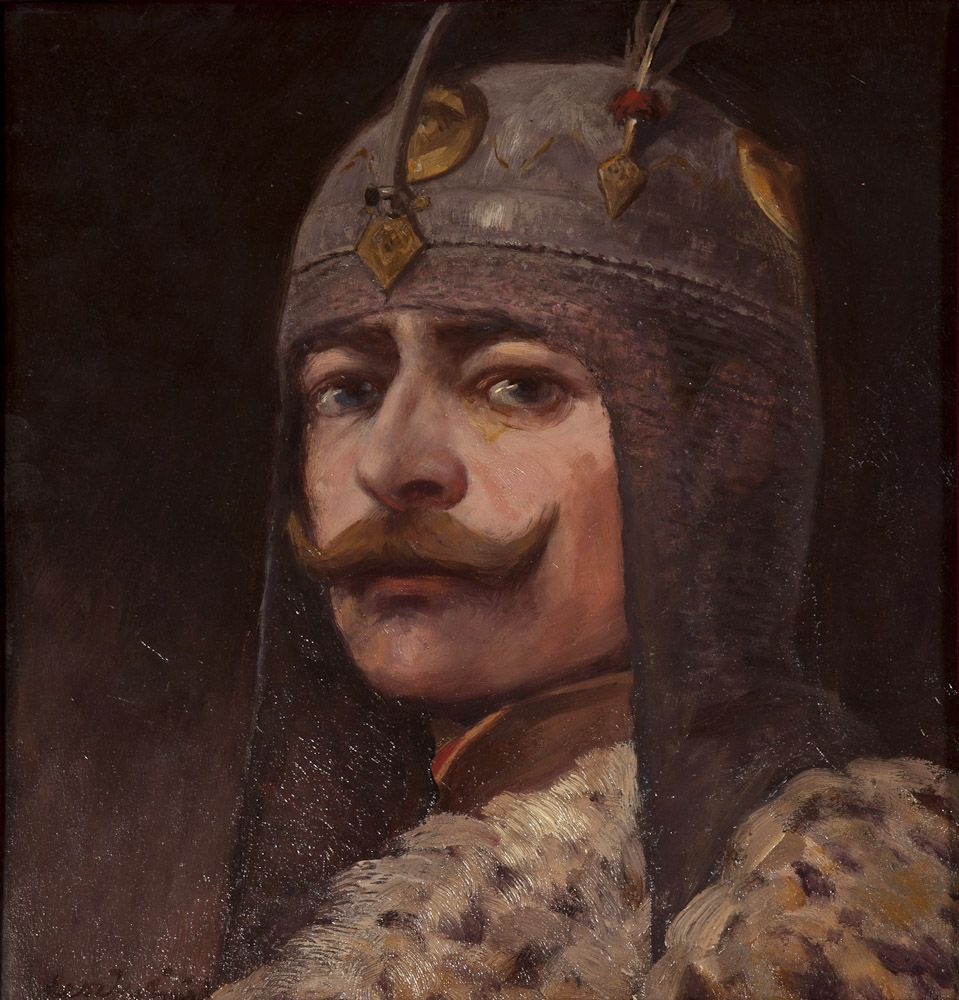
Prince Árpád (painting by Árpád Feszty in 1900)

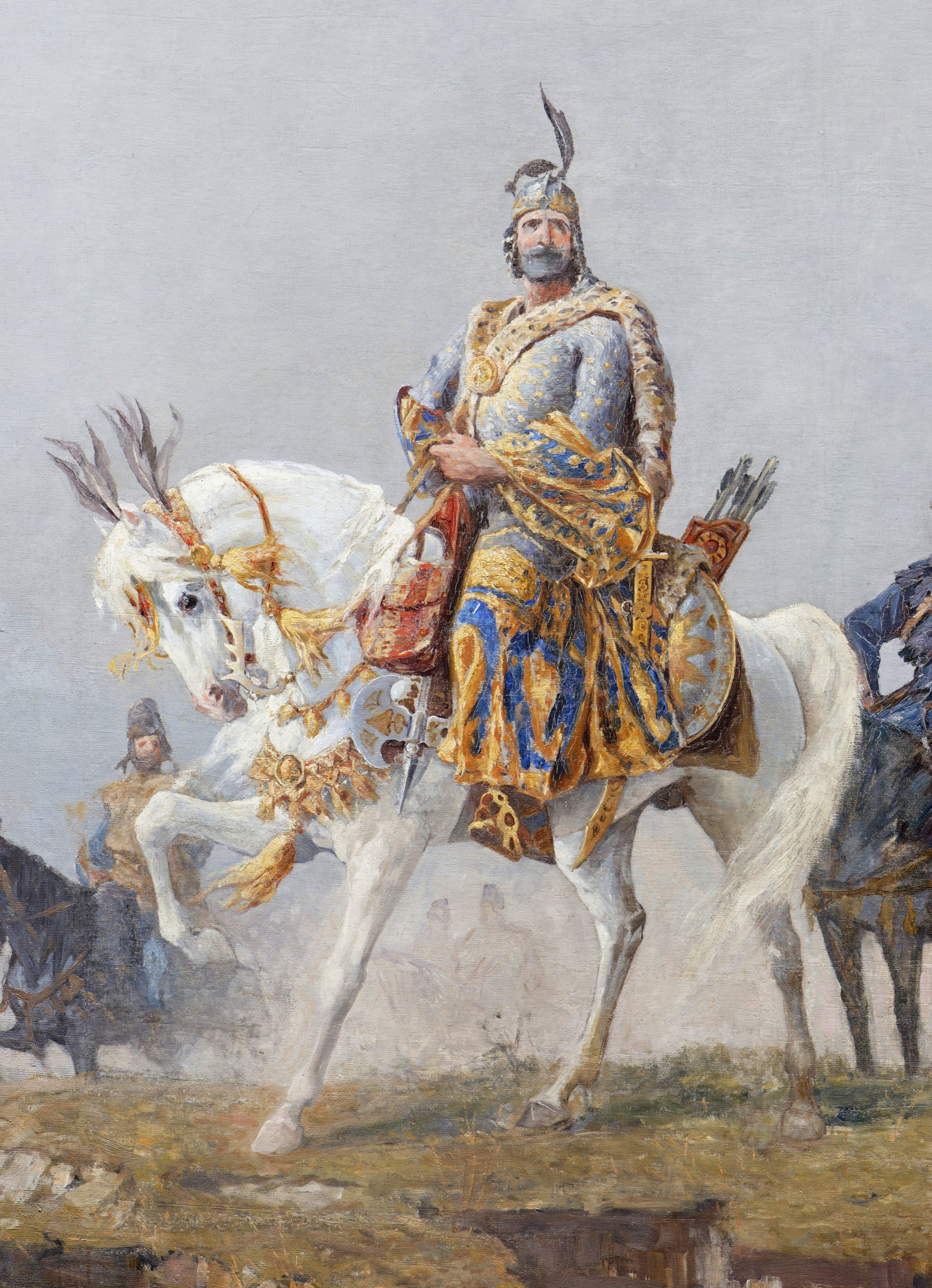
Árpád on Feszty's Panorama (painting by Árpád Feszty in 1892–1894)

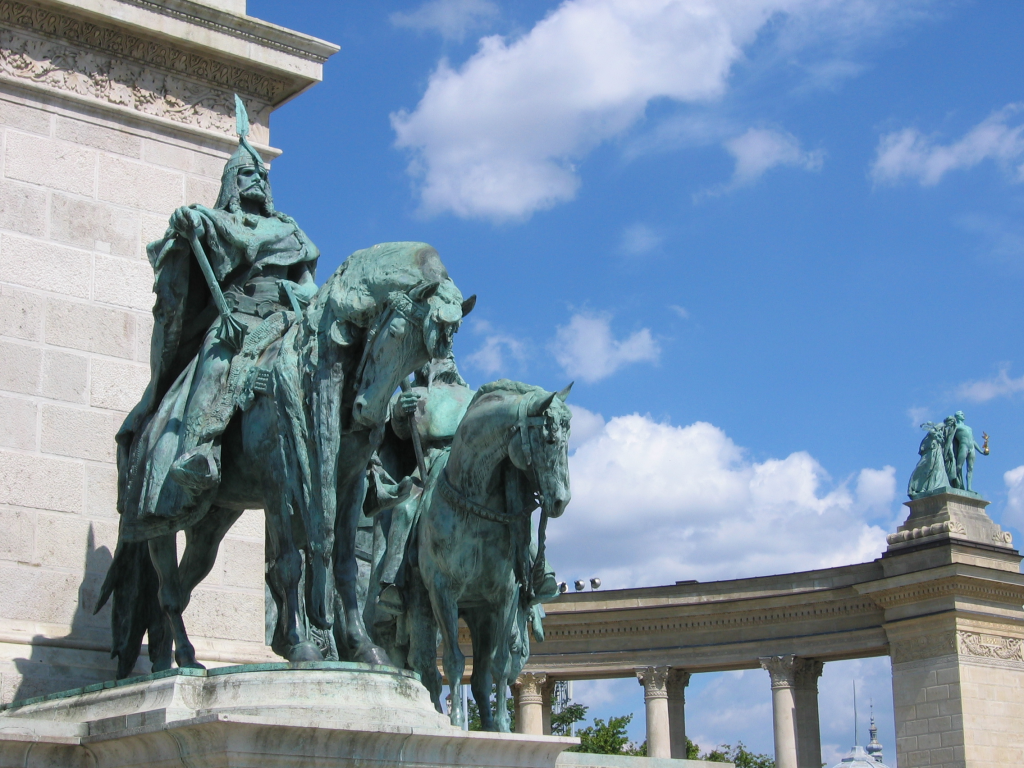
Árpád's statue at the Heroes' Square (Budapest)

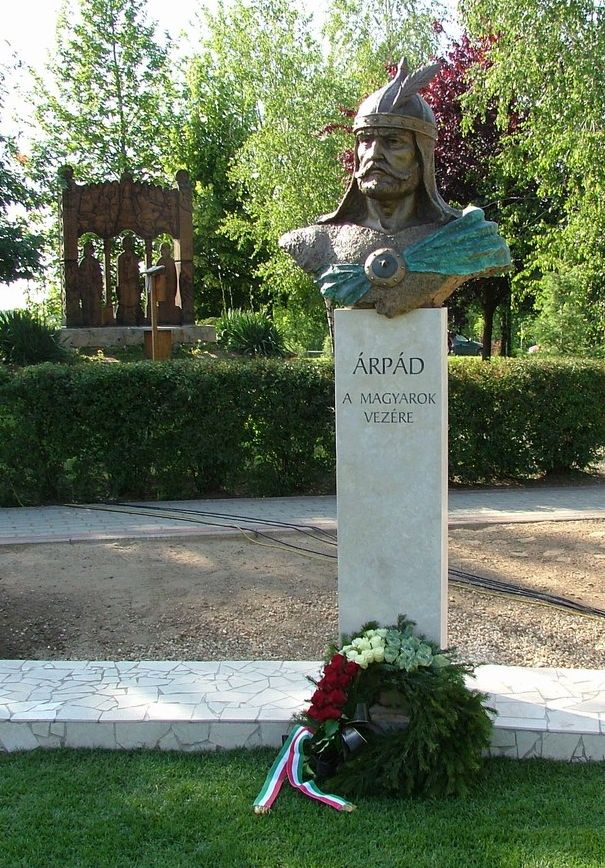
Árpád, Grand Prince of the Hungarians (Richárd Juha, Nyíradony, 2014)

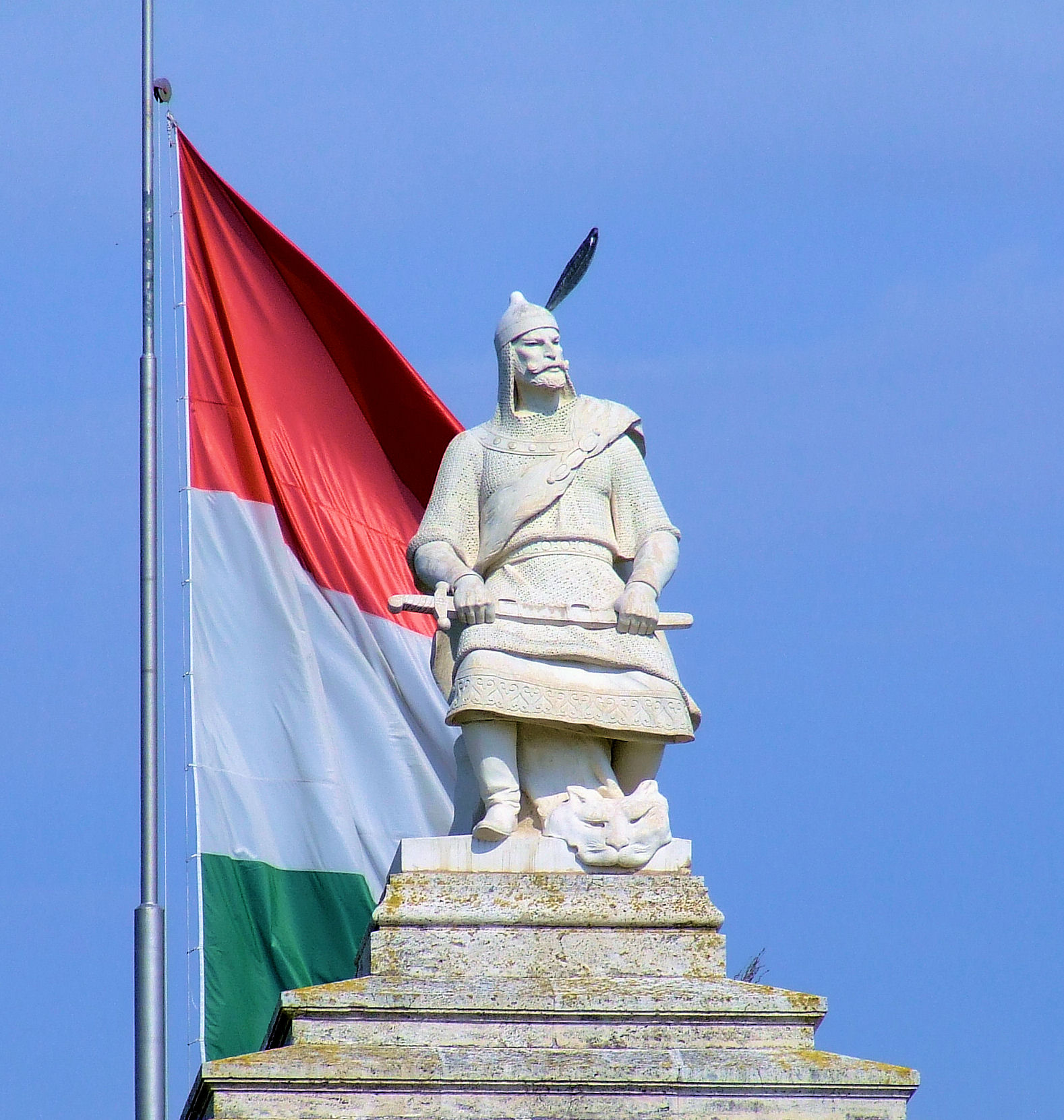
Árpád's statue in Ópusztaszer National Heritage Park (Ede Kallós, 1897)

== See also ==
- Árpáds
- Hungarian prehistory
- History of Hungary

== Footnotes ==
Árpád House of Árpád Born: c. 845 Died: c. 907
Regnal titles
Preceded by Álmos	Grand Prince of the Hungarians c. 895 – c. 907	Succeeded by Zoltán (?)
