= Zoltán of Hungary =

Grand Prince of the Hungarians from c. 907 to c. 950

Zoltán
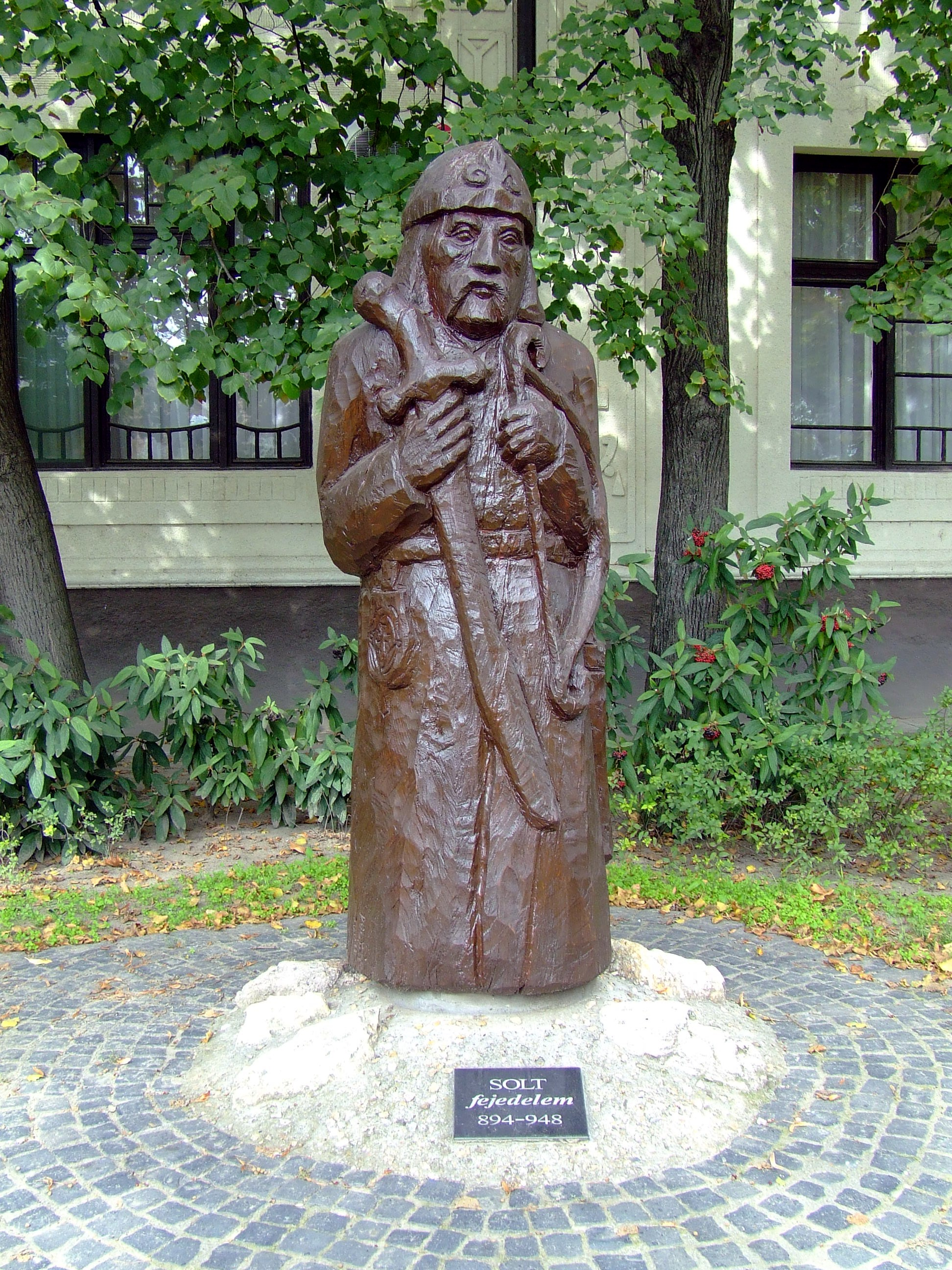
- Zoltán's statue in Solt (Hungary)

Grand Prince of the Hungarians (uncertain)
- Reign: c. 907 – c. 950 (uncertain)
- Predecessor: Árpád (?)
- Successor: Fajsz (?)
- Born: c. 880 or c. 903
- Died: c. 950
- Spouse: Menumorut's unnamed daughter (uncertain)
- Issue: Taksony
- Dynasty: Árpád dynasty
- Father: Árpád
- Religion: Hungarian paganism

Zoltán (Hungarian pronunciation: [ˈzoltaːn]; c. 880 or 903 – c. 950), also Zolta, Zsolt, Solt or Zaltas is mentioned in the Gesta Hungarorum as the third Grand Prince of the Hungarians who succeeded his father Árpád around 907. Although modern historians tend to deny this report on his reign, because other chronicles do not list him among the Hungarian rulers, there is consensus that even if Zoltán never ascended the throne, all monarchs ruling in Hungary from the House of Árpád after around 955 were descended from him.

== Life ==
=== Zoltán in the Gesta Hungarorum ===
Modern historians' main source of Zoltán's life is the Gesta Hungarorum, a late 12th-century chronicle whose writer is now known as Anonymus. According to this source, Zoltán was the only son of Árpád, Grand Prince of the Hungarians. In contrast, the nearly contemporary Byzantine Emperor Constantine VII Porphyrogenitus writes that "Zaltas" was Árpád's fourth son. Zoltán's name seemingly derived from the Arabian sultan title with Turkic mediation, but modern scholars have not unanimously accepted this etymology.

According to Anonymus, Zoltán was born after 903, during his father's second campaign against Menumorut. The latter was one of the many local rulers who are solely mentioned in the Gesta Hungarorum among the opponents of the Hungarians during their conquest of the Carpathian Basin. In the Gesta Hungarorum's narration, Menumorut was forced to surrender and to give his daughter in marriage to Zoltán in 904 or 905. When Menumorut died, Zoltán inherited his father-in-law's duchy east of the river Tisza, which Anonymus claims was inhabited by "the peoples that are called Kozár". Anonymus also states that Zoltán, still a minor, succeeded his father who died around 907. Zoltán, in turn, later abdicated in favour of his son Taksony and died "in the third year of his son's reign".

And his son Zolta succeeded [Árpád], who was similar to his father in character but dissimilar in appearance. Prince Zolta was a little lisping and pale, with soft, blonde hair, of middling stature; a warlike duke, brave in spirit, merciful to his subjects, sweet of speech, but covetous of power, whom all the leading men and warriors of Hungary loved marvelously. Some time later, when Zolta was thirteen, all the leading men of the realm by their common counsel and of their equal wish appointed rectors of the kingdom beneath the prince to mend through the guidance of customary law the conflicts and lawsuits of litigants.

— Anonymus: Gesta Hungarorum

=== Modern historians' views ===
Nowadays historians reject most details of Zoltán's life presented by Anonymus. For instance, the Hungarian historian Gyula Kristó says that Zoltán was born around 880 instead of around 903. His Romanian colleague Alexandru Madgearu likewise writes that either Zoltán was born many years earlier than 903 or his marriage must have happened years after 904.

Zoltán's father-in-law's identity is also debated. Medievalist Pál Engel says that Menumorut is one of the "imaginary figures" invented by Anonymus in order to describe the conquering Hungarians' heroic wars against them. Historian Charles R. Bowlus writes that he was a Moravian ruler whose daughter's marriage with Zoltán symbolized the end of "Great Moravia". Medievalist Tudor Sălăgean also says that Menumorut was a real person, the ruler of a one-time duchy inhabited by Romanians, Slavs and many other peoples at the turn of the 9th and 10th centuries.

Anonymus's statement that Zoltán succeeded his father as grand prince, or even the idea that Zoltán ever ruled the federation of the Hungarian tribes have also been challenged. For instance, historian Sándor L. Tóth points that Zoltán, being the youngest among Árpád's four sons, could hardly precede his elder brothers in the line of succession. Kristó also says that other Hungarian chroniclers do not make mention of Zoltán's rule, implying that Anonymus only inserted Zoltán into the incompletely preserved list of the grand princes because he knew that all Hungarian monarchs from the House of Árpád descended from him.

== Family ==
The following is a family tree presenting Zoltán's closest-known relatives:

Álmos
Árpád	Menumorut*
Zoltán	daughter
Taksony
Kings of Hungary**

*Whether Menumorut is an actual or an invented person is debated by modern scholars.
**All later grand princes and kings of Hungary (until 1301) descended from Taksony.

== See also ==
- Principality of Hungary

== Sources ==
=== Primary sources ===
- Anonymus, Notary of King Béla: The Deeds of the Hungarians (Edited, Translated and Annotated by Martyn Rady and László Veszprémy) (2010). In: Rady, Martyn; Veszprémy, László; Bak, János M. (2010); Anonymus and Master Roger; CEU Press; ISBN 978-963-9776-95-1.
- Constantine Porphyrogenitus: De Administrando Imperio (Greek text edited by Gyula Moravcsik, English translation by Romillyi J. H. Jenkins) (1967). Dumbarton Oaks Center for Byzantine Studies. ISBN 0-88402-021-5.

=== Secondary sources ===
- Bowlus, Charles R. (1994). Franks, Moravians and Magyars: The Struggle for the Middle Danube, 788–907. University of Pennsylvania Press. ISBN 0-8122-3276-3.
- Engel, Pál (2001). The Realm of St Stephen: A History of Medieval Hungary, 895–1526. I.B. Tauris Publishers. ISBN 1-86064-061-3.
- Madgearu, Alexandru (2005). The Romanians in the Anonymus Gesta Hungarorum: Truth and Fiction. Romanian Cultural Institute, Center for Transylvanian Studies. ISBN 973-7784-01-4.
- Sălăgean, Tudor (2005). "Romanian Society in the Early Middle Ages (9th–14th Centuries AD)". In Pop, Ioan-Aurel; Bolovan, Ioan (eds.). History of Romania: Compendium. Romanian Cultural Institute (Center for Transylvanian Studies). pp. 133–207. ISBN 978-973-7784-12-4.
- Tóth, Sándor László (1994). "Zaltas". In Kristó, Gyula; Engel, Pál; Makk, Ferenc (eds.). Korai magyar történeti lexikon (9-14. század) [=Encyclopedia of the Early Hungarian History (9th-14th centuries)] (in Hungarian). Akadémiai Kiadó. p. 741. ISBN 963-05-6722-9.

Zoltán of Hungary House of Árpád Born: c. 880 or 903 Died: c. 950
Regnal titles
Preceded by Árpád	Grand Prince of the Hungarians (?) c. 907 – c. 950	Succeeded by Fajsz (?)
