= Ladislas the Bald =

Member of the House of Árpád (c. 997–1030)

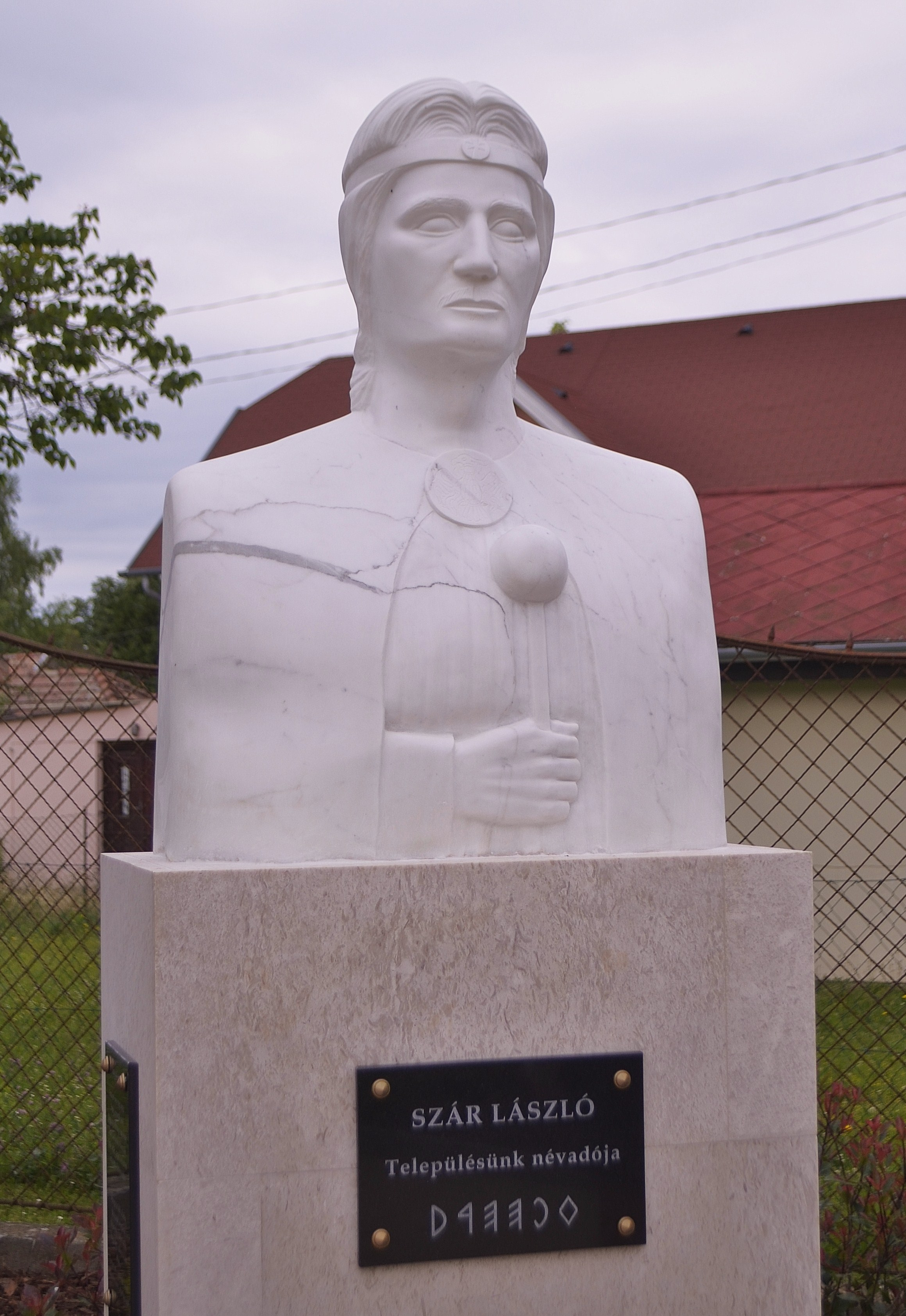
- Bust of Ladislas the Bald, Balatonszárszó

Duke of Nyitra (debated)
- Reign: c. 977–995
- Predecessor: Michael
- Successor: Stephen

Duke of Nyitra (debated)
- Reign: 997 or 1001–before 1030
- Predecessor: Géza
- Successor: Stephen
- Born: before 997
- Died: before 1030
- Spouse: Premislava from Kievan Rus' (debated)
- Issue: Bonuzlo or Domoslav
- Dynasty: Árpád dynasty
- Father: Michael of Hungary
- Religion: Christian

Ladislas the Bald (Hungarian: Szár László; Latin: Ladislas calvus; before 997–before 1030) was a member of the House of Árpád, a grandson of Taksony, Grand Prince of the Hungarians. He is the only known brother of Vazul, a rebellious duke who was blinded on the order of their cousin, King Saint Stephen I of Hungary in 1031 or 1032. Medieval chroniclers, in their effort to conceal that the Kings of Hungary were descended from a prince condemned by the saintly first king, wrote that instead of Vazul, Ladislas was the Hungarian monarchs' forefather. Ján Steinhübel and other modern Slovak historians write that he was Duke of Nyitra under Polish suzerainty, but this theory has not been universally accepted by historians.

== Life ==
Ladislas was a son of Michael, who was the younger son of Grand Prince Taksony. According to Hungarian historians, including Gyula Kristó, he was the younger of Michael's two sons. On the other hand, Steinhübel and other Slovak scholars write his brother, Vazul was younger than him. Their mother's name is unknown. György Györffy writes that she "may have been" related to Samuel of Bulgaria, because her two sons' name was popular in Samuel's family.

Györffy also writes that neither Ladislas nor his brother, both still minors, were in the position to hold administrative functions when their father died sometime before 997. In contrast with this view, Vladimir Segeš writes that their uncle, Grand Prince Géza appointed Ladislas to administer the "Duchy of Nitra" soon after their father was murdered, around 977, on the same grand prince's orders. Segeš adds that Géza dismissed Ladislas in favor of his own son, Stephen in 995, but the latter, when succeeded Géza as grand prince in 997, again granted the duchy to Ladislas.

A third view is presented by Steinhübel. He writes that Ladislas the Bald only became the duke of Nitra after Bolesław I the Brave, Duke of Poland occupied large territories to the north of the river Danube in 1001 from Stephen, who had in the meantime been crowned the first king of Hungary. Segeš likewise writes that Ladislas administered for the second time the Duchy of Nitra under Polish suzerainty in the early 11th century. On the other hand, the theory that large territories to the north of the Danube were under Polish suzerainty in the early 11th century – which is only based on a late source, the Polish-Hungarian Chronicle – is sharply criticized by Györffy. He writes that the "Duchy of Nitra" was administered by one of King Stephen's henchmen, Hont in this period.

Whether Ladislas died as a vassal of Boleslaus the Brave or of Stephen I is debated even by Slovak historians. According to Segeš, he only died after the Poles withdrew from the Duchy of Nitra in 1018, and upon his death his brother, Vazul succeeded him as King Stephen's vassal. On the other hand, Steinhübel says that Ladislas was still Boleslaus the Brave's vassal when he died and his brother succeeded him sometime before 1030.

== Family ==
The Illuminated Chronicle writes that he took "his wife from Ruthenia". Based on this report, the Hungarian historian, Gyula Kristó says that she was a member of the Rurik dynasty of the Kievan Rus'. He adds that her name was possibly Premislava. According to many Hungarian chronicles, Ladislas was the forefather of the kings of Hungary reigning after 1046, because he fathered three sons, including, Kings Andrew I and Béla I of Hungary. However, other sources, including the Chronicle of Zagreb and a Legend of Saint Gerard, preserved the tradition that their father was actually Vazul. Both Györffy and Steinhübel write that Ladislas the Bald had a son, but his name was Bonuzlo, according to the former, and Domoslav, according to the latter.

The following family tree presents Vazul's ancestry and his offspring.

Árpád | Menumorut (a)
Zoltán | daughter
Taksony | a "Cuman" lady (b)
Géza | Michael | a Bulgarian princess (c)
Stephen I of Hungary | a lady of the Tátony clan | Vazul | Ladislas the Bald | Premislava (d)
Levente (e) | Andrew I of Hungary (e) | Béla I of Hungary (e) | Bonuzlo or Domoslav
Solomon of Hungary | Kings of Hungary (from 1074)

(a) Whether Menumorut is an actual or an invented person is debated by modern scholars.
(b) A Khazar, Pecheneg or Volga Bulgarian lady.
(c) Györffy writes that she may have been a member of the Bulgarian Cometopuli dynasty.
(d) Kristó writes that she may have been a member of the Rurik dynasty from Kievan Rus'.
(e) Many Hungarian chronicles write that Levente, Andrew and Béla were Ladislas the Bald's sons, but the reliability of this report is dubious according to modern historians.

== Sources ==
- Bartl, Július; Čičaj, Viliam; Kohútova, Mária; Letz, Róbert; Segeš, Vladimír; Škvarna, Dušan (2002). Slovak History: Chronology & Lexicon. Bolchazy-Carducci Publishers, Slovenské Pedegogické Nakladatel'stvo. ISBN 0-86516-444-4.
- Györffy, György (1994). King Saint Stephen of Hungary. Atlantic Research and Publications. ISBN 0-88033-300-6.
- Györffy, György (2000). István király és műve [=King Stephen and his Work] (in Hungarian). Balassi Kiadó.
- Kristó, Gyula (2001). "The Life of King Stephen the Saint". In Zsoldos, Attila (ed.). Saint Stephen and His Country: A Newborn Kingdom in Central Europe – Hungary. Lucidus Kiadó. pp. 15–36. ISBN 978-963-86163-9-5.
- Kristó, Gyula; Makk, Ferenc (1996). Az Árpád-ház uralkodói [=Rulers of the House of Árpád] (in Hungarian). I.P.C. Könyvek. ISBN 963-7930-97-3.
- Steinhübel, Ján (2011). "The Duchy of Nitra". In Teich, Mikuláš; Kováč, Dušan; Brown, Martin D. (eds.). Slovakia in History. Cambridge University Press. pp. 15–29. ISBN 978-0-521-80253-6.
- The Hungarian Illuminated Chronicle: Chronica de Gestis Hungarorum (Edited by Dezső Dercsényi) (1970). Corvina, Taplinger Publishing. ISBN 0-8008-4015-1.
