= Vazul =

11th-century member of the House of Árpád

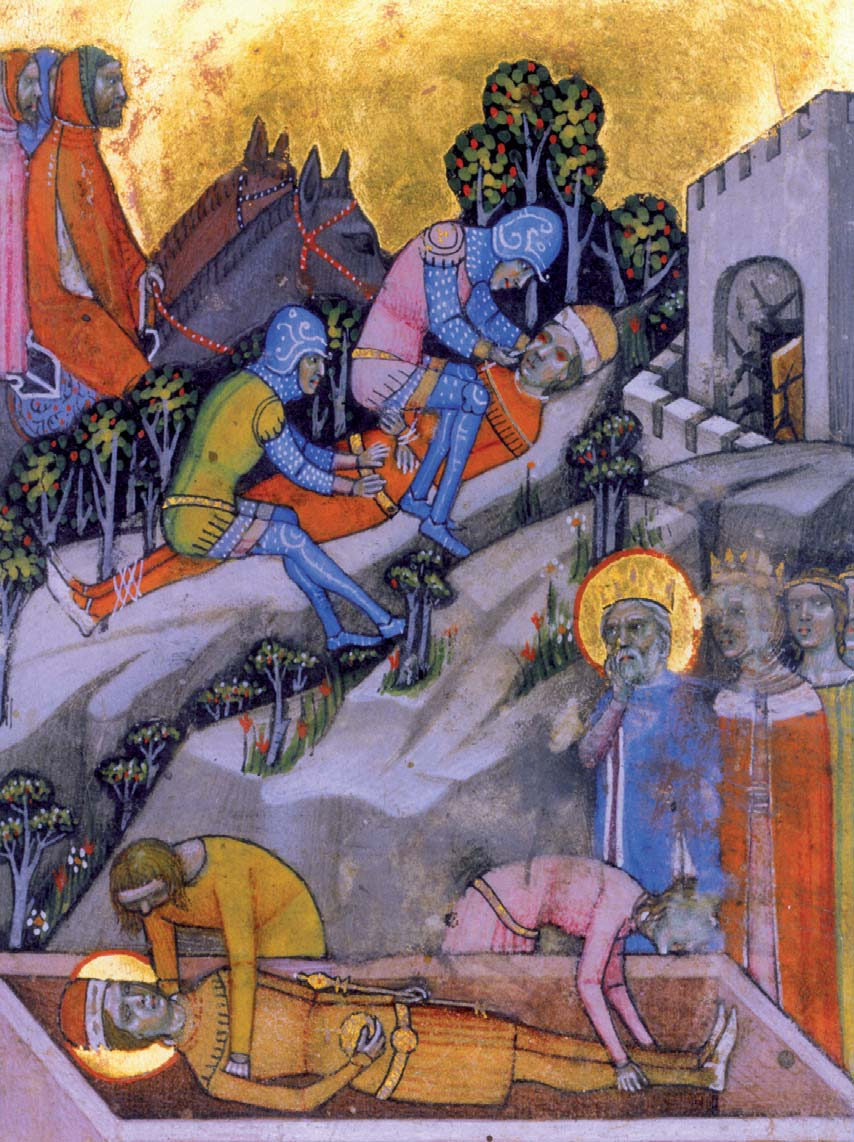
- The blinding of Vazul, as depicted in the Illuminated Chronicle

Duke of Nyitra (debated)
- Reign: before 1030 –1031
- Predecessor: Ladislas the Bald (debated)
- Successor: Stephen (debated)
- Born: before 997
- Died: 1031 or 1032
- Spouse: unknown member of Tátony clan
- Issue: Andrew I of Hungary; Béla I of Hungary; Levente
- Dynasty: Árpád dynasty
- Father: Michael

Vazul, or Vászoly, (before 997–1031 or 1032) was a member of the House of Árpád, a grandson of Taksony, Grand Prince of the Hungarians. The only other certain information about his life is that he was kept in captivity and blinded in the fortress of Nyitra (Nitra, Slovakia) in the last years of the reign of his cousin, King Stephen I of Hungary. Modern historians, including György Györffy, do not exclude that he had earlier been Duke of Nyitra. He is the forefather of nearly all Kings of Hungary who reigned after 1046.

== Life ==
Vazul was a son of Michael, who was the younger son of Grand Prince Taksony. His mother's name is unknown. According to György Györffy, it is "probable" that she was a Bulgarian princess, a relative of Samuel of Bulgaria. Györffy also writes that Vazul was still a child around 997. His name derived from the Greek Basileios which implies that he was baptized according to Byzantine rite.

Györffy says that Vazul "apparently" held the "Nyitra ducate", because chronicles do not make mention of other settlements in connection with his life. According to the Illuminated Chronicle, King Stephen imprisoned Vazul and held him in captivity in the fortress of Nyitra (Nitra, Slovakia) in order to urge him to "amend his youthful frivolity and folly". In contrast with Györffy, his Slovak colleague, Ján Steinhübel has no doubt that Vazul was a Duke of Nyitra, who succeeded his brother, Ladislas the Bald before 1030. Steinhübel adds that Vazul, similarly to his brother, accepted the suzerainty of King Mieszko II of Poland; he was imprisoned at his former seat when King Stephen I of Hungary occupied his duchy in 1031. The theory that the "Duchy of Nyitra" was under Polish suzerainty in the first decades of the 11th century, which is based on the Polish-Hungarian Chronicle, is flatly refused by Györffy.

Emeric, the only son of King Stephen who survived infancy died in a hunting accident in 1031. Although Vazul who was Stephen's closest agnatic relative had the strongest claim to succeed him on the throne, the king disregarded him and nominated his own sister's son, Peter Orseolo as his heir. According to the nearly contemporaneous Annals of Altaich, Vazul bitterly resented his omission, but he was blinded on King Stephen's order. According to the contrasting reports of later Hungarian chronicles, written under kings descending from Vazul's line, Stephen initially was planning to nominate Vazul as his heir, but Vazul's enemies, including Stephen's queen, Gisela hatched a plot to hinder the king's plans. They sent an "evil man" to Nyitra who "put out Vazul's eyes and filled the cavities of his ears with lead" before the king's envoys arrived.

Feeling his powers slipping away, [King Stephen] sent messengers in haste to have his uncle's son Vazul brought from prison in Nitra, in order to make him king of the Hungarians after himself. However, as soon as Queen Gisela got wind of this she hatched a plot with a group of traitors, and sent the ispán Sebus ahead of the messenger. Sebus had Vazul's eyes put out and molten lead poured into his ears; he then fled to Bohemia. When Vazul was at length brought back by the King's messenger, the King wept bitterly at his fate.

— Simon of Kéza: The Deeds of the Hungarians

== Family ==
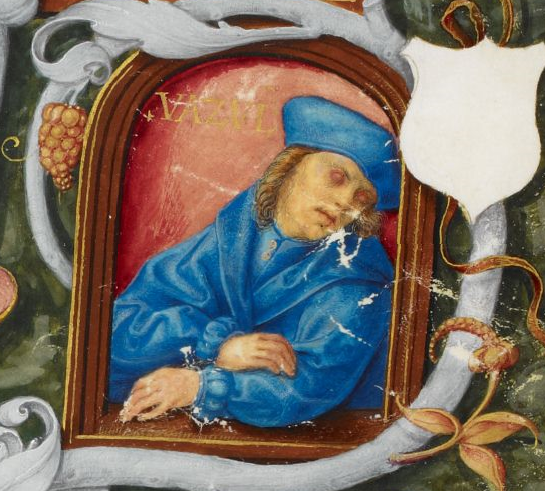
A 16th-century depiction of Vazul among the ancestors of the House of Braganza

Information on Vazul's family is contradictory. Later Hungarian chronicles tended to hide that the kings reigning after 1046 descended from a prince who was disinherited and sentenced by the holy first king of Hungary. Accordingly, many of the chronicles write that Vazul's brother, Ladislas the Bald, was the Hungarian monarchs' forefather. However, a report recorded in the Illuminated Chronicle has preserved the memory of Vazul's paternity of three sons named Andrew, Béla, and Levente. Likewise the Illuminated Chronicle writes that Vazul's wife was a member of the Tátony clan, but his marriage lacked legitimacy. His three sons were expelled from Hungary after Vazul's death in 1031 or 1032.

It is said that these three brothers [Andrew, Béla and Levente] were the sons of Duke Vazul by some girl from the clan of Tatun and were not born of a true marriage-bed, and that through this conjunction they derived their nobility from Tatun. Of a certainty this is a false and most evil tale. Not for this reason are they nobles, but because they are the sons of Ladislas the Bald, who is said to have taken a wife from Ruthenia to whom these three brothers were born.

— The Hungarian Illuminated Chronicle

Györffy and Gerics claimed that the name Tatun, wife of Vazul, is the misspelling of Khatun, which was a royal title among people of Turkish origins from Manchuria to Bulgaria. Its meaning was "the first wife of the khagan". According to Györffy, a girl from the kindred Tatun was the daughter of Tatun, the wife of Kean (mentioned in the Hungarian chronicles), i. e. the tsar of Bulgaria, whose family fled to Hungary when Basil II, Byzantine Emperor put an end to the existence of Bulgarian state (996-1004, 1014–1018). Gerics claimed that Vazul and Tatun were still pagan at the time of their marriage, and that is the reason that the Hungarian chronicles declared that Andrew, Béla, and Levente, the sons of Duke Vazul, were not born of a true marriage-bed. Gerics also claimed that Tatun might have participated in the riot of Koppány, and subsequently lost their noble status. For this reason the Hungarian chronicles declared that the sons of Vazul derived their nobility from their father, not their mother.

The following family tree presents Vazul's ancestry and his offspring.

Árpád	Menumorut*
Zoltán	daughter
Taksony	a "Cuman" lady**
Géza	Michael	a Bulgarian princess***
Stephen I of Hungary	a lady of the Tátony clan	Vazul	Ladislas the Bald	Premislava****
Levente	Andrew I of Hungary	Anastasia of Kiev	Béla I of Hungary	Richeza of Poland
Solomon of Hungary	Kings of Hungary (from 1074)

*Whether Menumorut is an actual or an invented person is debated by modern scholars.
**A Khazar, Pecheneg or Volga Bulgarian lady.
***Györffy writes that she may have been a member of the Bulgarian Cometopuli dynasty.
****Kristó writes that she may have been a member of the Rurik dynasty from Kievan Rus'.

== Sources ==
=== Primary sources ===
- Simon of Kéza: The Deeds of the Hungarians (Edited and translated by László Veszprémy and Frank Schaer with a study by Jenő Szűcs) (1999). CEU Press. ISBN 963-9116-31-9.
- The Hungarian Illuminated Chronicle: Chronica de Gestis Hungarorum (Edited by Dezső Dercsényi) (1970). Corvina, Taplinger Publishing. ISBN 0-8008-4015-1.

=== Secondary sources ===
- Engel, Pál (2001). The Realm of St Stephen: A History of Medieval Hungary, 895–1526. I.B. Tauris Publishers. ISBN 1-86064-061-3.
- Györffy, György (1994). King Saint Stephen of Hungary. Atlantic Research and Publications. ISBN 0-88033-300-6.
- Györffy, György (2000). István király és műve [=King Stephen and his Work] (in Hungarian). Balassi Kiadó.
- Kordé, Zoltán (1994). "Taksony". In Kristó, Gyula; Engel, Pál; Makk, Ferenc (eds.). Korai magyar történeti lexikon (9-14. század) [=Encyclopedia of the Early Hungarian History (9th-14th centuries)] (in Hungarian). Akadémiai Kiadó. p. 659. ISBN 963-05-6722-9.
- Kristó, Gyula; Makk, Ferenc (1996). Az Árpád-ház uralkodói [=Rulers of the House of Árpád] (in Hungarian). I.P.C. Könyvek. ISBN 963-7930-97-3.
- Kristó, Gyula (2001). "The Life of King Stephen the Saint". In Zsoldos, Attila (ed.). Saint Stephen and His Country: A Newborn Kingdom in Central Europe – Hungary. Lucidus Kiadó. pp. 15–36. ISBN 978-963-86163-9-5.
- Sinor, Denis (1959). A History of Hungary. A. Praeger.
- Steinhübel, Ján (2011). "The Duchy of Nitra". In Teich, Mikuláš; Kováč, Dušan; Brown, Martin D. (eds.). Slovakia in History. Cambridge University Press. pp. 15–29. ISBN 978-0-521-80253-6.
- Veszprémy, László (1994). "Vazul". In Kristó, Gyula; Engel, Pál; Makk, Ferenc (eds.). Korai magyar történeti lexikon (9-14. század) [=Encyclopedia of the Early Hungarian History (9th-14th centuries)] (in Hungarian). Akadémiai Kiadó. pp. 721–722. ISBN 963-05-6722-9.
