= Michael of Hungary =

Michael
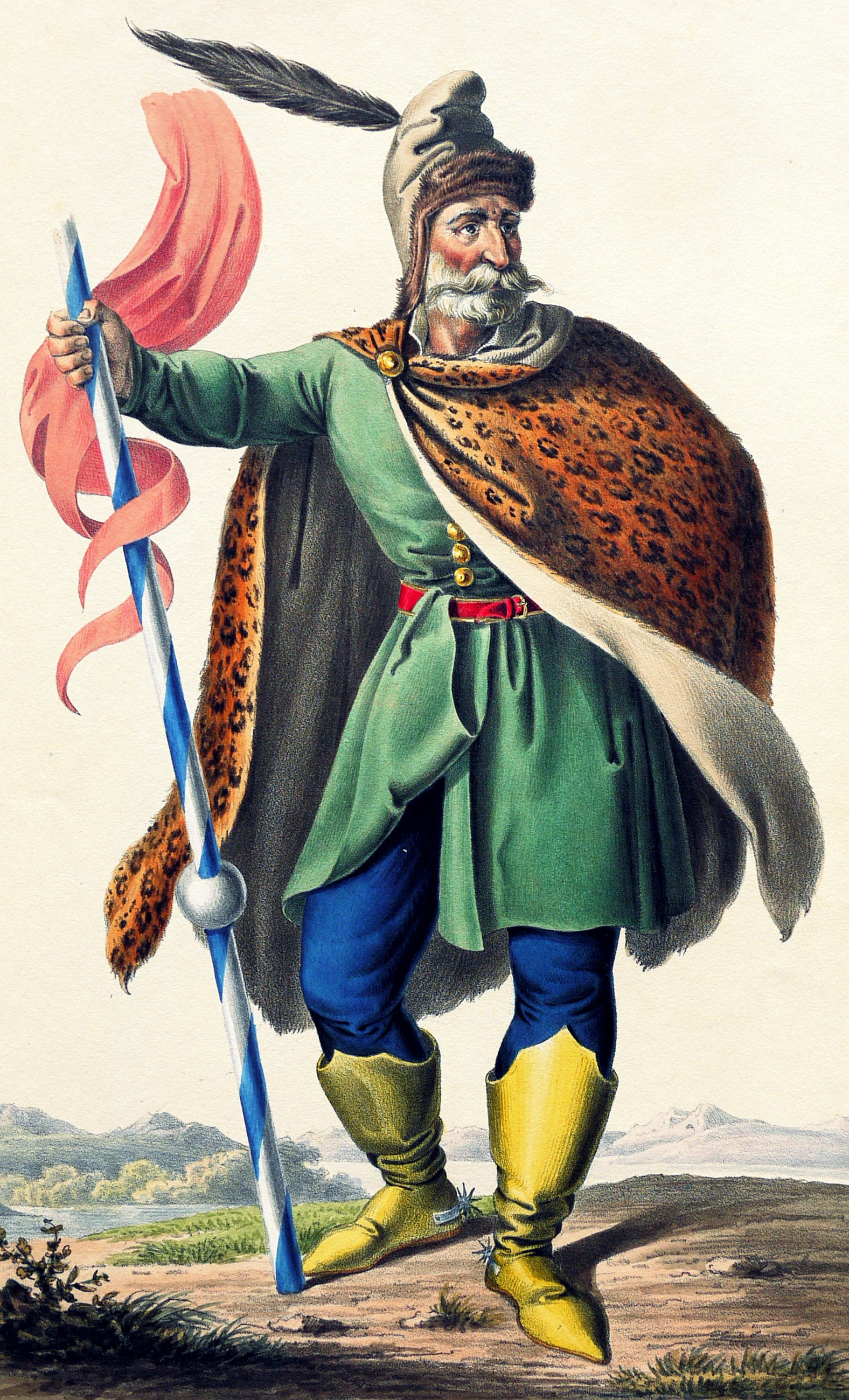
- 19th-century lithography by Josef Kriehuber

Duke of Nyitra (debated)
- Reign: c. 971 –c. 977 or 995
- Predecessor: Géza
- Successor: Stephen or Ladislas the Bald
- Born: c. 960
- Died: c. 977 or 995
- Spouse: a member of the Cometopuli dynasty debated
- Issue: Vazul; Ladislas the Bald
- Dynasty: Árpád dynasty
- Father: Taksony

Michael (Hungarian: Mihály; after 960–995 or c. 997) was a member of the House of Árpád, a younger son of Taksony, Grand Prince of the Hungarians. Most details of his life are uncertain. Almost all kings of Hungary after 1046 descended from him.

According to the Hungarian historian György Györffy, Michael received a ducatus or duchy from his brother, Grand Prince Géza. Slovak historians specify that he administered the "Duchy of Nitra" between around 971 and 997. However, neither of these theories have universally been accepted by historians.

== Life ==
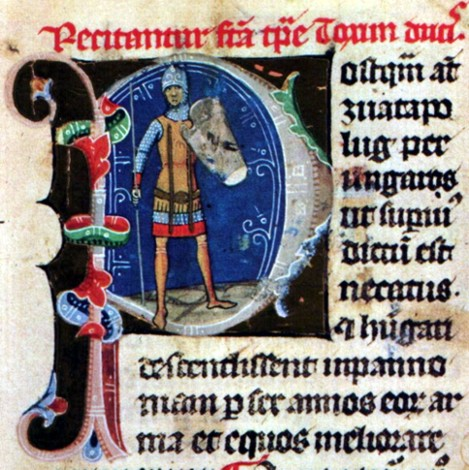
Michael's father, Taksony, depicted in the Illuminated Chronicle

Anonymus, the unknown author of the late-12th-century Gesta Hungarorum narrates that Michael's father, Taksony, took his wife "from the land of the Cumans". However, the lands dominated by the Cumans at Anonymus's time had been controlled by the Pechenegs up until the 1050s. Accordingly, Györffy proposes that Taksony's wife was the daughter of a Pecheneg tribal leader. Other historians, including Zoltán Kordé and Gyula Kristó, say that Anonymous's report may refer either to her Khazar or to her Volga Bulgarian origin.

Michael was Taksony's younger son. Györffy writes that he was still a minor when he was baptized around 972. He received baptism together with his elder brother, Géza, who succeeded their father as Grand Prince around that time. Michael was named after the archangel Michael. According to Györffy, the frequent use of the name "Béla" by his descendants—four kings and two dukes from the House of Árpád bore this name—implies that it was Michael's original pagan name. He also writes that the "a" ending of his name excludes that it was borrowed from a Slavic language, because "a" is a feminine ending in these languages. Instead, he proposes that the name derived from the Turkic bojla title.

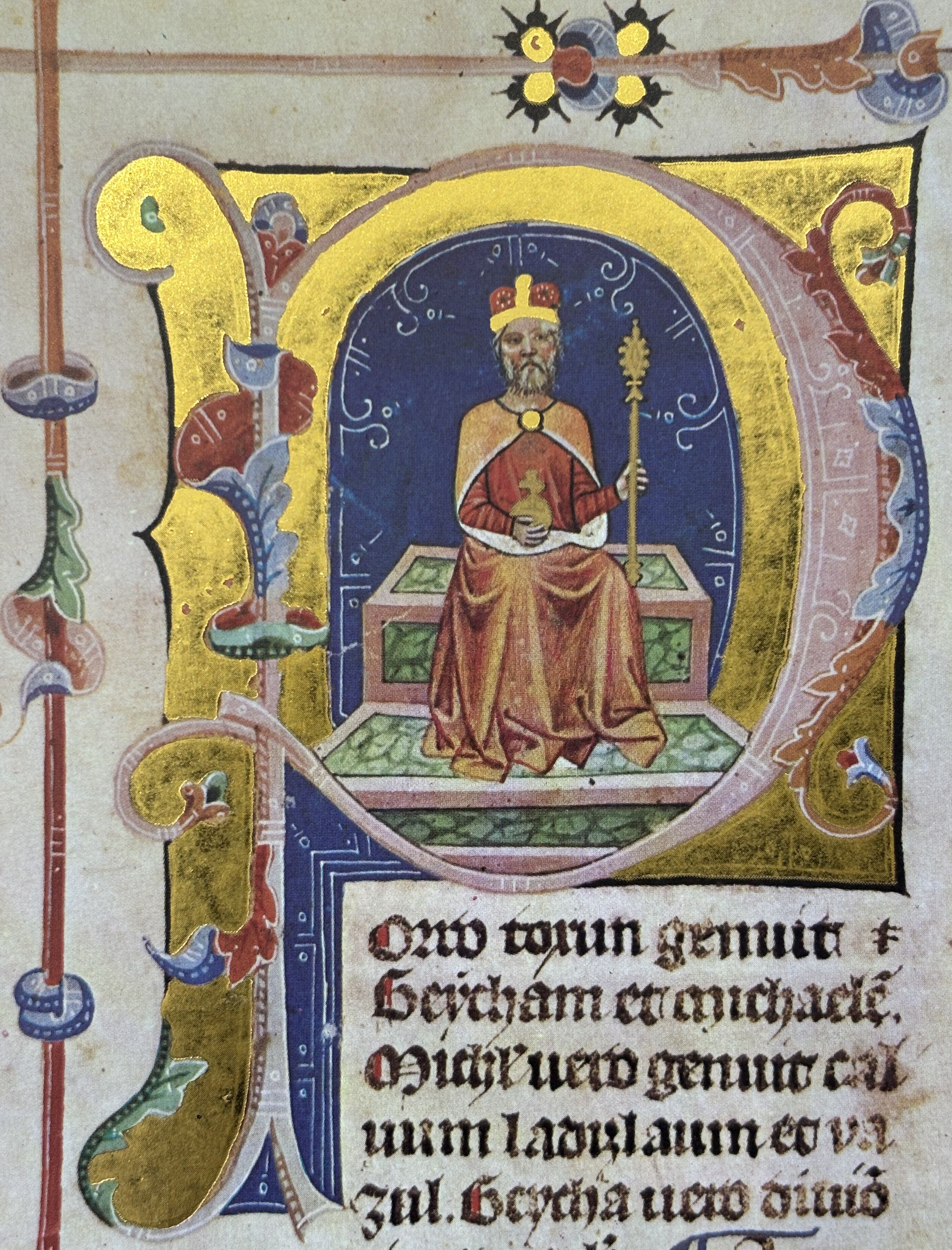
Michael's brother, Géza, depicted in the Illuminated Chronicle

According to Györffy, Michael was a close ally of his brother, since there is no proof that their relationship was ever tense. Therefore, Györffy continues, Géza "probably gave one of the ducatus" in the Principality of Hungary to Michael, although there is no record of these events. According to Steinhübel, Michael received the "Duchy of Nitra" around 971. His colleague, Ján Lukačka, adds that it was Michael who broke "the resistance of the native nobles" in this duchy.

Michael's fate is unknown; Györffy proposes that he either died before his brother (who died in 997) or renounced of his duchy in favor of Géza's son, Stephen, without resistance. On the other hand, Steinhübel writes that Michael was murdered in 995, an action "for which his brother Géza was probably responsible". Lukačka likewise says that Michael "was killed, apparently, on the orders of" Géza. Finally, Vladimír Segeš also says that Géza had Michael murdered, according to him between 976 and 978, but he writes that Michael was succeeded by his own son, Ladislas the Bald.

== Family ==
The names of Michael's two sons, Vazul (Basil) and Ladislas, have been preserved. According to Györffy, "it is probable" that Michael's wife was related to Samuel of Bulgaria, because the names of his both sons were popular among Eastern Christian rulers, including the members of the Cometopuli family. Györffy adds that Michael married his Bulgarian wife when he came of age around 980. The following family tree presents Michael's ancestry and his offspring.

Árpád	Menumorut*
Zoltán	daughter
Taksony	a "Cuman" lady**
Géza	Michael	a Bulgarian princess***
Kings of Hungary (to 1046)	a lady of the Tátony clan	Vazul	Ladislas the Bald	Premislava****
Kings of Hungary (from 1046)	Bonuzlo or Domoslav

*Whether Menumorut is an actual or an invented person is debated by modern scholars.
**A Khazar, Pecheneg or Volga Bulgarian lady.
***Györffy writes that she may have been a member of the Bulgarian Cometopuli dynasty.
****Kristó writes that she may have been a member of the Rurik dynasty from Kievan Rus'.

== Sources ==
- Anonymus, Notary of King Béla: The Deeds of the Hungarians (Edited, Translated and Annotated by Martyn Rady and László Veszprémy) (2010). In: Rady, Martyn; Veszprémy, László; Bak, János M. (2010); Anonymus and Master Roger; CEU Press; ISBN 978-963-9776-95-1.
- Györffy, György (1994). King Saint Stephen of Hungary. Atlantic Research and Publications. ISBN 0-88033-300-6.
- Györffy, György (2000). István király és műve [=King Stephen and his Work] (in Hungarian). Balassi Kiadó.
- Kordé, Zoltán (1994). "Taksony". In Kristó, Gyula; Engel, Pál; Makk, Ferenc (eds.). Korai magyar történeti lexikon (9-14. század) [=Encyclopedia of the Early Hungarian History (9th-14th centuries)] (in Hungarian). Akadémiai Kiadó. p. 659. ISBN 963-05-6722-9.
- Kristó, Gyula; Makk, Ferenc (1996). Az Árpád-ház uralkodói [=Rulers of the House of Árpád] (in Hungarian). I.P.C. Könyvek. ISBN 963-7930-97-3.
- Lukačka, Ján (2011). "The beginnings of the nobility in Slovakia". In Teich, Mikuláš; Kováč, Dušan; Brown, Martin D. (eds.). Slovakia in History. Cambridge University Press. pp. 30–37. ISBN 978-0-521-80253-6.
- Segeš, Vladimír (2002). "Nitra Appanage Duchy". In Bartl, Július; Čičaj, Viliam; Kohútova, Mária; Letz, Róbert; Segeš, Vladimír; Škvarna, Dušan (eds.). Slovak History: Chronology & Lexicon. Bolchazy-Carducci Publishers, Slovenské Pedegogické Nakladatel'stvo. p. 278. ISBN 0-86516-444-4.
- Steinhübel, Ján (2011). "The Duchy of Nitra". In Teich, Mikuláš; Kováč, Dušan; Brown, Martin D. (eds.). Slovakia in History. Cambridge University Press. pp. 15–29. ISBN 978-0-521-80253-6.
