= Taksony of Hungary =

Grand Prince of the Hungarians from c. 955 to the early 970s

Taksony
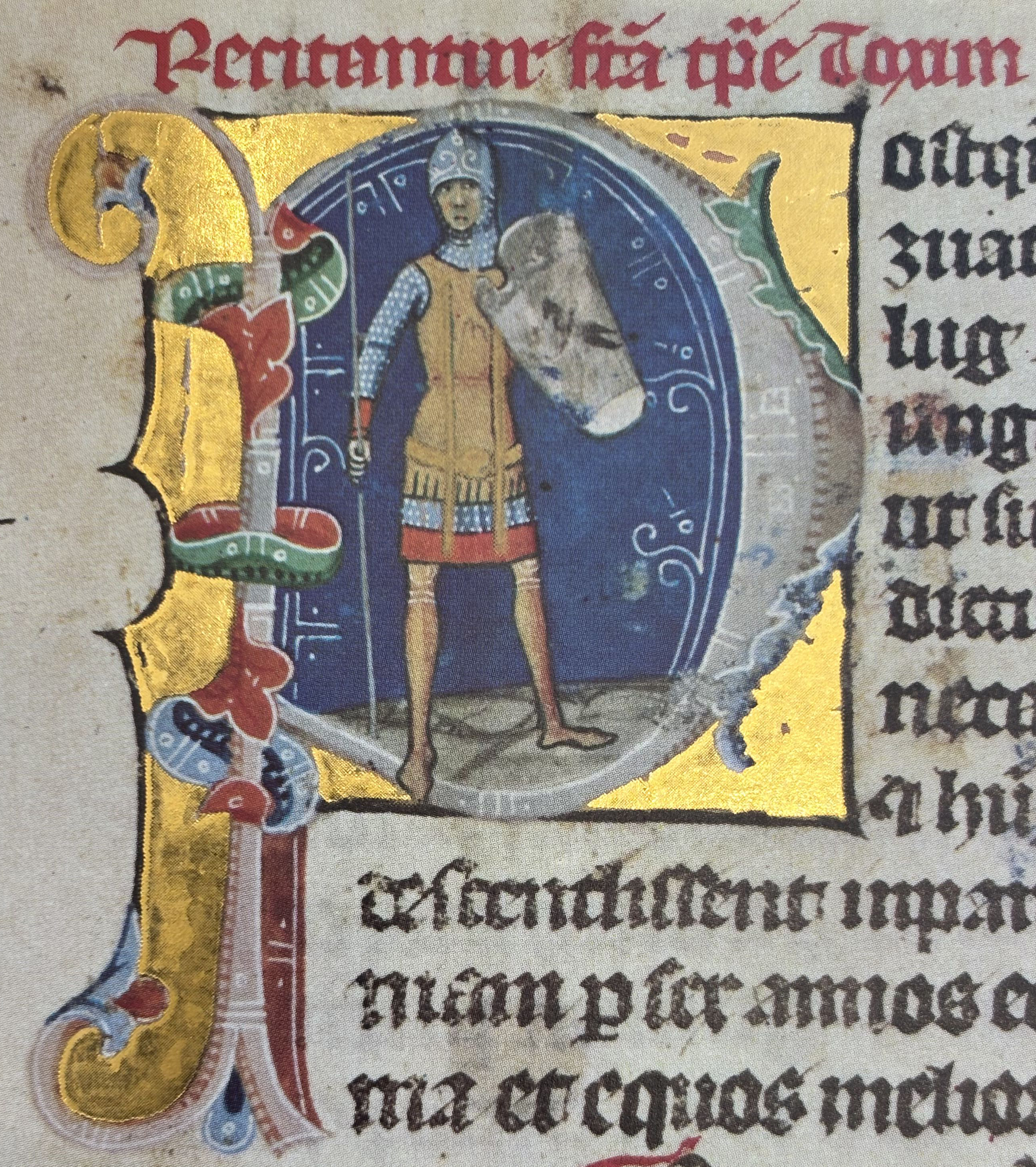
- Depicted in the Illuminated Chronicle

Grand Prince of the Hungarians
- Reign: c. 955 – early 970s
- Predecessor: Fajsz
- Successor: Géza
- Born: c. 931
- Died: early 970s
- Issue: Géza; Michael
- Dynasty: Árpád dynasty
- Father: Zoltán
- Mother: Menumorut's unnamed daughter (debated)
- Religion: Hungarian paganism

Taksony ([ˈtɒkʃoɲ], also Taxis or Tocsun; before or around 931 – early 970s) was the Grand Prince of the Hungarians after their catastrophic defeat in the 955 Battle of Lechfeld. In his youth he had participated in plundering raids in Western Europe, but during his reign the Hungarians only targeted the Byzantine Empire. The Gesta Hungarorum recounts that significant Muslim and Pecheneg groups settled in Hungary under Taksony.

== Early life ==
Taksony was the son of Zoltán, according to the Gesta Hungarorum (written around 1200). The same source adds that Taksony's mother was an unnamed daughter of Menumorut, a local ruler defeated by the conquering Hungarians shortly before 907. Its unknown author also says that Taksony was born "in the year of Our Lord's incarnation 931". The Gesta Hungarorum reports that Zoltán abdicated in favor of Taksony in 947, three years before his own death.

However, modern historians have challenged existing information on Taksony's early life. A nearly-contemporaneous source—Liudprand of Cremona's Retribution—narrates that Taksony led a plundering raid against Italy in 947, which suggests that he was born considerably earlier than 931. His father's reign was preserved only in the Gesta Hungarorum; its anonymous author lists Zoltán among the grand princes, and all later Hungarian monarchs were descended from him. The Byzantine Emperor Constantine VII Porphyrogenitus wrote around 950 that Fajsz, Taksony's cousin, was grand prince of the Hungarians at that time.

In that time Taxis, king of the Hungarians came to Italy with a large army. Berengar gave him ten measures of coins not from his own money, but from an exaction on the churches and paupers.

— Liudprand of Cremona: Retribution

== Reign ==
A later source, Johannes Aventinus, writes that Taksony fought in the Battle of Lechfeld on August 10, 955. There, future Holy Roman Emperor Otto I routed an 8,000-strong Hungarian army. If this report is reliable, Taksony was one of the few Hungarian leaders to survive the battlefield. Modern historians, including Zoltán Kordé and Gyula Kristó, suggest that Fajsz abdicated in favor of Taksony around that time. After that battle the Hungarians' plundering raids in Western Europe stopped, and they were forced to retreat from the lands between the Enns and Traisen rivers. However, the Hungarians continued their incursions into the Byzantine Empire until the 970s.

According to the Gesta Hungarorum, "a great host of Muslims" arrived in Hungary "from the land of Bular" under Taksony. The contemporaneous Ibrahim ibn Yaqub also recorded the presence of Muslim merchants from Hungary in Prague in 965. Anonymus also writes of the arrival of Pechenegs during Taksony's reign; he granted them "a land to dwell in the region of Kemej as far as the Tisza". The only sign of a Hungarian connection with Western Europe under Taksony is a report by Liudprand of Cremona. He writes about Zacheus, whom Pope John XII consecrated bishop and "sent to the Hungarians in order to preach that they should attack" the Germans in 963. However, there is no evidence that Zacheus ever arrived in Hungary. Taksony arranged the marriage of his elder son Géza to Sarolt, daughter of Gyula of Transylvania, before his death during the early 970s.

== Family ==
Taksony's marriage to a woman "from the land of the Cumans" was arranged by his father, according to the Gesta Hungarorum. Although this reference to the Cumans is anachronistic, modern historians argue that the Gesta seems to have preserved the memory of the Turkic—Khazar, Pecheneg or Volga Bulgarian—origin of Taksony's wife. Historian György Györffy proposes that a Pecheneg chieftain, Tonuzoba, who received estates from Taksony near the river Tisza, was related to Taksony's wife. The names of two of Taksony's sons (Géza and Michael) have been preserved. The following family tree presents Taksony's ancestry and his offspring.

Árpád	Menumorut*
Zoltán	daughter
Gyula of Transylvania	Taksony	a "Cuman" lady**
Sarolt	Géza	Michael
Kings of Hungary (till 1046)	a lady of the Tátony clan	Vazul	Ladislas the Bald	Premislava***
Kings of Hungary (from 1046)	Bonuzlo or Domoslav

*Whether Menumorut is an actual or an invented person is debated by modern scholars.
**A Khazar, Pecheneg or Volga Bulgarian woman
***Kristó writes that she may have been a member of the Rurik dynasty from Kievan Rus'.

== Sources ==
=== Primary sources ===
- Anonymus, Notary of King Béla: The Deeds of the Hungarians (Edited, Translated and Annotated by Martyn Rady and László Veszprémy) (2010). In: Rady, Martyn; Veszprémy, László; Bak, János M. (2010); Anonymus and Master Roger; CEU Press; ISBN 978-963-9776-95-1.
- Liudprand of Cremona: Retribution and King Otto (2007). In: The Complete Works of Liudprand of Cremona (Translated by Paolo Squatriti); The Catholic University of Press; ISBN 978-0-8132-1506-8.

=== Secondary sources ===
- Berend, Nora (2006). At the Gate of Christendom: Jews, Muslims and "Pagans" in Medieval Hungary, c. 1000-c.1300. Cambridge University Press. ISBN 978-0-521-02720-5.
- Berend, Nora; Laszlovszky, József; Szakács, Béla Zsolt (2007). "The kingdom of Hungary". In Berend, Nora (ed.). Christianization and the Rise of Christian Monarchy: Scandinavia, Central Europe and Rus', c.900–1200. Cambridge University Press. pp. 319–368. ISBN 978-0-521-87616-2.
- Engel, Pál (2001). The Realm of St Stephen: A History of Medieval Hungary, 895–1526. I.B. Tauris Publishers. ISBN 1-86064-061-3.
- Györffy, György (1994). King Saint Stephen of Hungary. Atlantic Research and Publications. ISBN 978-0-88033-300-9.
- Györffy, György (2002). A magyarok elődeiről és a honfoglalásról: kortársak és krónikások hiradásai [=On the Forefathers of the Hungarians and their Conquest of the Carpathian Basin: Reports by Contemporaries and Chroniclers] (in Hungarian). Osiris Kiadó. ISBN 963-389-272-4.
- Kordé, Zoltán (1994). "Taksony". In Kristó, Gyula; Engel, Pál; Makk, Ferenc (eds.). Korai magyar történeti lexikon (9–14. század) [=Encyclopedia of the Early Hungarian History (9th–14th centuries)] (in Hungarian). Akadémiai Kiadó. p. 659. ISBN 963-05-6722-9.
- Kristó, Gyula; Makk, Ferenc (1996). Az Árpád-ház uralkodói [=Rulers of the House of Árpád] (in Hungarian). I.P.C. Könyvek. ISBN 963-7930-97-3.
- Madgearu, Alexandru (2005). The Romanians in the Anonymous Gesta Hungarorum: Truth and Fiction. Romanian Cultural Institute, Center for Transylvanian Studies. ISBN 973-7784-01-4.
- Spinei, Victor (2003). The Great Migrations in the East and South East of Europe from the Ninth to the Thirteenth Century. Romanian Cultural Institute (Center for Transylvanian Studies) and Museum of Brăila Istros Publishing House. ISBN 973-85894-5-2.
- Tóth, Sándor László (1994). "Zaltas". In Kristó, Gyula; Engel, Pál; Makk, Ferenc (eds.). Korai magyar történeti lexikon (9–14. század) [=Encyclopedia of the Early Hungarian History (9th–14th centuries)] (in Hungarian). Akadémiai Kiadó. p. 741. ISBN 963-05-6722-9.

Taksony of Hungary House of Árpád Born: before or around 931 Died: early 970s
Regnal titles
Preceded by Fajsz	Grand Prince of the Hungarians c. 955 – early 970s	Succeeded by Géza
