= Géza, Grand Prince of the Hungarians =

Grand Prince of the Hungarians from the early 970s to 997

Géza
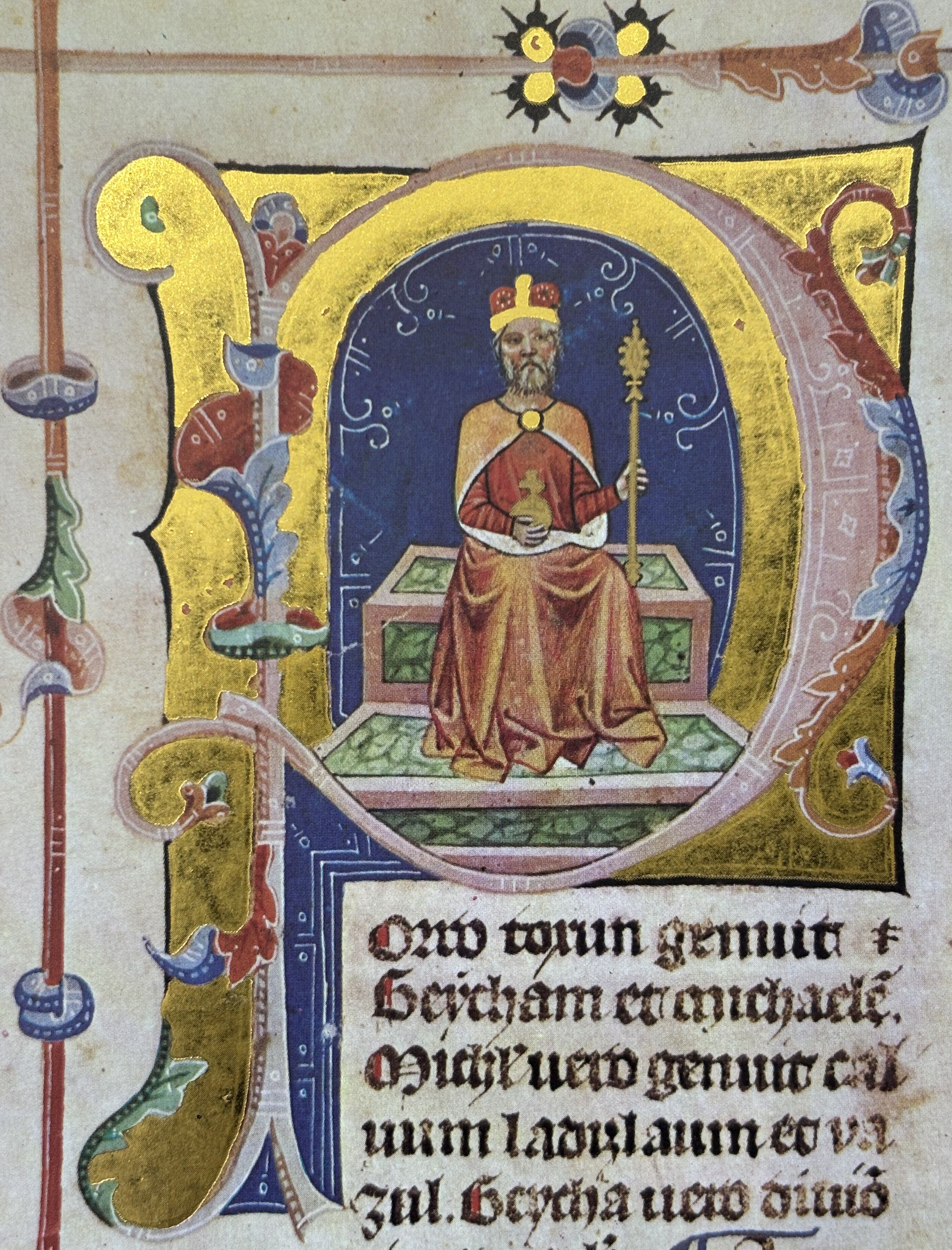
- Depicted in the Illuminated Chronicle

Grand Prince of the Hungarians
- Reign: early 970s – 997
- Predecessor: Taksony
- Successor: Stephen
- Born: c. 940
- Died: 997
- Spouse: Sarolt of Transylvania; Adelaide (Adleta) of Poland (?)
- Issue: Judith; Margaret; Stephen I of Hungary; Grimelda, Dogaressa of Venice
- Dynasty: Árpád dynasty
- Father: Taksony
- Religion: Chalcedonian Christianity-Hungarian paganism syncretism

Géza (c. 940 – 997), also Gejza, was Grand Prince of the Hungarians from the early 970s. He was the son of Grand Prince Taksony and his Oriental—Khazar, Pecheneg or Volga Bulgarian—wife. He married Sarolt, a daughter of an Eastern Orthodox Hungarian chieftain. After ascending the throne, Géza made peace with the Holy Roman Empire. Within Hungary, he consolidated his authority with extreme cruelty, according to the unanimous narration of nearly contemporaneous sources. He was the first Hungarian monarch to support Christian missionaries from Western Europe. Although he was baptised (his baptismal name was Stephen), his Christian faith remained shallow and he continued to perform acts of pagan worship. He was succeeded by his son Stephen, who was crowned the first King of Hungary in 1000 or 1001.

== Early life ==
Géza was the elder son of Taksony, Grand Prince of the Hungarians. His mother was his father's wife "from the land of the Cumans", according to the anonymous author of the Gesta Hungarorum. This anachronistic reference to the Cumans suggests that she was of Khazar, Pecheneg or Volga Bulgarian origin. The Byzantine Emperor Constantine VII Porphyrogenitus, who listed the descendants of Grand Prince Árpád around 950, did not mention Géza. Even so, Gyula Kristó wrote that Géza was born around 940 and the emperor ignored him because of his youth. The genuine form of his name was either "Gyeücsa" or "Gyeusa", which is possibly a diminutive form of the Turkic title yabgu. Géza's father arranged his marriage with Sarolt—a daughter of a Hungarian chieftain called Gyula, who ruled Transylvania independently of the grand prince and had converted to Christianity in Constantinople. Sarolt seems to have also adhered to Eastern Orthodox Christianity, according to Bruno of Querfurt's remark on her "languid and muddled Christianity".

== Reign ==
Géza succeeded his father around 972. He adopted a centralizing policy, which gave rise to his fame as a merciless ruler. The longer version of his son's Life even states that Géza's hands were "defiled with blood". Pál Engel wrote that Géza carried out a "large-scale purge" against his relatives, which explains the lack of references to other members of the Árpád dynasty from around 972. Koppány, who continued to rule the southern parts of Transdanubia, is the only exception to this dearth of references. A marriage alliance between the German and Byzantine dynasties brought about a rapprochement between the two powers neighboring Hungary in 972. Géza decided to make peace with the Holy Roman Empire. First, a monk named Bruno sent by Otto I, Holy Roman Emperor arrived in Hungary around 972. Hungarian "legates" were present at a conference held by the emperor in Quedlinburg in 973.

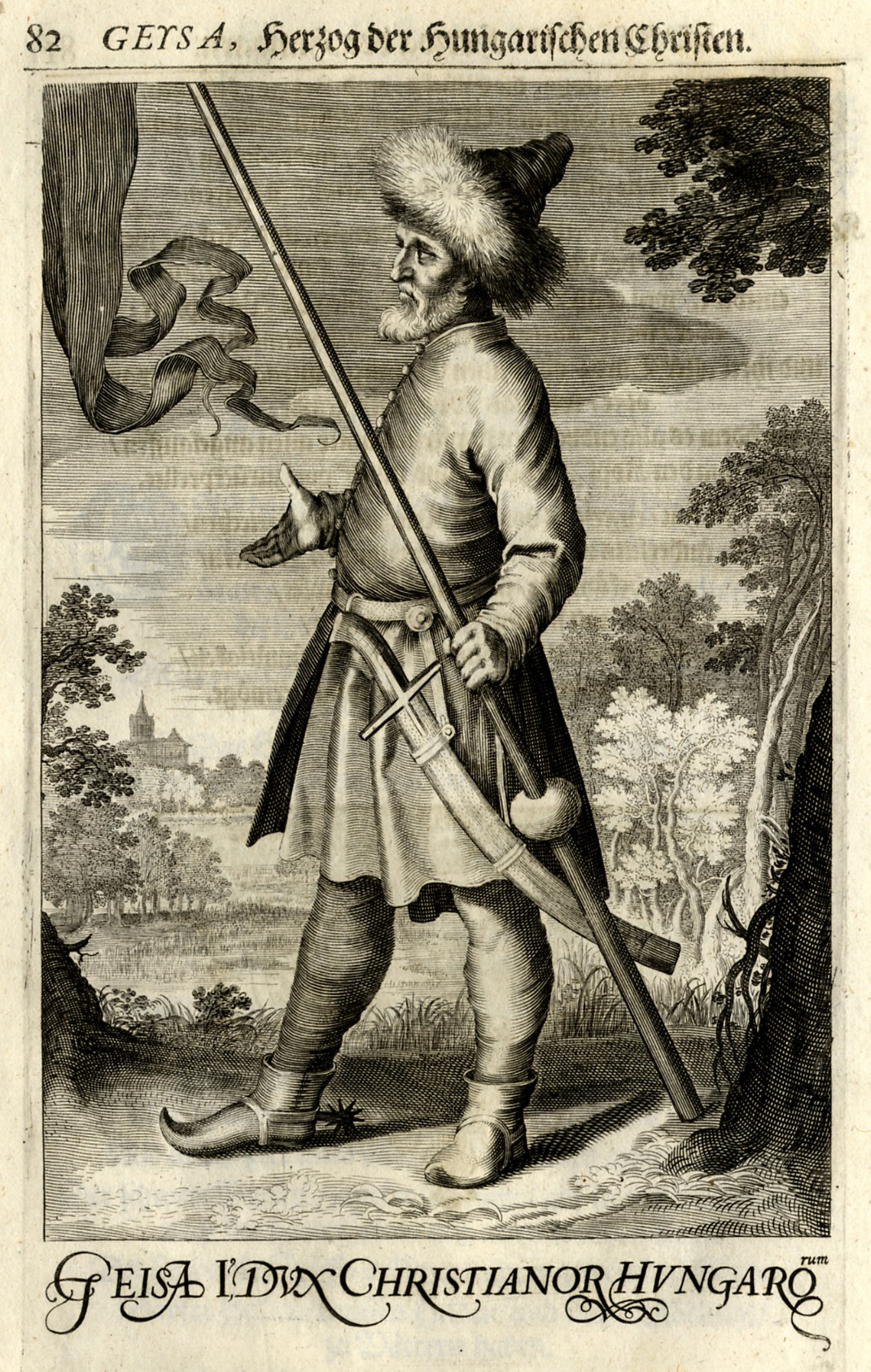
Géza, Grand Prince of Hungary (Nádasdy Mausoleum, 1664)

Geyza, who was strict and cruel, acting in a domineering way, as it were, with his own people, but compassionate and generous with strangers, especially with Christians, although [he was] still entangled in the rite of paganism. At the approach of the light of spiritual grace, he began to discuss peace attentively with all the neighboring provinces ... Moreover, he laid down a rule that the favor of hospitality and security be shown to all Christians wishing to enter his domains. He gave clerics and monks leave to enter his presence; he offered them a willing hearing, and delighted them in the germination of the seed of true faith sown in the garden of his heart.

— Hartvic: Life of King Stephen of Hungary

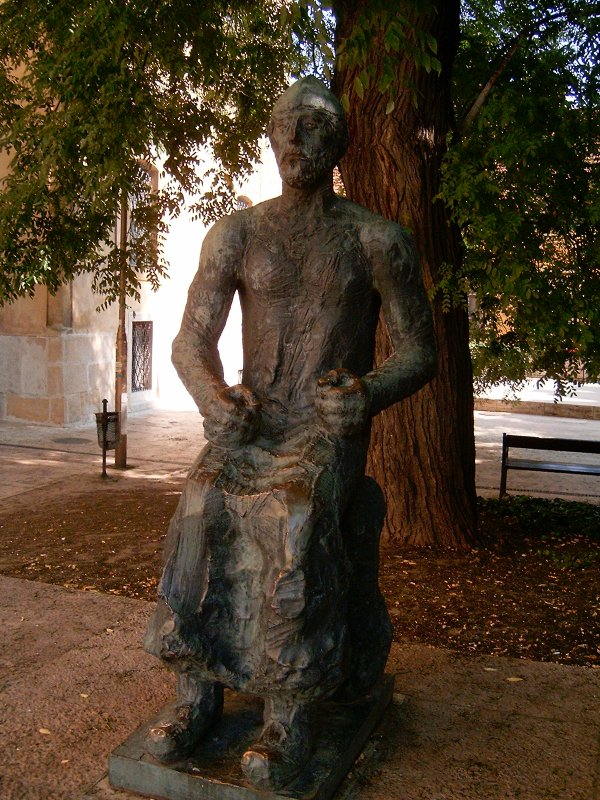
Statue of Grand Prince Géza in Székesfehérvár

A record on one Bishop Prunwart in the Abbey of Saint Gall mentions his success in baptising many Hungarians, including their "king". The nearly contemporaneous Thietmar of Merseburg confirms that the conversion to Christianity of the pagan Hungarians started under Géza, who became the first Christian ruler of Hungary. His baptismal name was Stephen. However, Géza continued to observe pagan cults, which proves that his conversion to Christianity was never complete. Kristó and other historians have said that the first Roman Catholic diocese in Hungary, with its seat in Veszprém, was set up in Géza's reign, but their view has not been unanimously accepted. A charter issued during his son's reign states that Géza was the founder of the Benedictine Pannonhalma Archabbey.

[Géza] was very cruel and killed many people because of his quick temper. When he became a Christian, however, he turned his rage against his reluctant subjects, in order to strengthen this faith. Thus, glowing with zeal for God, he washed away his old crimes. He sacrificed both to the omnipotent God and to various false gods. When reproached by his priest for doing so, however, he maintained that the practice had brought him both wealth and great power.

— Thietmar of Merseburg: Chronicum

Taking advantage of internal conflicts which emerged in the Holy Roman Empire after Emperor Otto II's death, Géza invaded Bavaria and took the fortress of Melk in 983. In 991, the Bavarians launched a counter-attack which forced Géza to withdraw Hungarian forces from the territories east of the Vienna Woods. Furthermore, he renounced the lands east of the river Leitha in his peace treaty of 996 with Henry IV of Bavaria. Géza also arranged the marriage of his son and heir Stephen to Henry IV's sister Giselle. Even before this marriage alliance, Géza convoked the Hungarian leaders to an assembly and forced them to take an oath confirming his son's right to succeed him.

== Family ==
Sarolt gave birth to at least three of Géza's children: Stephen, who succeeded his father on the throne, and two unnamed daughters. Sarolt survived Géza, which suggests that she was also the mother of Géza's daughters. Based on the Polish-Hungarian Chronicle, Szabolcs de Vajay wrote that the daughters' mother was Géza's alleged second wife Adelaide of Poland, but this has not been widely accepted. Adelaide is only mentioned in the Polish–Hungarian Chronicle, which describes her as the sister of Mieszko I of Poland, but specialists have often questioned her existence. The chronicle attributes Géza's conversion to Adelaide's influence.

The following family tree presents Géza's ancestry and his offspring.

Árpád	Menumorut*
Zoltán	daughter
Taksony of Hungary	a "Cuman" lady**
Sarolt	Géza	Michael
(1)
daughter (Judith?)	Boleslaus I of Poland*****	daughter	Gavril Radomir of Bulgaria	Kings of Hungary (from 1046)
(1)
Giselle of Bavaria	Stephen I of Hungary	daughter	Doge Otto Orseolo	daughter	Samuel of Hungary***
Emeric	Adalbert of Austria	Frowila	Peter of Hungary	Issue****

*Whether Menumorut is an actual or an invented person is debated by modern scholars.
**A Khazar or Pecheneg lady.
***Samuel Aba might have been Géza's grandson instead of his son-in-law.
****The Aba family descending from them still flourished in the 14th century.

***** Identity of Boleslaus I's spouse is debated

== Sources ==
=== Primary sources ===
- Hartvic, Life of King Stephen of Hungary (Translated by Nora Berend) (2001). In: Head, Thomas (2001); Medieval Hagiography: An Anthology; Routledge; ISBN 0-415-93753-1.
- Ottonian Germany: The Chronicon of Thietmar of Merseburg (Translated and annotated by David A. Warner) (2001). Manchester University Press. ISBN 0-7190-4926-1.

=== Secondary sources ===
- Berend, Nora; Laszlovszky, József; Szakács, Béla Zsolt (2007). "The kingdom of Hungary". In Berend, Nora (ed.). Christianization and the Rise of Christian Monarchy: Scandinavia, Central Europe and Rus', c. 900-1200. Cambridge University Press. pp. 319–368. ISBN 978-0-521-87616-2.
- Engel, Pál (2001). The Realm of St Stephen: A History of Medieval Hungary, 895–1526. I.B. Tauris Publishers. ISBN 1-86064-061-3.
- Homza, Martin (2017). Mulieres suadentes - Persuasive Women: Female Royal Saints in Medieval East Central and Eastern Europe. BRILL. ISBN 978-90-04-31466-5.
- Kirschbaum, Stanislav J. (1995). A History of Slovakia: The Struggle for Survival. Palgrave Macmillan. ISBN 963-482-113-8.
- Kontler, László (1999). Millennium in Central Europe: A History of Hungary. Atlantisz Publishing House. ISBN 963-9165-37-9.
- Kristó, Gyula; Makk, Ferenc (1996). Az Árpád-ház uralkodói [=Rulers of the House of Árpád] (in Hungarian). I.P.C. Könyvek. ISBN 963-7930-97-3.
- Kristó, Gyula (1994). "Géza". In Kristó, Gyula; Engel, Pál; Makk, Ferenc (eds.). Korai magyar történeti lexikon (9–14. század) [=Encyclopedia of the Early Hungarian History (9th-14th centuries)] (in Hungarian). Akadémiai Kiadó. p. 235. ISBN 963-05-6722-9.
- Macartney, C. A. (1953). The Medieval Hungarian Historians: A Critical & Analytical Guide. Cambridge University Press. ISBN 978-0-521-08051-4.
- Molnár, Miklós (2001). A Concise History of Hungary. Cambridge University Press. ISBN 978-0-521-66736-4.
- Sălăgean, Tudor (2005). "Romanian Society in the Early Middle Ages (9th–14th Centuries AD)". In Pop, Ioan-Aurel; Bolovan, Ioan (eds.). History of Romania: Compendium. Romanian Cultural Institute (Center for Transylvanian Studies). pp. 133–207. ISBN 978-973-7784-12-4.

Géza, Grand Prince of the Hungarians House of Árpád Born: c. 940 Died: 997
Regnal titles
Preceded by Taksony	Grand Prince of the Hungarians early 970s – 997	Succeeded by Stephen I (Vajk)
