= Family tree of Hungarian monarchs =

This family tree of the Kings of Hungary includes only kings of Hungary and their descendants who are relevant to the succession.

Ügyek
Álmos
Árpád
Jutotzas	Zoltán
Fajsz	Taksony
(d. 997); Géza	Mihály
(d. 1038); Stephen I r. 1000-1038	Grimelda	[?] Sarolta	(d. 1044); Samuel r. 1041-1044	Vazul
Árpád	Aba
Peter r. 1038-1041, 1044-1046	Andrew I r. 1046-1060	(d. 1063); Béla I r. 1060-1063
Orseolo
(1053-1087); Solomon r. 1063-1074	(d. 1077); Géza I r. 1074-1077	(d. 1095); Ladislaus I r. 1077-1095
(d. 1116); Coloman r. 1096-1116	(d. 1127); Álmos
(b. 1110); Stephen II r. 1116-1131	(d. 1141); Béla II r. 1131-1141
(1130-1162); Géza II r. 1141-1162	(1131-1163); Ladislaus II r. 1162-1163	(d. 1165); Stephen IV r. 1163
(1147-1172); Stephen III r. 1162-1172	(d. 1196); Béla III r. 1172-1196
(1174-1204); Emeric r. 1196-1204	(d. 1235); Andrew II r. 1205-1235
(d. 1205); Ladislaus III r. 1204-1205	(1206-1270); Béla IV r. 1235-1270	(1235-1271); István
(d. 1302); Konstancia	(b. 1226); Anna	(1236-1271); Erzsébet	(1239-1272); Stephen V r. 1270-1272	(d. 1301); Andrew III r. 1290-1301
(1252-1308); Yuri	(1245-1285); Kunigunda	(1261-1312); Otto r. 1305-1307	(1257-1323); Mária	(1262-1290); Ladislaus IV r. 1272-1290
Wittelsbach
(d. 1364); Anastasia	(1271-1305); Václav	(1272-1299); Margherita	(1271-1295); Carlo Martello	(1294-1336); Giovanni	(1289-1341); Eleonora
(d. 1391); Uliana	(1289-1306); Wenceslaus r. 1301-1305	(1292–1330); Eliška	(d. 1352); Jeanne	(1288-1342); Charles I r. 1308-1342	(1324-1362); Luigi	(1304-1342); Pietro
Přemyslid	Anjou
(d. 1434); Aleksandra	(d. 1434); Jogaila	(1316-1378); Karl	(1311-1356); Margaretha	(1326-1382); Louis I r. 1342-1382	(1345-1386); Charles II r. 1385-1386	(1325-1375); Elenora
(d. 1447); Eufemia	(1368-1437); Sigismund r. 1387-1437	(1336-1404); Albrecht	(1371-1395); Mary r. 1382-1385, 1386-1395	(1358-1382); Alionor
Luxembourg
(d. 1477); Przemysław	(d. 1410); Johanna Sophie	(1380-1416); Fernando
(1469-1521); Jadwiga	(1409-1442); Elisabeth	(1397-1439); Albert r. 1437-1439	(1398-1479); Juan	(1396-1458); Alfonso
Habsburg
(1424-1444); Vladislaus I r. 1440-1444	(1427-1492); Kazimierz	(d. 1505); Elisabeth	(1440-1457); Ladislaus V r. 1444-1457	(1452-1516); Fernando	(1424-1494); Ferdinando
Jagiellon
(1467-1548); Zygmunt	(1456-1516); Vladislaus II r. 1490-1516	(1479-1555); Juana	(1443-1490); Matthias I r. 1458-1490	(1457-1508); Beatrice
Hunyadi
(1487-1540); John I r. 1526-1540	(1519-1559); Izabela	(1506-1526); Louis II r. 1516-1526	(1503-1547); Anna	(1503-1564); Ferdinand I r. 1526-1564
Zápolya	Habsburg
(1540-1571); John II r. 1540-1551, 1556-1570	(1527-1576); Maximilian r. 1564-1576	(1540-1590); Karl
(1552-1612); Rudolf r. 1576-1608	(1557-1619); Matthias II r. 1612-1619	(1578-1637); Ferdinand II r. 1619-1637
(1608-1657); Ferdinand III r. 1625-1657
(1633-1654); Ferdinand IV r. 1647-1654	(1640-1705); Leopold I r. 1655-1705
(1678-1711); Joseph I r. 1687-1711	(1685-1740); Charles III r. 1711-1740
(1717-1780); Maria Theresa r. 1740-1780
(1741-1790); Joseph II r. 1780-1790	(1747-1792); Leopold II r. 1790-1792
Habsburg- Lorraine
(1768-1835); Francis r. 1792-1835
(1793-1875); Ferdinand V r. 1835-1848	(1802-1878); Franz Karl
(1830-1916); Francis Joseph r. 1848-1916	(1833-1896); Karl Ludwig
(1865–1906); Otto
(1887-1922); Charles IV r. 1916-1918

== See also ==
- List of Hungarian monarchs
- King of Hungary
- Holy Crown of Hungary
