= Grimelda of Hungary =

Hungarian noblewoman and a dogaressa of Venice

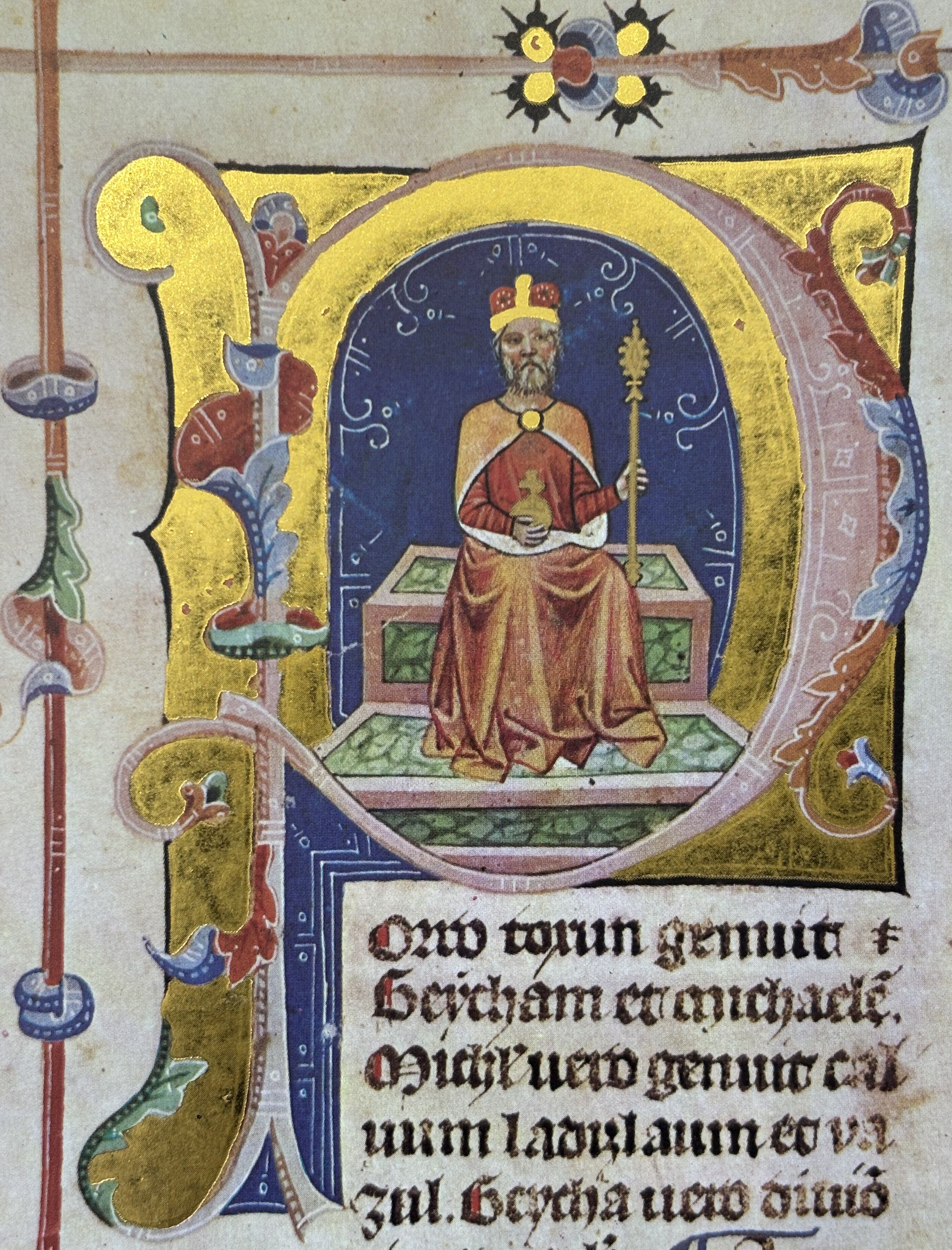
Grimelda's father, Géza, Grand Prince of the Hungarians (Illuminated Chronicle)

Grimelda of Hungary was a Hungarian princess and a Dogaressa of Venice by marriage to Doge Otto Orseolo (r. 1009—1026). She was the daughter of Géza, Grand Prince of the Hungarians and Princess Sarolt.

Grimelda married the Doge Otto Orseolo (r. 1009—1026). She followed Otto to Constantinople after his deposition. Otto and Grimelda’s children were Peter, King of Hungary and Frozza Orseolo.

Preceded by Maria Candiano	Dogaressa of Venice; 1009–1026	Theodora Doukaina Selvo
