= Polish–Hungarian Chronicle =

The Polish–Hungarian Chronicle or Hungarian–Polish Chronicle (from Latin: Chronicon Hungarico-Polonicum) is a medieval Latin chronicle which exists in two redactions in five manuscripts kept in Polish libraries, including the Zamojski Codex from the second half of the 14th century and its 15th-century copy. Its full title is Chronicle of the Hungarians Attached to and Mixed with Chronicles of the Poles, and the Life of Saint Stephen (Cronica Ungarorum juncta et mixta cum cronicis Polonorum, et vita sancti Stephani). According to the Hungarian historian György Györffy, it "contains a fair number of absurdities".

The original chronicle was probably composed in the 1220s or 1230s at the court of Duke Coloman of Slavonia, the deposed King of Galicia and Lodomeria. The original manuscript was taken to Poland by Coloman's widow, Salomea, after 1241. It tells the story of the Hungarians from the reign of "Aquila" (Attila the Hun) to that of Ladislaus I.

== Sources ==
- Grzesik, Ryszard (2003). "Sources of a Story About the Murdered Croatian King in the Hungarian–Polish Chronicle". Povijesni prilozi. 24: 97–104.
- Grzesik, Ryszard (2012). "Chronicon Hungarico-Polonicum". In Graeme Dunphy (ed.). Encyclopedia of the Medieval Chronicle. Brill Online.
- Györffy, György (1994). King Saint Stephen of Hungary. Atlantic Research and Publications. ISBN 0-88033-300-6.
- Macartney, C. A. (1953). The Medieval Hungarian Historians: A Critical and Analytical Guide. Cambridge University Press. ISBN 978-0-521-08051-4.
- Steinhübel, Ján (2011). "The Duchy of Nitra". In Teich, Mikuláš; Kováč, Dušan; Brown, Martin D. (eds.). Slovakia in History. Cambridge University Press. pp. 15–29. ISBN 978-0-521-80253-6.
