= Menumorut =

Legendary ruler of the lands between the rivers Mureș, Someș and Tisza around 900 AD

Menumorut or Menumorout (Modern Hungarian: Ménmarót) was the ruler of the lands between the rivers Mureș, Someș and Tisza at the time of the Hungarian conquest of the Carpathian Basin around 900, according to the Gesta Hungarorum, a Hungarian chronicle written after 1150 by an unidentified author, referred to as Anonymus. Historians debate whether Menumorut was an actual ruler or a fictional character created by the author, since the Gesta tells of multiple figures, including Menumorut, who are not identified in any other primary sources, and does not name any of the enemies of the invading Hungarians written of in other contemporary accounts of the invasion. According to Anonymus, Menumorut's duchy was populated primarily with Khazars and Székelys, and he acknowledged the suzerainty of the (unnamed) ruling Byzantine Emperor at the time.

== Background ==
=== Early history of the Magyars ===
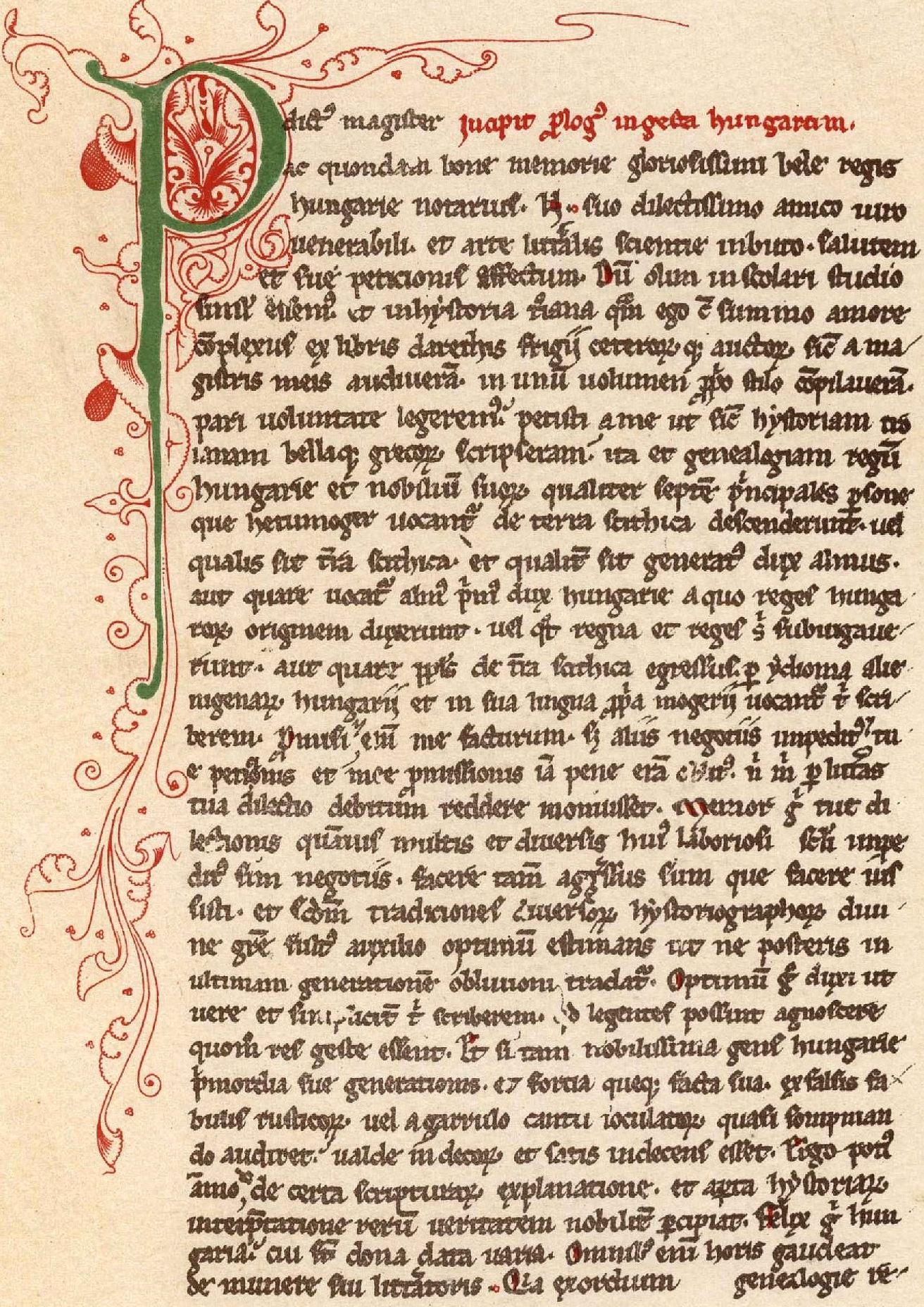
The first page of the sole manuscript preserving the text of the Gesta Hungarorum, the only chronicle which mentions Menumorut

The most important source of the Magyars' early history is a work known as De Administrando Imperio, written by the Byzantine Emperor Constantine VII around 952. According to the emperor, the Magyars "lived together with" the Khazars "for three years, and fought in alliance" with them for an unspecified time. The text suggests that the Magyars were once subjected to the Khazar Khaganate, the dominant power of the lands between the rivers Dnieper and Volga, but modern historians debate whether their subjection lasted only for a couple of years, as the emperor states, or for a longer period. In the same area, three or four local variants of the Saltovo-Mayaki archaeological culture, which represented semi-nomadic groups, emerged in the western regions of the Eurasian steppes in the second half of the 8th century.

Internal strife and attacks by neighboring tribes caused the decline of the Khaganate in the early 9th century. The Magyars were among the Khazars' subject peoples who seceded, settling in the Pontic steppes to the north of the Black Sea. According to Emperor Constantine VII, the Kabars, who "were of the race" of the Khazars, also rebelled against the Khaganate and joined the Magyars. This event occurred before 881, because in that year the Magyars and the Kabars invaded East Francia, according to the longer version of the Annals of Salzburg. The Magyars also intervened in a war between Bulgaria and the Byzantine Empire on the latter's behalf in about 894. The Bulgarians formed an alliance with the Pechenegs, who dwelled in the lands east of the Magyars, and they jointly invaded the Pontic steppes and defeated the Magyars, forcing them to move to the Carpathian Basin in search for a new homeland.

Their conquest of the Carpathian Basin is the principal subject of the Gesta Hungarorum. The Gesta was written after 1150 by an unidentified author, who is referred to as Anonymus in modern scholars' works. He wrote primarily of the Magyars' battles with six local rulers, including Menumorut, who are not named in other annals and chronicles. On the other hand, Anonymus did not write of Svatopluk I of Moravia, Luitpold of Bavaria, and other local rulers whose fights with the conquering Magyars were described in late 9th-century or early 10th-century sources.

=== Crișana on the eve of the Hungarian Conquest ===
Burial sites unearthed at Valea lui Mihai and other sites along the Ier River containing remains of horses show that the Avars settled in Crișana shortly after their arrival in the Carpathian Basin in 567. However, few belt mounts decorated with griffins and tendrils or other such features of later Avar craftsmanship have been found in the same region. A distinct group of barrow cemeteries, or tumuli—the so-called "Nușfalău–Someșeni" cemeteries—appeared in the lands bordering on "Late Avar" cemeteries in the 8th century. In contrast with the Avars, who practised inhumation, the populations using these cemeteries cremated their dead. "Nușfalău–Someșeni" cemeteries show similarities to some in the East Slavic territories, but they yielded items similar to examples unearthed in West Slavic sites and to "Late Avar" belt mounts.

The Avars' power collapsed after Charlemagne and his commanders launched a series of campaigns against the western regions of the Carpathian Basin between 788 and 803. However, Avar groups survived the destruction of their empire: Regino of Prüm wrote that the Magyars first "roamed the wildernesses of the Pannonians and the Avars" in the Carpathian Basin after their flight from the Pontic steppes. According to historian András Róna-Tas, these wildernesses of the Avars (solitudo Avarorum) were situated in the plains along the rivers Tisza and Danube, including Crișana.

The collapse of the Avar Khaganate enabled the development of "Great" Moravia, a Slavic polity which emerged in the region of the Middle Danube. Svatopluk I of Moravia, who reigned from 870 to 894, expanded his authority over a large region. Svatopluk's empire included Crişana, according to historian Gyula Kristó, since Emperor Constantine's reference to "great Moravia, the unbaptized" describes the rivers Timiș, Mureș, Criș, Tisza and Toutis as within its territory. Archaeologist Alexandru Madgearu rejects Kristó's theory, because no archaeological finds from the late 9th century evidence Moravian influence in Crișana.

The Bulgarians also benefited from the fall of the Avar Khaganate. One of the military commanders of Omurtag of Bulgaria drowned in the Tisza, showing that Omurtag, who ruled between 814 and 831, attempted to expand his authority towards this river. The Bulgarians allied with the Franks and invaded Moravia in both 863 and 883. Based on sources from around 870, the Persian scholar Gardizi wrote of two peoples, the Nandarin and the Mirdāt, whose lands were ten days' journey apart. Historians István Bóna and György Györffy identify the Nandarins as Bulgarians (because nándor was the Hungarian exonym for the Bulgarians), and the Mirdāt as Moravians. If their identifications are valid, the distance between Bulgaria and Moravia was about 250 to 300 kilometres (160 to 190 mi) circa 870.

== Anonymus's narration ==
=== Menumorut and his duchy ===
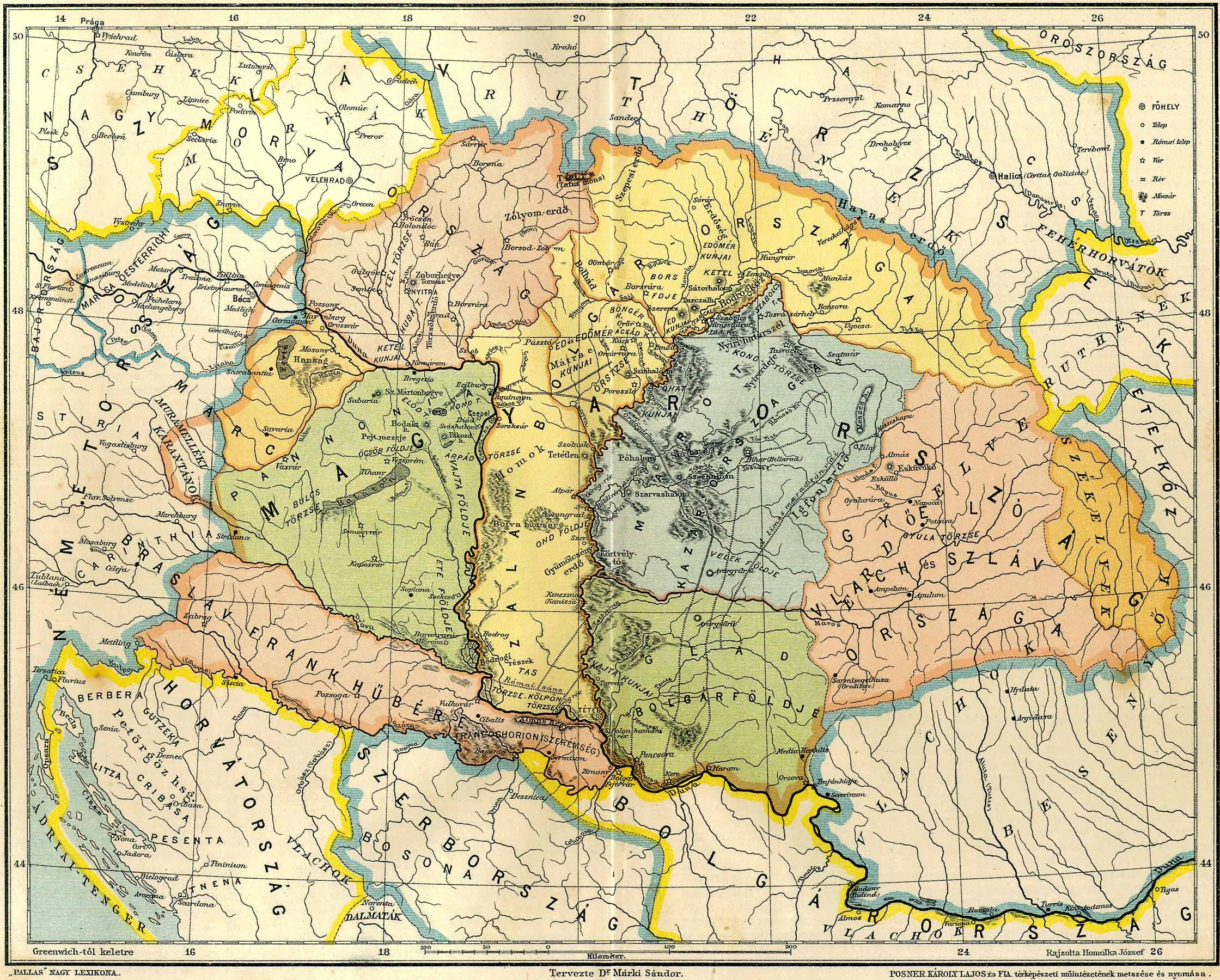
Menumorut's duchy ("Kazárország" or Khazars' Land) on a Hungarian map (from the 1890s) based on the Gesta Hungarorum

Menumorut ruled an area bordered by the rivers Tisza, Mureș, Someș, and the Igyfon Wood at the time of the Magyars' invasion, according to the Gesta Hungarorum. Anonymus also wrote that "the peoples that are called Kozár", identified by historians as Khazars, inhabited this realm, together with the Székelys. Menumorut's main fortress was located at Biharia, according to Anonymus. An early medieval fortress was found here, and some historians (including Sălăgean) have identified it as Menumorut's capital, although others (for instance, Florin Curta) argue that nothing proves that the fortress was built before the 10th century. Anonymus wrote that Menumorut was the grandson of one "Prince Marót" (whose name was derived from the ancient Hungarian exonym for the Moravians), who he states was ruler of Crișana in the times of Attila the Hun. According to the Gesta, Menumorut communicated "haughtily with a Bulgarian heart" with the Magyars' envoys, informing them that "the emperor of Constantinople" was his lord.

The Gesta describes Menumorut as a polygamist, stating that he "had many concubines". Anonymus even suggested that Menumorut's name was connected to the Hungarian word for stallion (mén) because of his womanizing nature. According to historian Neagu Djuvara, Menumorut's name is a Hungarian form of a Turkic (possibly Bulgar) proper name, but he does not give a suggestion.

=== The Hungarian conquest ===
The Magyars entered the Carpathian Basin through the Northern Carpathians, according to the Gesta Hungarorum. After conquering the northeastern region, their leader, Grand Prince Árpád, sent two envoys, Ősbő and Velek, to Menumorut, demanding "the land from the Someș River to the border of Nyírség, up to the Meseș Gates". Menumorut received Árpád's envoys amicably, but refused to yield, stating that the Byzantine Emperor guaranteed him rule over the land. Ősbő and Velek returned to Árpád and informed him of Menumorut's refusal.

Árpád dispatched three commanders, Tas, Szabolcs, and Tétény, to invade Menumorut's duchy, according to Anonymus. They crossed the Tisza "at the ford of Lád" and marched towards the Someș. They halted at a place near the future village of Szabolcs, where "almost all the inhabitants of the land surrendered of their own will", giving their sons as hostages to them. Menomorut did not dare to launch a counter-attack, since more and more of his subjects were voluntarily yielding to the Magyar leaders. Upon Szabolcs's orders, an earthen fortress was built, which was named after him, and the three Magyar commanders "appointed from among the inhabitants of the land many serving men to that castle" and manned the fortress with Magyar warriors under the command of a lieutenant.

After this, Anonymus continues, a division of the Magyar army advanced towards the Meseș Gates, under the command of Szabolcs and Tas, and occupied the fortress of Satu Mare, while a second division, led by Tétény, "conquered a great number of people" in the Nyírség. The two divisions rejoined at the Meseș Gates, where "the dwellers of the land built stone gateways and a great obstacle of trees" in accordance with the Magyar leaders' orders to defend the borders of their newly conquered lands. Anonymus emphasizes that the three Magyar commanders were very proud that "they had subjected almost all the nations" of Menumorut's duchy. Tas and Szabolcs decided to return to Árpád, "subduing the whole people from the Someș River to the Criș River" on their way. Menumorut was at this point planning to escape to the Byzantine Empire, but his warriors prevented Szabolcs and Tas from crossing the Criş at Szeghalom, thus forcing the Magyars to temporarily retreat.

After the first campaign against Menumorut, the Magyars fought with Salan (who was the lord of the lands between the Tisza and the Danube), with the Bohemians, and with Glad (the lord of the Banat), and conquered Pannonia, according to the Gesta. Árpád once again dispatched Ősbő and Velek, at the head of a new army, against Menumorut's remaining lands after the birth of his son, Zoltán. Ősbő and Velek crossed the Tisza and halted at the river Kórógy, where the Székelys, "who were previously the peoples" of Attila the Hun, according to Anonymus, voluntarily joined them. Their united armies crossed the Criş River and encamped on the banks of one of its tributaries. Their arrival frightened Menumorut, who left "a host of warriors" in Biharia and "betook himself and his wife and daughter to the groves" of the Igyfon Wood. Ősbő and Velek laid siege to Biharia, which was defended by "warriors gathered from diverse nations", for twelve days. During the siege, twenty Magyar, fifteen Székely warriors, and 125 of Menumorut's soldiers were killed. On the 13th day, after the besiegers made preparations for putting ladders to the wall, the defenders decided to surrender, and opened the gates of the fortress.

Having been informed of the fall of his capital, Anonymus continues, Menumorut surrendered and agreed to give his daughter in marriage to Zoltán. Árpád accepted this offer, allowing Menumorut to continue his rule over Biharia till the end of his life. Árpád "gave the county of Zaránd" to Velek, and the fortress of Veszprém to Ősbő, in reward for their services during the war against Menumorut. Menumorut "died without a son" not long before 907, leaving "his whole kingdom in peace" to his son-in-law, Zoltán.

== Assessment of Historians ==
Many historians debate the reliability of the reports of the Gesta concerning Menumorut and the other opponents of the Magyars who are not named in other primary sources. Kristó writes that Anonymus, who had little information of the real conditions of the Carpathian Basin around 900, could only turn "to one thing when he outlined the history of the Hungarian conquest: his own imagination," and György Györffy says that Menumorut was one of the personalities whom Anonymus invented and named after a location. The existence of two villages named "Morut's house" (Marótlaka in Hungarian) and a clan Morut in Bihar County in the 13th century is well-documented, proving that at least one Morut had settled in this region. Carlile Aylmer Macartney writes that the majority of events that the Gesta mentions in connection with Menumorut are "a simple repetition, with variants" of the story of Salan in the same chronicle, showing that Anonymus "had little material on which to work" when writing about Menumorut. Historian Ryszard Grzesik says that Menumorut "never existed and never ruled over Bihar", but "it was not an invented person".

== See also ==
- Gelou
- Glad (duke)
- Laborec
- Romania in the Early Middle Ages

== Sources ==
=== Primary sources ===
- Anonymus, Notary of King Béla: The Deeds of the Hungarians (Edited, Translated and Annotated by Martyn Rady and László Veszprémy) (2010). In: Rady, Martyn; Veszprémy, László; Bak, János M. (2010); Anonymus and Master Roger; CEU Press; ISBN 978-963-9776-95-1.
- Constantine Porphyrogenitus: De Administrando Imperio (Greek text edited by Gyula Moravcsik, English translation b Romillyi J. H. Jenkins) (1967). Dumbarton Oaks Center for Byzantine Studies. ISBN 0-88402-021-5.
- The Chronicle of Regino of Prüm (2009). In: History and Politics in Late Carolingian and Ottonian Europe: The Chronicle of Regino of Prüm and Adalbert of Magdeburg (Translated and annotated by Simon MacLean); Manchester University Press; ISBN 978-0-7190-7135-5.

=== Secondary sources ===
- Barford, P. M. (2001). The Early Slavs: Culture and Society in Early Medieval Eastern Europe. Cornell University Press. ISBN 0-8014-3977-9.
- Boia, Lucian (2001). History and Myth in Romanian Consciousness (Translated by James Christian Brown). CEU Press. ISBN 963-9116-96-3.
- Bóna, István (1994). "The Hungarian–Slav Period (895–1172)". In Köpeczi, Béla; Barta, Gábor; Bóna, István; Makkai, László; Szász, Zoltán; Borus, Judit (eds.). History of Transylvania. Akadémiai Kiadó. pp. 109–177. ISBN 963-05-6703-2.
- Brook, Kevin Alan (2006). The Jews of Khazaria. Rowman & Littlefield. ISBN 978-0-7425-4982-1.
- Curta, Florin (2001). "Transylvania around A.D. 1000". In Urbańczyk, Przemysław (ed.). Europe around the year 1000. Wydawn. DiG. pp. 141–165. ISBN 978-837-1-8121-18.
- Djuvara, Neagu (2012). A Concise History of Romania. Cross Meridian. ISBN 978-1-4781-3204-2.
- Engel, Pál (2001). The Realm of St Stephen: A History of Medieval Hungary, 895–1526. I.B. Tauris Publishers. ISBN 1-86064-061-3.
- Gáll, Erwin (2013). Az Erdélyi-medence, a Partium és a Bánság 10-11. századi temetői [10th-11th-century Cemeteries from the Transylvanian Basin, the Partium and the Banat] (in Hungarian). Szegedi Tudományegyetem Régészeti Tanszéke, Magyar Nemzeti Múzeum, Magyar Tudományos Akadémia Bölcsészettudományi Kutatóközpont Régészeti Intézet. ISBN 978-963-306-197-8.
- Georgescu, Vlad (1991). The Romanians: A History. Ohio State University Press. ISBN 0-8142-0511-9.
- Grzesik, Ryszard (2016). "Blasi and Pastores Romanorum in the Gesta Hungarorum by an Anonymous Notary". Res Historica. 41: 25–34. doi:10.17951/rh.2016.0.25.
- Györffy, György (1988). Anonymus: Rejtély vagy történeti forrás [Anonymous: An Enigma or a Source for History] (in Hungarian). Akadémiai Kiadó. ISBN 963-05-4868-2.
- Kristó, Gyula (1996). Hungarian History in the Ninth Century. Szegedi Középkorász Muhely. ISBN 963-482-113-8.
- Kristó, Gyula (2003). Early Transylvania (895-1324). Lucidus Kiadó. ISBN 963-9465-12-7.
- Kordé, Zoltán (1994). "Ménmarót". In Kristó, Gyula; Engel, Pál; Makk, Ferenc (eds.). Korai magyar történeti lexikon (9–14. század) [Encyclopedia of the Early Hungarian History (9th–14th centuries)] (in Hungarian). Akadémiai Kiadó. p. 451. ISBN 963-05-6722-9.
- Macartney, C. A. (1953). The Medieval Hungarian Historians: A Critical & Analytical Guide. Cambridge University Press. ISBN 978-0-521-08051-4.
- Macartney, C. A. (1968). The Magyars in the Ninth Century. Cambridge University Press. ISBN 978-0-521-08070-5.
- Madgearu, Alexandru (2005). The Romanians in the Anonymous Gesta Hungarorum: Truth and Fiction. Romanian Cultural Institute, Center for Transylvanian Studies. ISBN 973-7784-01-4.
- Pop, Ioan-Aurel (1996). Romanians and Hungarians from the 9th to the 14th Century: The Genesis of the Transylvanian Medieval State. Centrul de Studii Transilvane, Fundația Culturală Română. ISBN 973-577-037-7.
- Róna-Tas, András (1999). Hungarians and Europe in the Early Middle Ages: An Introduction to Early Hungarian History (Translated by Nicholas Bodoczky). CEU Press. ISBN 978-963-9116-48-1.
- Sălăgean, Tudor (2005). "Romanian Society in the Early Middle Ages (9th–14th Centuries AD)". In Pop, Ioan-Aurel; Bolovan, Ioan (eds.). History of Romania: Compendium. Romanian Cultural Institute (Center for Transylvanian Studies). pp. 133–207. ISBN 978-973-7784-12-4.
- Sălăgean, Tudor (2016). Transylvania in the Second Half of the Thirteenth Century: The Rise of the Congregational System. ISBN 978-90-04-24362-0.
- Spinei, Victor (2003). The Great Migrations in the East and South East of Europe from the Ninth to the Thirteenth Century (Translated by Dana Bădulescu). ISBN 973-85894-5-2.
- Spinei, Victor (2009). The Romanians and the Turkic Nomads North of the Danube Delta from the Tenth to the Mid-Thirteenth century. Koninklijke Brill NV. ISBN 978-90-04-17536-5.
