= György Györffy =

Hungarian historian

- Born: Györffy György; 26 September 1917; Szucság, Hungary (today part of Baciu, Romania)
- Died: 19 December 2000 (aged 83); Budapest, Hungary
- Occupation: Historian
- Awards: Herder Prize (1988); Széchenyi Prize (1992)

György Györffy (26 September 1917 – 19 December 2000) was a Hungarian historian, and member of the Hungarian Academy of Sciences (Hungarian: MTA).

== Biography ==
Györffy was born in Szucság (Suceagu, today part of Baciu, Romania), Hungary the son of ethnographer István Györffy and Anna Papp. He finished his secondary schooling in the St. István Grammar School in 1935. Between 1935 and 1939 he studied at the Peter Pázmány University (now Eötvös Loránd University) under the historian Sándor Domanovszky, Elemér Mályusz, and the linguist and turkologist Gyula Németh.

Towards the end of this time he took a sabbatical around the Baltic Sea, Finland and Lapland. When he received the news of the start of World War II he returned to Hungary, arriving back in October 1939.

In June 1940, he was awarded a Doctorate in Hungarian Cultural History with his thesis "Besenyők és magyarok" ("Pechenegs and Hungarians").

From September 1940 until the end of 1941 he worked in the university library as a trainee. From 1942 he was a trainee in the Department of Historical Research within the Pál Teleki Scientific Institute, where he later became a lecturer. From 1945 to 1949 he was the Head of the Department of Ethnology at the Institute.

At the end of 1951 he received an offer for the position of Senior Lecturer at the University of Debrecen but he refused it because of the serious political situation in Hungary at that time.

At the Department of History of the Hungarian Academy of Sciences (MTA) he became a Fellow, a Senior Fellow and then a Consulting Fellow. In 1987 he started using a computer to ease editing his work. He used it to process details of Pozsony (Bratislava), but this work was left unfinished.

In 1988 he retired and became a Fellow Emeritus. He died in Budapest, aged 83.

== Awards ==
- 1952 – Kandidátus of Historical Science.
- 1969 – Doctor of Historical Science with his thesis A magyar várostörténet kezdetei és Budapest kialakulása ("Early History of Hungarian Cities and the Evolution of Budapest")
- 1988 – Herder Prize
- 1990 – Associate Member of the Hungarian Academy of Sciences
- 1991 – Member of the Hungarian Academy of Sciences
- 1992 – Széchenyi Prize
- 1997 – His work became a part of the Magyar Örökség ("Hungarian Heritage").

== Work ==
Györffy's work concentrates on Hungarian history, such as the Great Migration from the Far East into Hungary, the Árpád Dynasty, the exploration of the Far East, topography, and ancient given names and settlement names. He excelled in linguistics and was a Member of the Hungarian Academy of Sciences. He contributed to the Academy's learned journal Magyar Nyelv ("Hungarian Language").

In 1957 he introduced ideas that would later make up his magnum opus Az Árpád-kori Magyarország történeti földrajza. ("History of Hungarian Geography during the Árpád Dynasty"). In this work he recorded regional geographical names, settlement names, names of areas and borders, rivers, hills, forests and so on, and a great number of given names. He recorded the names in the original spelling. He recorded the names of trees in the border regions and other features of the landscape. His work is important in Hungarian linguistic studies.

== Selection of notable works on linguistics ==
(All works are in Hungarian; the translations of titles are not published English book titles.)

- Tanulmányok a magyar állam eredetéről. A nemzetségtől a vármegyéig, a törzstől az országig. Kurszán és Kurszán vára. ("Studies of the Evolution of Hungary. From Roots to Shire Counties, from Clans to Country. Lord Kurszán and his Castle.") Budapest, 1959.
- Az Árpád-kori Magyarország történeti földrajza. ("History of Hungarian Geography During the Árpád Dynasty.") I–IV. Budapest, 1963–1998.
- Napkelet felfedezése. Julianus, Plano Carpini és Rubruk útijelentései. ("Discovery of the Far East. Dispatches of Friar Julian, Plano Carpini and Rubruk.") Budapest, 1965.
- A magyarok elődeiről és a honfoglalásról. Kortársak és krónikások híradásai. ("Hungarian Ancestry and the Great Migration. Contemporary and Chroniclers' Dispatches.") 2nd edition, enlarged. Budapest, 1975.
- Julianus barát és Napkelet fölfedezése. ("Friar Julian and the Exploration of the Far East.") Budapest, 1986.
- Anonymus. Rejtély avagy történeti forrás? ("Anonymus. Mystery or Historical Resource?") Selected studies. Budapest, 1988.
- A magyarság keleti elemei. ("Eastern Hungarians.") Budapest, 1990.
- Krónikáink és a magyar őstörténet. Régi kérdések – új válaszok. ("Chroniclers and Hungarian History. Old Questions – New Answers.") Budapest, 1993.
- Pest-Buda kialakulása. Budapest története a honfoglalástól az Árpád-kor végi székvárossá emelkedéséig. ("Evolution of Pest and Buda. History of Budapest from the Great Migration until the End of the Árpád Dynasty.") Budapest, 1997.
- István király és műve. ("King Stephen and his work.") 3rd edition, enlarged and revised. Budapest, 2000.

== Sources ==
- Magyar nyelv ("Hungarian Language") (in Hungarian)
