= Emese =

9th century Hungarian figure

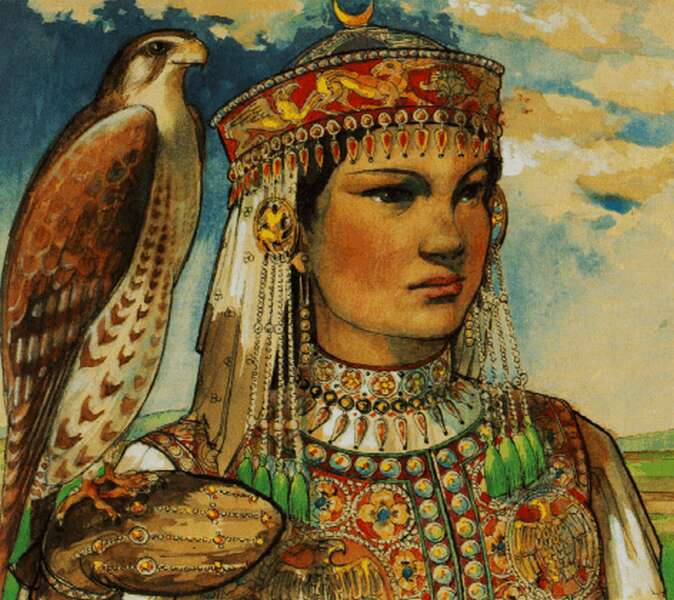
- Spouse: Ügyek or Előd
- Issue: Álmos
- House: House of Dentumoger
- Father: Eunedubelianus

Emese (fl. 9th century CE) was the daughter of Duke Eunedubelianus (Hungarian: Őnedbelia) of Dentumoger, the consort of the noblest Scythian (i.e. from Dentumoger, Scythia) prince Ügyek, and the mother of Grand Prince Álmos in Hungarian historical mythology; thus, she was the ancestress of the Hungarian royal house of Árpád, the dynasty which founded the Hungarian Kingdom. Due to a lack of reliable source material, it is difficult to separate the legends concerning Emese from her actual role as an historical person.

According to tradition, she is the mother of the Magyar royal dynasty, which sprang from one of the seven original Magyar tribes. Hence, she has been credited as "the mother of all ethnic Hungarians".

== Emese in legend ==
Emese's Dream, the legend concerning the conception of Prince Álmos, is one of the earliest known tales from Hungarian history. The legend can be tentatively dated to around 860-870, and with certainty to between 820 and 997 (the birth of Álmos and the acceptance of Christianity).

In the legend, Emese, the wife of Chief Ögyek (Ügek), was impregnated by a Turul bird. The Turul appeared to her in a dream and told her that from her womb a great river would begin, and flow out over strange lands. According to dream interpreters, this meant that she would give birth to a son who would lead his people out of their home in Levedia, and that her descendants would be glorious kings. Emese's son was named Álmos; his name derives from the Hungarian word álom, meaning dream, thus "Álmos" can be interpreted as "the Dreamt One".

The legend has several variants, namely regarding whether Emese was impregnated by the Turul bird or whether she was already pregnant at the time of her dream, and whether the bird appeared to her literally or in a dream while she was asleep. Some variations of the legend may have been introduced in the 19th century during the reemergence of Hungarian nationalism at that time.

"In the 819th year of Our Lord's incarnation, Ügyek, who, as we said above, being of the family of King Magog became a long time later the most noble prince of Scythia, took to wife in Dentumoger the daughter of Duke Eunedubelianus, called Emese, from whom he sired a son, who was named Álmos. But he is called Álmos from a divine event, because when she was pregnant a divine vision appeared to his mother in a dream in the form of a falcon that, as if coming to her, impregnated her and made known to her that from her womb a torrent would come forth and from her loins glorious kings be generated, but that they would not increase in their land. Because, therefore, a dream is called "álom" in the Hungarian language and his birth was predicted in a dream, so he was called Álmos. Or he is thus called Álmos, that is holy, because holy kings and dukes were born of his line."

— Anonymus: Gesta Hungarorum

"Ügyek's son Előd, fathered a son by the daughter of Eunodubilia in Scythian land, whose name was Álmos, because a bird in the shape of a falcon appeared in his mother's dream when she was pregnant, a rushing stream sprang from her womb, it grew, but not in its own land, and from this it was prophesied that glorious kings would come from her loins. Because dream is "álom" in our language, and the birth of that boy was prophesied by a dream, that's why he was called Álmos."

— Mark of Kalt: Chronicon Pictum

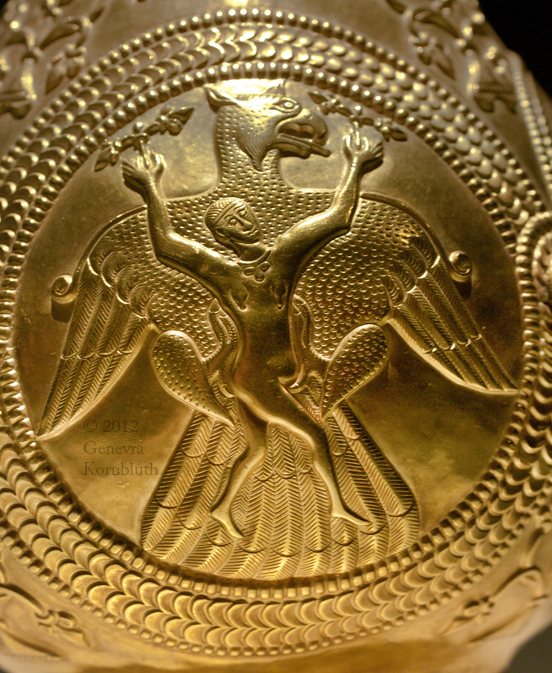
Illustration on the Treasure of Nagyszentmiklós depicting Álmos legend from the Hungarian mythology: Dream of Emese with the Turul bird. Avar gold treasure from the 7-9th century, it was found in 1799 in Nagyszentmiklós, Kingdom of Hungary (now Sânnicolau Mare, Romania). It locates today at the Kunsthistorisches Museum in Vienna.

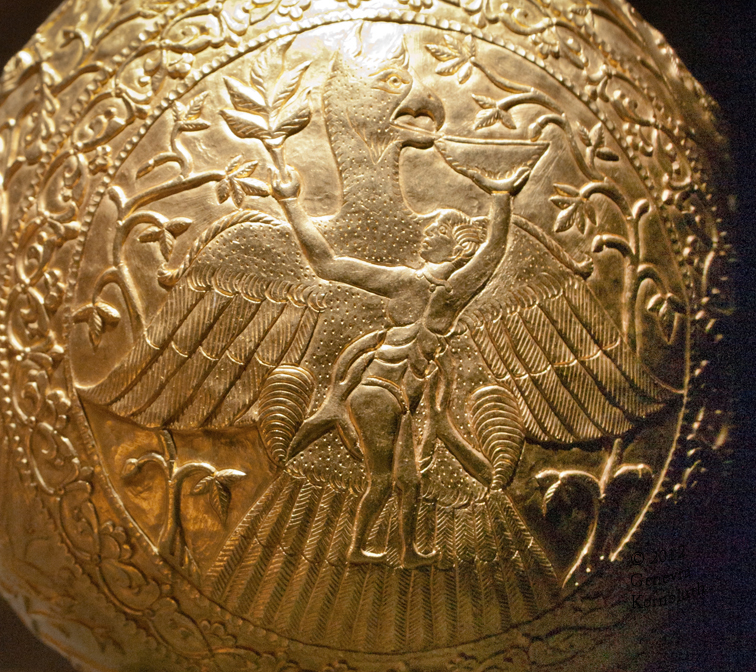
Similar Turul depiction on another gold item of the Treasure of Nagyszentmiklós

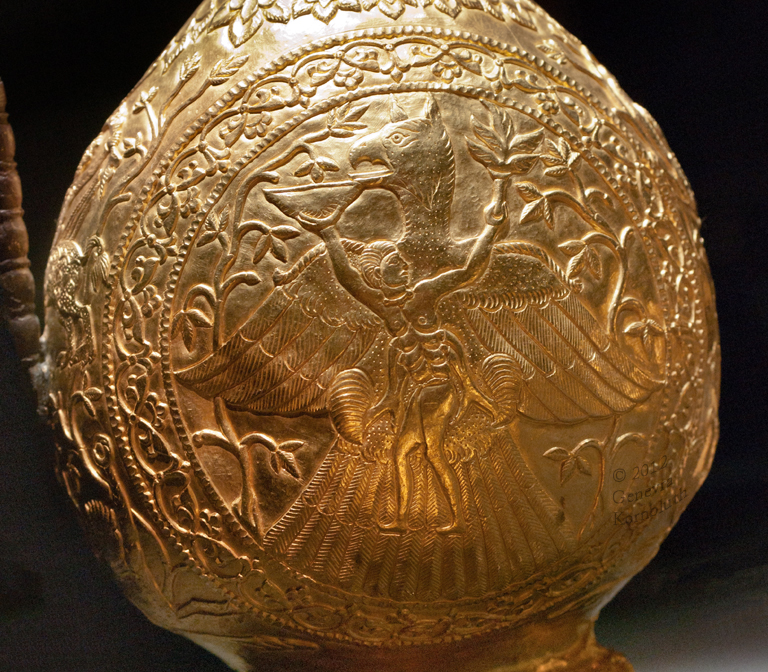
Similar Turul depiction on another gold item of the Treasure of Nagyszentmiklós

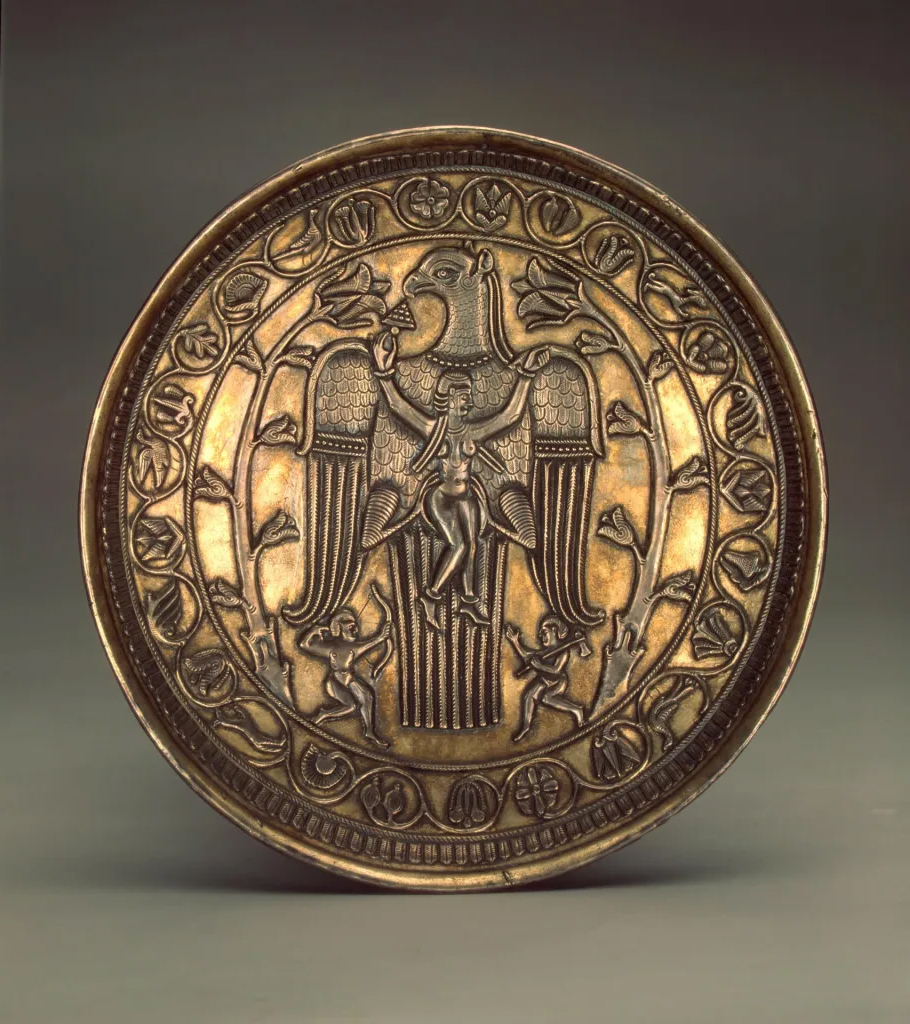
A similar scene on a Sassanid silver plate from the 7th century; decorated with an eagle carrying a woman, the plate was found in Cherdynsky District in the Soviet Union in 1934, now in the Hermitage Museum in Saint Petersburg.

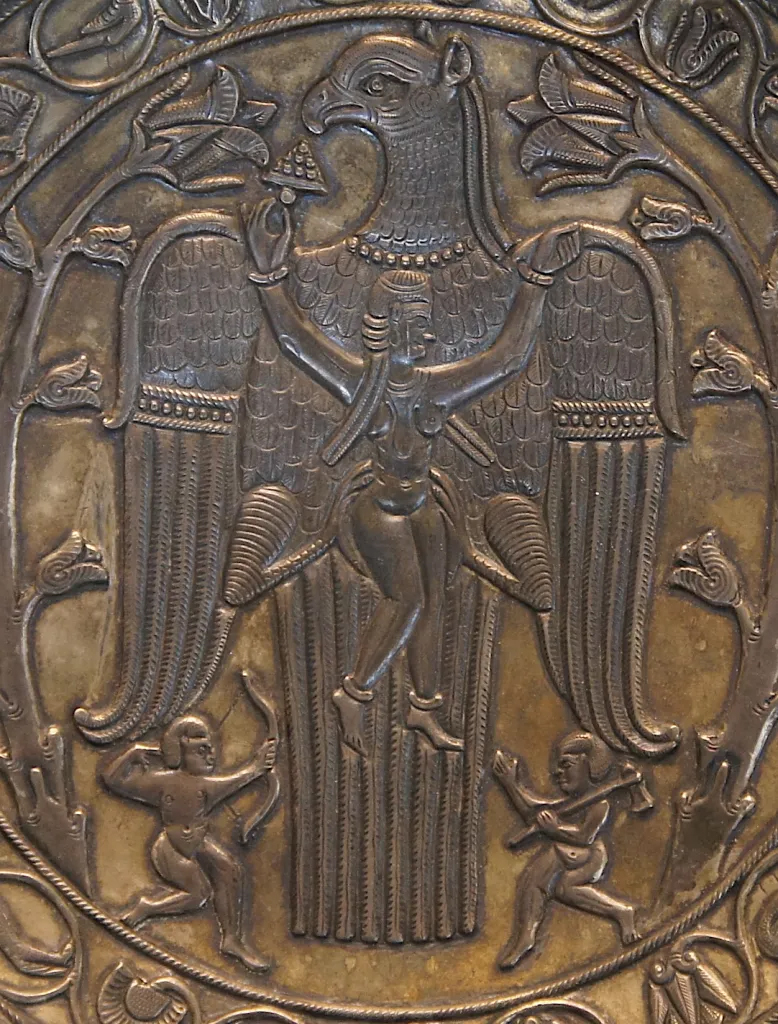
Close up scene of the Sassanid silver plate

== Emese in written sources ==
Emese is mentioned in two historical works: the Gesta Hungarorum and the Chronicon Pictum. Neither source is contemporary with Emese, as each was written centuries after her death (the Gesta around 1200 and the Chronicon Pictum in the 14th century). Both works freely intermingle actual historical events with legend and chivalric tales, so it is impossible to know if Emese is mentioned as legend or as an actual historical personage.

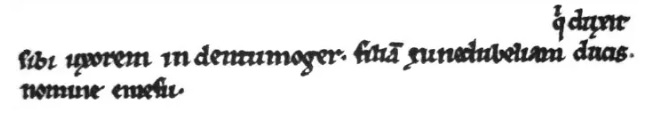
Excerpt from the Gesta Hungarorum (Chapter 3): "qui duxit sibi uxorem in Dentumoger filiam Eunedubeliani ducis nomine Emesu", the only reference to the name (?) and origin of Álmos' mother

== Interpretations ==
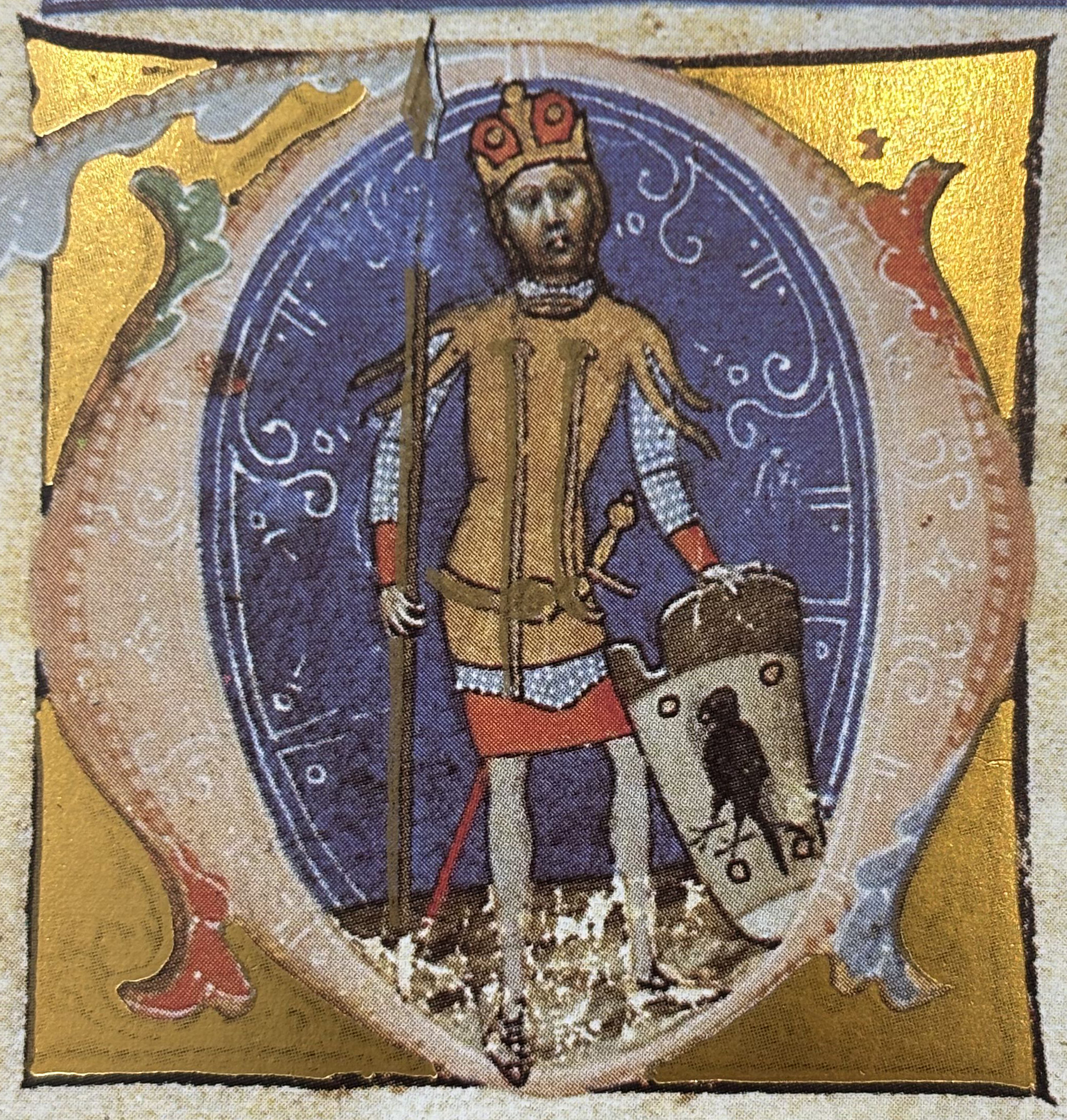
Ügyek, husband of Emese and forefather of the Árpád dynasty, depicted in the 14th-century Chronicon Pictum

It is questionable which chronologically was the first text, since the 14th-century Chronincon Pictum preserved the text of several earlier works, including the presumed 11th-century primordial gesta (Hungarian: ősgeszta). Historian Bálint Hóman considered the latter work already contained the legend of Emese's dream, which was later adopted by several chronicles, including Anonymus. In contrast, György Györffy argued the Gesta Hungarorum provides a grammatically more complete and tidy story about Emese's dream, while the historian also highlighted the text corruption regarding the name of Eunedubelianus ("Eunodbilia") in the Chronicon Pictum. Györffy claimed that Anonymus created the name of Eunedubelianus from Enech, Dula and Belar – characters of the legend of the wondrous hind. Gyula Kristó and many scholars accepted Györffy's consideration. Opposing this viewpoint, philologist János Horváth, Jr. argued the primordial gesta influenced Anonymus' work. Accordingly, "Emese's dream, although stripped of its pagan and totemistic character, could still be included in the oldest written source, which Anonymus logically adds, but the chronicle confuses it precisely by using Anonymus' addition". Dezső Dümmerth argued that the order of the ancient, more logical dream narration was preserved in the chronicles: Anonymus wrote in a more pleasing style, but he messed up a text in which there was a memory of shamanic divination.

György Szabados highlighted that the name of Emese appears in only the Gesta Hungarorum, while the chronicle variants refer to her simply as "the daughter of Eunodbilia". Literary historian Géza Szentmártoni Szabó claimed the names appearing in the dream are actually symbols, forms of manifestation of totemic animals (Eleud = Ölyűd, "buzzard"; Eunodbilia = Ünődbéli → ünő, "deer cow" or "doe"). Szabó argued Anonymus made the word "emesu" a personal name due to a misunderstanding. According to him, the word emes, i.e. émés, in the form émést, was probably formed from the verb émik, which in the Old Hungarian language meant a half-awake, half-ecstatic state during vigil, when the boundaries between dream and reality are blurred. In his 16th-century world chronicle, Lutheran pastor István Székely was the first to publish the "Turul dream" in Hungarian in this context. György Szabados accepted Szabó's theory. He argued the primordial gesta contained the Turul legend, and the text "ex filia Eunodbilia" can be translated as "the woman from the gens Eunod or Ünőd". Later, Anonymus mistakenly invented the name Emese and masculinized the phrase "Eunodbilia" to create the name of the chieftain of Dentumoger. Tibor Szőcs argued that the Hungarian word ímés or émés is mentioned in István Székely's 1559 book is an example of a hapax legomenon. Linguist László Balogh read the chieftain's name as an adjective "Yunedubelia" and translated it as "from the tribe Jenő".

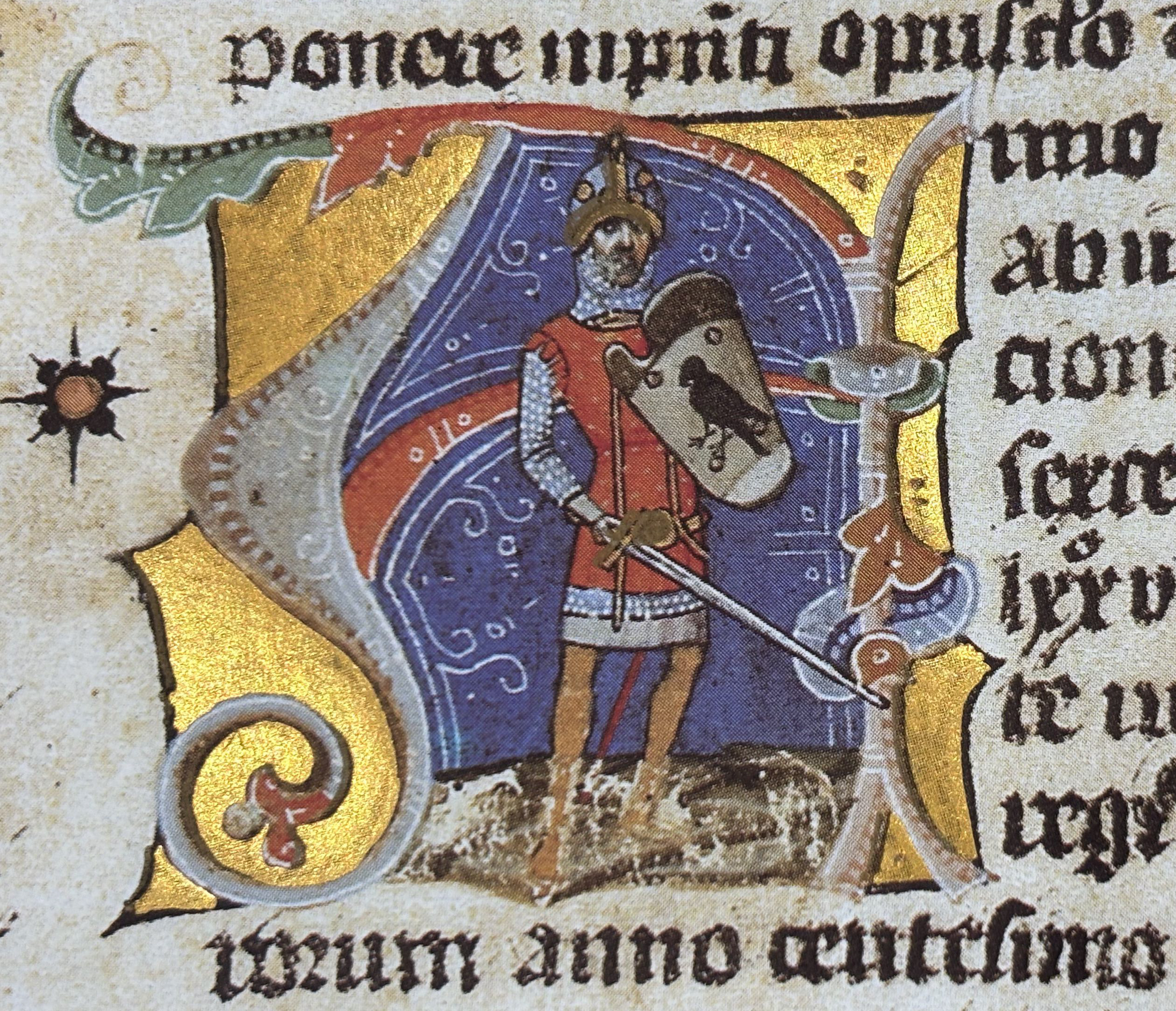
Álmos, son of Emese and the first Grand Prince of the Hungarians, depicted in the 14th-century Chronicon Pictum

Emese's dream functions as the origin myth of the Árpád dynasty. Beside the "Turul legend", the chronicle tradition also states that Álmos descended "from the line" of Attila the Hun. The 13th-century chronicler Simon of Kéza writes King Attila's coat of arms, which he used on his own shield, depicted a bird with a crown, which is called "Turul" in Hungarian, and also states that Álmos was "of the Turul kindred". The historiography is divided on whether the two origin stories are compatible with each other. According to French historian Amédée Thierry, the Turul was the symbol of Attila and described Álmos as the "reincarnation" of the Hunnic ruler. Dezső Dümmerth also connected the Turul legend with the sacredness of Attila. In contrast, János Horváth, Jr. emphasized contradictions between Emese's dream and the "Attilid tradition". According to him, the "real miraculous (totemistic pagan) element of the legend would be fertilization from the Turul; however, according to the narration of our gestas, Emes [Emese] only dreams of it, and even in a blessed state. The fetus (Álmos) only gets its name from this wonderful dream vision, but it itself was conceived by a mundane father, Ügyek. The miraculous fact of the story is therefore reduced to a simple dream, and with it the pagan stamp is also removed". Horváth claimed the content of the Turul legend was deliberately withered and subordinated to the "Attila genealogy", since the "fertilizing" role of the Turul would have been synonymous with the end of the Hunnic ruler's bloodline. György Györffy and Gyula Kristó shared similar viewpoints. Györffy claimed that Emese's story is mere a literary borrowing from Anonymus by adopting the origin myth of Cyrus the Great, denying its nature of an ancient Hungarian tradition. Ethnographer István Pál Demény rejected this view and listed many differences between the two myths. Szabados argued the awareness of the descent of the Árpád dynasty from Attila and the legend of Emese's dream are not two mutually exclusive origin stories, but two complementary elements of a single tradition: the first Hungarian ruling house's own authentic heritage.

Emese's story has close analogies in the nomadic, steppe environment. Notably, in The Secret History of the Mongols, it is reported that Genghis Khan's mother-in-law had a dream that a white falcon ("holding the Sun and the Moon its claws"—the Turul was often depicted as the sun) flew down from the sky and lit on her hand, thus predicting the birth of a child and of the royal dynasty. This is due to the fact that falcons were associated with fertility. Falcons "populate many legends of the foundation of dynasties and empires"; they are popular in the traditions and symbolism of the steppe people, and are not exclusive or originary of any specific ethnic group living therein. 19th-century historian Arnold Ipolyi cited Shahnameh's Simurgh as a similar example regarding its role at the birth of Rostam. Historians Gyula Kristó and Victor Spinei wrote that Emese's story initially narrated the origin of Álmos's dynasty from a totemic ancestor. Accordingly, Anonymus deliberately transformed this pagan story into a Christianized form. György Szabados emphasized that the Turul is mentioned as occurring in a dream of Emese, when she was already pregnant, while former historiography interpreted this as "impregnation" after Dezső Pais and Dezső Dümmerth made mistranslations. László Geréb provided the correct sentence: "a vulture-shaped bird appeared in her [Emese's] dream when she was pregnant". Szabados cited the 7th-century Chronicle of Fredegar, which implies that the Merovingians were descended from a sea-beast called a quinotaur, thus the Hungarian chronicler had no reason to introduce a Christian line into a legend of steppe tradition. György Szabados revived the story of Māhāmāyā of Shakya, to whom a white elephant appeared in a dream before the Buddha was born, while István Pál Demény mentioned similar stories from the faith of Native Americans. Consequently both historians rejected the nomadic and steppe nature of the Turul legend, and assumed a much more ancient folkloristic tradition that can be traced back to the dawn of humanity.

== Name ==
Emese is also a feminine Hungarian name. According to linguist Dezső Pais, its meaning is mother or breastfeeder. Emese means "little mother" in ancient Hungarian. It derives from "eme", mother, and the agglutinating "[s]e", which stands for "little". Its root is Finno-Ugric, cf. Finnish emä, from Proto-Finnic *emä, from Proto-Uralic *emä, and Hungarian anya, from Proto-Uralic *ańa. Cognates of emä include Estonian ema, Northern Sami eapmi ("pistil"), and Nganasan немы (ńemy). However, as linguist Loránd Benkő wrote, the word "emse" (=mother) first appears only 1681, so this can also be a retrospective identification attempt with the progenitress of the Árpád dynasty.

== See also ==
- Hungarian prehistory
- Hungarian mythology
- Turul
- Ügyek
- Álmos
- Árpád
- Árpád dynasty
- Gesta Hungarorum
- Gesta Hunnorum et Hungarorum
- Chronicon Pictum
