= Blood oath (Hungarians) =

Pact between ancient Hungarian tribes

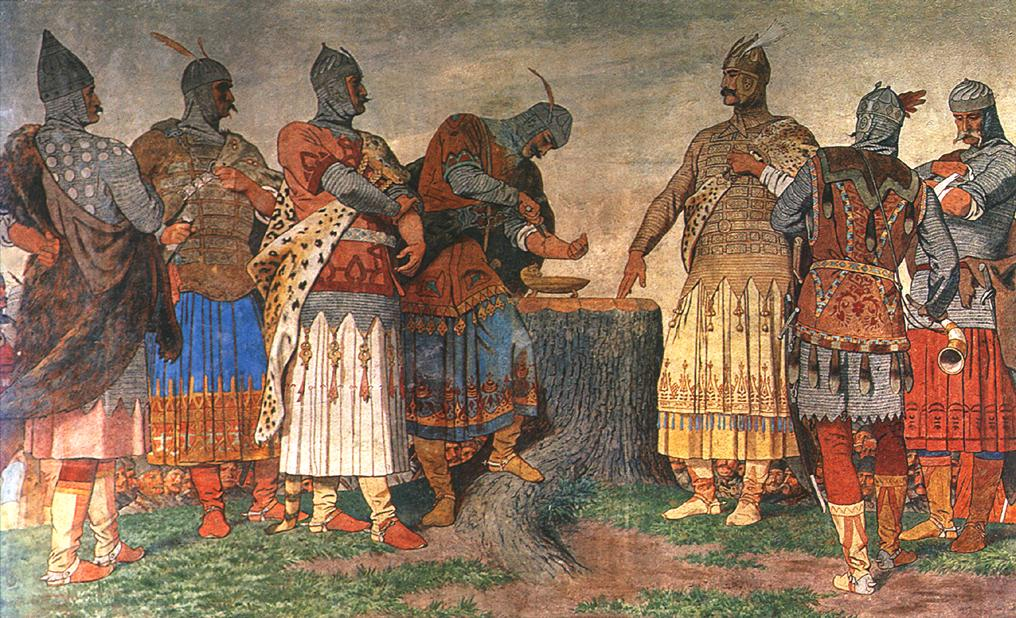
Fresco by Bertalan Székely in the ceremonial hall of the city hall of Kecskemét, Hungary. Created between 1895 and 1897, the painting features a depiction of the bull's head bowl, from the treasure of Nagyszentmiklós.

The blood oath (Hungarian: vérszerződés, lit. "blood contract") was, according to tradition, a pact among the leaders of the seven Hungarian tribes, traditionally held to be the first, unwritten constitution of the Hungarian nation. Its story, along with the terms agreed upon in it, is mostly known from the somewhat unreliable Gesta Hungarorum, a chronicle written between 1196–1203 and is thus possibly influenced by 12th century laws and customs. The oath was sealed by the seven leaders – Álmos, Előd, Ond, Kond, Tas, Huba and Töhötöm – by cutting their arms and letting their blood into a chalice. Becoming blood brothers is likely to have been used traditionally to seal exceptionally strong oaths, and there must have been several similar oaths, but the phrase "blood oath" usually refers to the one by the seven leaders.

== In the Gesta Hungarorum ==
The blood oath is usually regarded to have taken place in the 9th century, under High Prince Álmos, in Etelköz, before the migration into the Carpathian basin. The author of Gesta – only known as "Magister P" and generally referred to as "Anonymus" – narrated its story in his book.

"Then they said to Chieftain Álmos together: »We have chosen you, from this day onward, to be our leader and commander, and wherever your destiny takes you, we are bound to follow.« Then each of the aforementioned men let, in accord with Pagan custom, his blood into a vessel, and sanctioned his oath therewith. And although they were Pagans, still they kept this oath they made together until this death.
And thus was the first part of the oath: That as long as they live and their descendants live, their leader will always be from Álmos's lineage. And thus was the second part of the oath: That all wealth acquired by them will be divided between them. And thus was the third part of the oath: That the nobles who have chosen Álmos as their leader by their own will, and their descendants, will always be included in the leader's council and will bear the country's offices. And thus was the fourth part of the oath: If someone of their descendants would ever be disloyal to the leader or would incite disagreement between the leader and his kin, then he should have his blood spilt, just as the leaders' blood was let from their body when they swore their oath to Chieftain Álmos. And thus was the fifth part of the oath: If a descendant of Álmos or the other leaders would violate the terms of this agreement, he should be forever cursed. The names of these seven men were: Álmos, father of Árpád; Előd, father of Szabolcs, a forefather of the Csák clan; Kend, father of Korcán, Ond, father of Ete, a forefather of the Kalán and Kölcse clans; Tas, father of Lél, Huba, forefather of the Szemere clan; the seventh was Tétény, father of Horka, whose sons were Gyula and Zombor, forefathers of the Maglód clan, which will be written about later. But enough of this, let's follow the course of history.” – Anonymus: Gesta Hungarorum

According to contemporary sources, similar blood oaths were common among Nomadic peoples that were similar to the Hungarians, like the Scythians. Herodotus described a Scythian ritual in which "a large earthen bowl is filled with wine, and the parties to the oath, wounding themselves slightly with a knife or an awl, drop some of their blood into the wine; then they plunge into the mixture a scymitar, some arrows, a battle-axe, and a javelin, all the while repeating prayers; lastly the two contracting parties drink each a draught from the bowl, as do also the chief men among their followers."

== Interpretation ==
The description of the oath taking ceremony mirrors the political and societal changes during Anonymus' lifetime. The increasing power of the nobles and their need for the codification of their rights culminated in the issuing of the Golden Bull of 1222. Several historians concluded that Anonymus' intentions in writing down this agreement were to express the societal changes during his own period, and support the fight for the rights of the nobility, as a kind of historical justification. According to historian István Nemeskürty "The aim of Magister P. (Anonymus) is to justify the rights and claims of 13th century Hungarian nobility and create a lineage going back to the Conquest for all of his friends and family. Also, although Anonymus stresses that his works are based on written sources, he wanted to create a literary work in the style of his own time period."
