= Ügyek =

Magyar chieftain (late 8th – early 9th century)

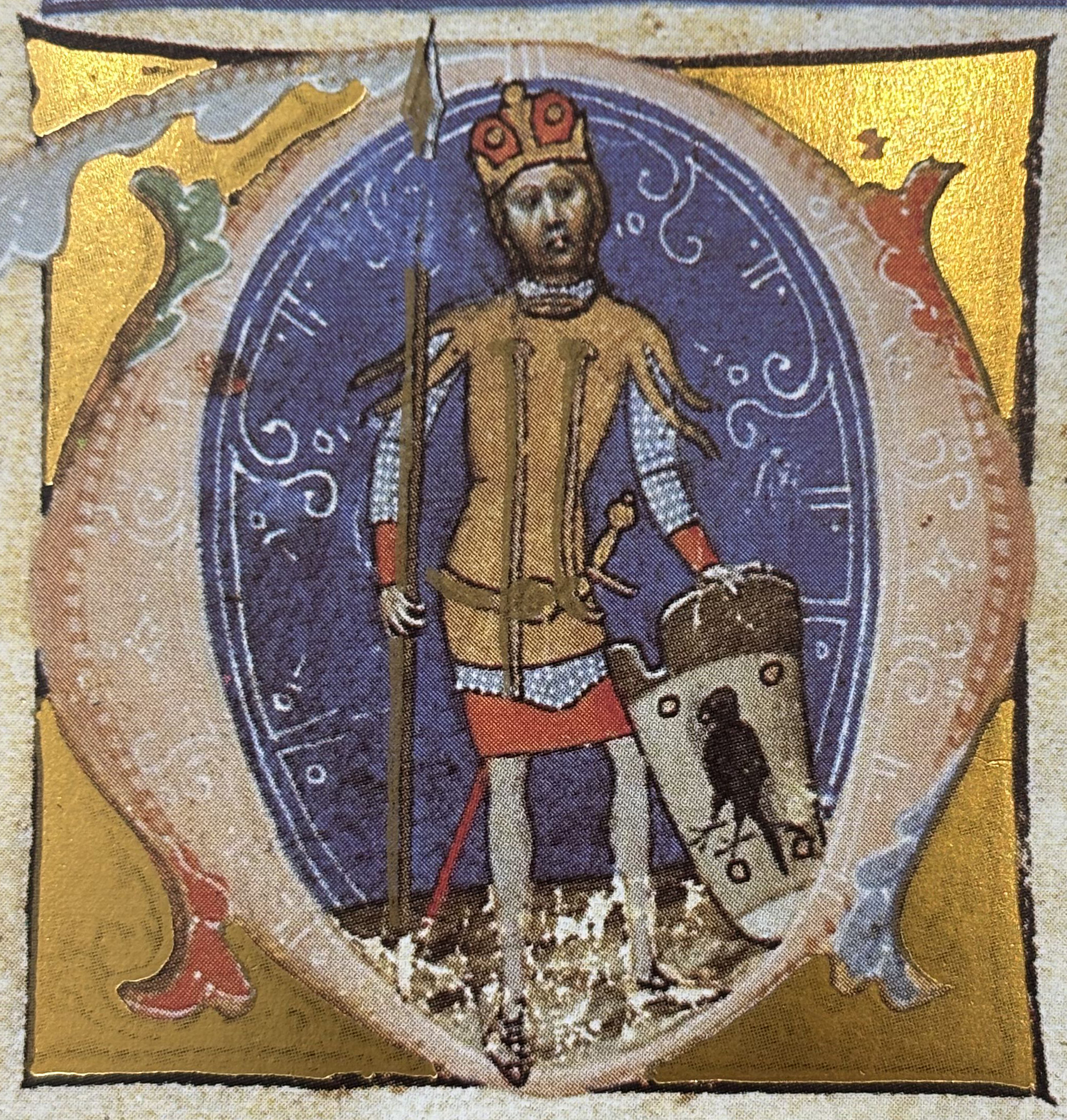
- Ügyek depicted in the Illuminated Chronicle
- Died: after 818
- Spouse: Emese (since 819)
- Issue: Álmos
- House: House of Árpád

Ügyek (second half of the 8th century – first half of the 9th century), also known as Ugek or Ugec (also styled Vgec (Note: Before Mihály Vörösmarty first standardised Hungarian orthography in 1832, letters u and v would often be used interchangeably.)), was – according to the chronicler Anonymus (or "Master P.") – the father of Álmos, the first Grand Prince of the Hungarians. However, according to a conflicting source, Simon of Kéza (writing about five to eight decades later), Előd was the father of Álmos, while the chronicler referred to Ügyek as Álmos's grandfather. He is the earliest known ancestor of the Árpád dynasty. He was said to be a Scythian, i.e. to be from Dentumoger, the homeland of the Magyars, which the chroniclers identify with Scythia, and use to refer both to the land and its inhabitants. (Note: According to the Annals of St. Bertin, the Magyars who invaded East Francia in 862 were enemies "hitherto unknown" to the local population. Likewise, Regino of Prüm wrote that the Magyars had been "unheard of in the previous centuries because they were not named" in the sources. Both remarks evince that late 9th-century authors had no knowledge of the Magyars' origins. However, the Magyar raids reminded the Western European and Byzantine scholars of earlier historians' descriptions of the Scythians or Huns, which gave rise to their identification with those peoples. For instance, Leo the Wise listed the Hungarians among the "Scythian nations".)

== Life ==
In the year of Our Lord's incarnation 819, Ügek, the noblest chieftain of Scythia descending from the great house of Magog, took to wife in Dentumoger the daughter of Prince Eunedubelianus, called Emese, from whom he begot a son, who was named Álmos. But he is called Álmos from a divine event, because when she was pregnant a divine vision appeared to his mother in a dream in the form of a falcon that seemed to come to her and impregnate her and made known to her that from her womb a torrent would come forth and from her loins glorious kings be generated, but that they would not multiply in their own land. Because a dream is called álom in the Hungarian language and his birth was predicted in a dream, so he was called Álmos. Or he was called Álmos, that is holy, because holy kings and dukes were born of his line.

— Anonymus: Gesta Hungarorum

Ügyek was born in the last third of the 8th century. Anonymus writes that Ügyek married Emese, a daughter of "Prince Eunedubelianus" in 819. She had seen a divine dream of a Turul bird before Álmos's birth in c. 820, according to the chronicles. The Turul's role is interpreted as guardian spirit, who protects the baby from harm until he grows up. It is supported by the chronicles, according to whom the Turul appears to the already pregnant woman.

Historian Gyula Kristó said Ügyek's name may have been the chronicler' invention, since it derives from the ancient Hungarian ügy ("saint, holy") word.

== Meaning of the name ==
Anonymus gives the name as Ugec; this caused much speculation later, as to the meaning of it. The latest research on the subject gives the following explanations regarding the origin and meaning of the name:

- Ügyek - Dezső Pais, in his book of 1926, put forward the idea that the name is to be derived from the Hungarian word igy/egy (‛holy’). Gyula Kristó also shared this view.
- Öge/Üge - Dignitary name, according to historian György Györffy. The meaning of it is "wise" and "sage", also "councillor". The word, as 10% words in modern Hungarian, is of Turkic origin. Many Hungarian personal names, and also animal and plant names, are of Turkic origin. Further, the majority of Hungarian tribal names were of Turkic origin, who overall made a significant contribution to Hungarians during their century-long cohabitation.
- Üge - The last ruler of the Uyghur Empire, also a contemporary to Ügyek. He was murdered in 846 in the Altai Mountains. It is speculated, that when the Empire fell apart, some Uyghur fragments could have escaped westward.

== Significance ==
There are three types of great ancestry in the traditional steppe culture.

1. The distant, 'spiritual' ancestor, who took an important step, but the real power of his dynasty came many generations later;
2. The founder of an empire, that is inherited by the descendants;
3. Someone important in the family tree, related to whom the descendants must define themselves.

Ügyek clearly belongs to the first group. Other examples belonging to this category are Ertogrul, (father of Osman), Sheikh Safi (founder of the Safavids), Saman Khuda (founder of the Samanids), among many others. The Turul narrative is strongly reminiscent of an episode narrated in The Secret History of the Mongols, concerning the foundation of the royal Mongol dynasty. All these traditions popular among different peoples, including the Magyars, were informed by the traditional steppe culture, and do not belong to any specific ethnic group.

== Family trees ==
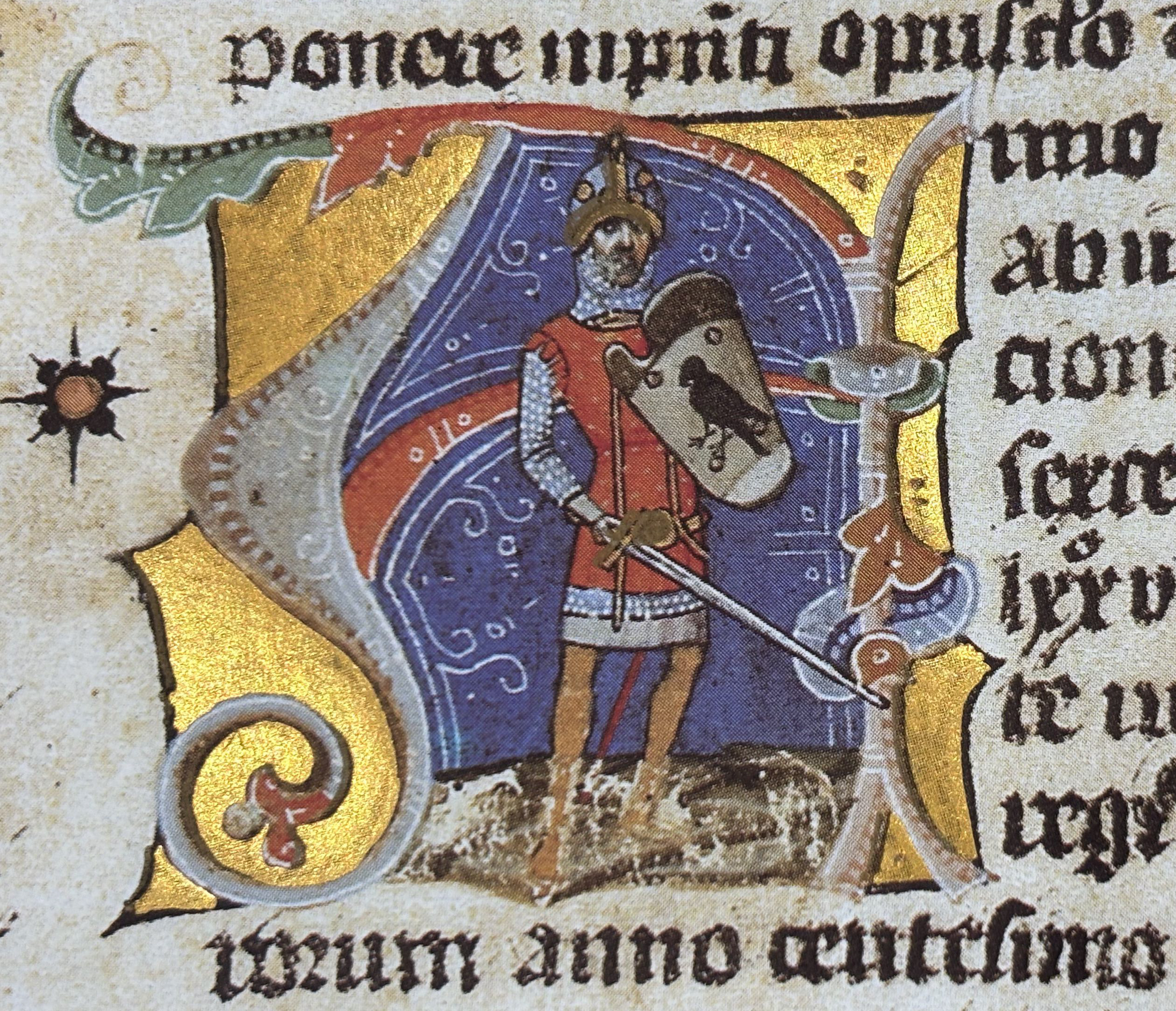
Ügyek's son or grandson Álmos, the first ruler of the Hungarians

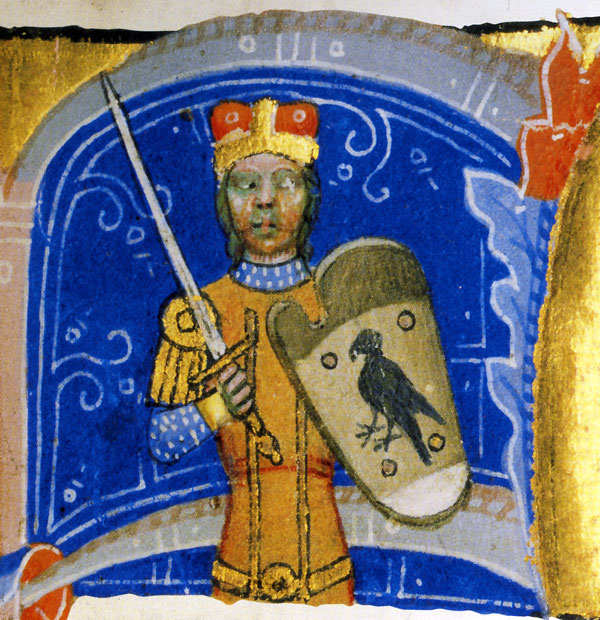
Álmos' son Árpád, who conquered the Carpathian Basin

According to Anonymus's Gesta Hungarorum:

:

Attila
Unknown	Eunedubelianus
Ügyek	Emese
Álmos
Árpád
Hungarian monarchs

According to Simon of Kéza's Gesta Hunnorum et Hungarorum: (Note: Simon did not explicitly name Attila as the Árpáds' ancestor; still, he claimed that the Árpáds' clan is named Turul, a bird-of-prey that allegedly had appeared on Attila's coat of arms.)

Ügyek
Előd
Álmos
Árpád
Hungarian monarchs

According to Mark of Kalt's Chronicon Pictum:

:

Attila
Csaba
Ed
Ügyek	Eunodubilia
Előd	Unnamed daughter (Note: Mark simply called Álmos's mother "filia Eunodbilia".)
Álmos
Árpád
Hungarian monarchs

== See also ==
- Şilki

== Sources ==
- B. Szabó János – Sudár Balázs: "Vgec-ügyek – Egy elfeledett ősapa". In: Türk Attila (szerk.): Hadak útján XXIV. A népvándorláskor fiatal kutatóinak XXIV. konferenciája Esztergom, 2014. november 4–6. 2. kötet. PPKE – ELTE, Budapest–Esztergom, 2017. 223–231. o. Contains a summary in English at the end.
- Kristó, Gyula; Makk, Ferenc (1996). Az Árpád-ház uralkodói [Rulers of the Árpád House] (in Hungarian). IPC Könyvek.
- Korai Magyar Történeti Lexikon (9-14. század), főszerkesztő: Kristó, Gyula, szerkesztők: Engel, Pál és Makk, Ferenc (Akadémiai Kiadó, Budapest, 1994)
- Spinei, Victor (2003). The Great Migrations in the East and South East of Europe from the Ninth to the Thirteenth Century. Translated by Dana Badulescu. Romanian Cultural Institute. ISBN 973-85894-5-2.
