= Álmos =

Hungarian leader from c. 850 to c. 895

- Kende or gyula of the Hungarians
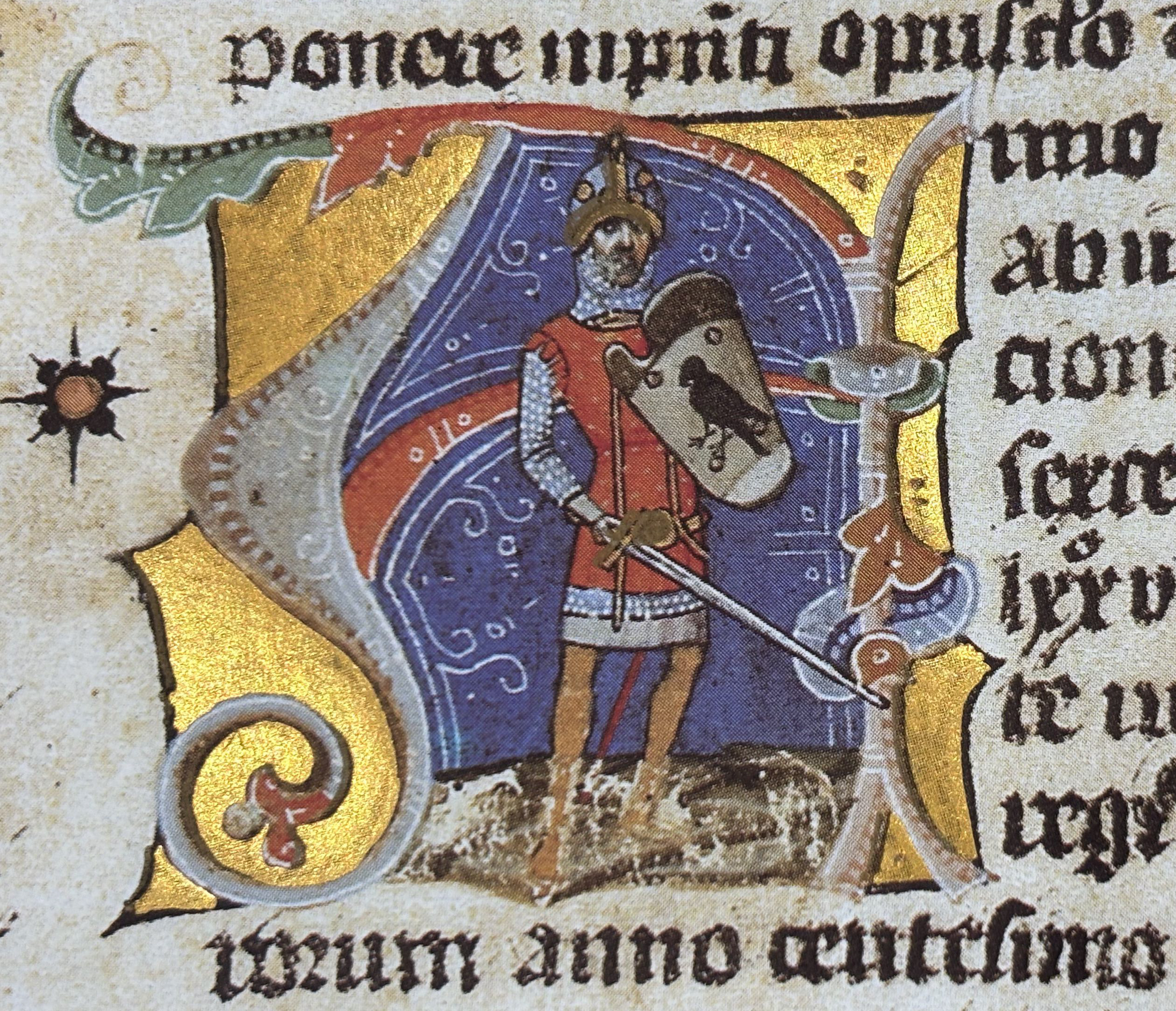
- Álmos depicted in the Illuminated Chronicle

Grand Prince of the Hungarians
- Reign: c. 850 – c. 895
- Predecessor: Levedi (?)
- Successor: Árpád
- Born: c. 820
- Died: c. 895 (aged 75); Transylvania (debated)
- Issue: Árpád
- House: Turul
- Father: Ügyek or Előd
- Mother: Emese
- Religion: Hungarian paganism

Álmos (Hungarian: [ˈaːlmoʃ]), also Almos or Almus (c. 820 – c. 895), was—according to the uniform account of Hungarian chronicles—the first head of the "loose federation" of the Hungarian tribes from around 850. Whether he was the sacred ruler (kende) of the Hungarians or their military leader (gyula) is subject to scholarly debate. According to Constantine Porphyrogenitus, he accepted the Khazar khagan's suzerainty in the first decade of his reign, but the Hungarians acted independently of the Khazars from around 860. The 14th-century Illuminated Chronicle narrates that he was murdered in Transylvania at the beginning of the Hungarian conquest of the Carpathian Basin around 895.

== Ancestry ==
An anonymous notary during the reign of Béla III, author of the Gesta Hungarorum — who wrote his "historical romance" around 1200 or 1210 — stated that Álmos descended "from the line" of Attila the Hun. A late-13th-century chronicler, Simon of Kéza, wrote that Álmos was "of the Turul kindred". He also wrote that Attila the Hun carried a banner which bore "the image of the bird the Hungarians call turul", probably either a gyrfalcon or a hawk. A bird has an important role in the legend about Álmos's birth, which was preserved by both the Gesta Hungarorum and the Illuminated Chronicle. The legend says that Álmos's mother, already pregnant with him, dreamed of a bird of prey "which had the likeness of a hawk" impregnating her. This story has close analogies in the nomadic, steppe environment. Notably, in The Secret History of the Mongols, it is reported that Genghis Khan's mother-in-law had a dream that a white falcon ("holding the Sun and the Moon its claws"—the Turul was often depicted as the sun—) flew down from the sky and lit on her hand, thus predicting the birth of a child and of the royal dynasty. This is due to the fact that falcons were associated with fertility. Falcons "populate many legends of the foundation of dynasties and empires"; they are popular in the traditions and symbolism of the steppe people, and are not exclusive or originary of any specific ethnic group living therein.

Historians Gyula Kristó and Victor Spinei wrote that this story initially narrated the origin of Álmos's family from a totemic ancestor.

According to the Gesta Hungarorum, Álmos was born to the Scythian (Note: According to the Annals of St. Bertin, the Magyars who invaded East Francia in 862 were enemies "hitherto unknown" to the local population. Likewise, Regino of Prüm wrote that the Magyars had been "unheard of in the previous centuries because they were not named". in the sources. Both remarks evince that late 9th-century authors had no knowledge of the Magyars' origins. However, the Magyar raids reminded the Western European and Byzantine scholars of earlier historians' descriptions of the Scythians or Huns, which gave rise to their identification with those peoples. For instance, Leo the Wise listed the Hungarians among the "Scythian nations".) leader Ügyek and Emese, a daughter of "Prince Eunedubelian". Kristó wrote that her name, containing the old Hungarian word for mother (em), may have been invented by Anonymus. On the other hand, Anonymous referred to Álmos's wife as "The daughter of a certain most noble prince of Scythia." The name of Álmos's father is uncertain because the Hungarian chronicles preserved it in two variants. Anonymus states that Ügyek was his name, but the 14th-century Illuminated Chronicle says that Előd—himself the son of Ügyek—was Álmos's father. Kristó says that both names may have been the chroniclers' inventions, since Ügyek's name derives from the ancient Hungarian ügy ("saint, holy") word, and Előd's name simply refers to an ancestor. Anonymus writes that Ügyek married Emese in 819. If this date is correct, Álmos was born around 820.

Anonymus makes a connection between the name of Álmos and the Hungarian word for dream (álom), which is perhaps the most cited origin for the name. In modern Hungarian, the name means "sleepy", "drowsy"; however, the given name Álmos likely derives from álom, as mentioned, "dream", itself the root of álmos, "drowsy". Derivation from a word meaning "dream" would better fit the legend surrounding his birth, narrating his mother's dream. The word álom has Proto-Finno-Ugric root, from adema ("sleeping, dream"). Cognates include Eastern Mari омо (omo) and Mansi ӯлем (ūlem, "dream"). Even Kristó granted that the etymology of Álmos' name "is possible in the way described by the anonymous notary, that is, the name Álmos could be derived from the Hungarian word álom (almu) 'dream'. " More skeptical authors have still remarked that "The etymology relating the name to the Hungarian common noun álom 'dream' cannot be rejected as readily [as other proposed etymologyes]."

Historians András Róna-Tas, and Victor Spinei argued that his name is of Turkic origin. However, Spinei himself responded to the suggestion of a Turkic origin of the individual based on the Turkic etymology of his name by saying that a name's etymology does not always reflect its bearer's ethnicity. 10% of words in modern Hungarian are of Turkic origin, who made a consistent genetic and cultural contribution to the Magyars. In the 19th century, a Turkic, rather than Uralic origin for Hungarian was proposed, due to the large and varied layer of loans and all the influences absorbed by Hungarians after several centuries of cohabitation. The Magyars' historical social structure itself is said to be of Turkic origin. The words "Hungarian" and "Hun", too, are considered of Turkic origin. Many Hungarian names, and also animal and plant names, are of Turkic origin, and the majority of Hungarian tribal names were of Turkic origin. However, the Magyars are not a Turkic people. According to the Turkic theory, the name meant "the bought one" in Turkic.

Linguist Bela Kalman wrote that: "The name Álmos, however, is not of Turkic origin, but the Hungarian secondary formation of the Hungarian word of Finno-Ugric origin álom, meaning that which is dreamt about."

Álmos, born to a Hungarian prince and Emese, "the mother of all ethnic Hungarians", led his people to the conquest of the Carpathian Basin after they were attacked by the Turkic Pechenegs. He was chosen as leader of the Magyars by the latter's chieftains, who had initially appointed Lebed as their permanent leader. The ethnic Hungarians became known after Álmos' tribe, which proved the strongest of the seven Hungarian tribes.

In the 819th year of Our Lord's incarnation, Ügyek, who, as we said above, being of the family of King Magog became a long time later the most noble prince of Scythia, took to wife in Dentumoger the daughter of Duke Eunedubelian, called Emese, from whom he sired a son, who was named Álmos. But he is called Álmos from a divine event, because when she was pregnant a divine vision appeared to his mother in a dream in the form of a falcon that, as if coming to her, impregnated her and made known to her that from her womb a torrent would come forth and from her loins glorious kings be generated, but that they would not increase in their land. Because, therefore, a dream is called "álom" in the Hungarian language and his birth was predicted in a dream, so he was called Álmos. Or he is thus called Álmos, that is holy, because holy kings and dukes were born of his line.

— Anonymus: Gesta Hungarorum

== Reign ==
Álmos, according to Gesta Hungarorum, was freely elected by the heads of the seven Hungarian tribes as their "leader and master". Anonymus adds that to ratify Álmos's election, the seven chiefs "swore an oath, confirmed in pagan manner with their own blood spilled in a single vessel". Anonymus says that they also adopted the basic principles of the government, including the hereditary right of Álmos's offsprings to his office and the right of his electors' descendant to have a seat in the prince's council. According to author Pál Engel, this report of the "treaty by blood" (Hungarian: vérszerződés), which reflects its authors' political philosophy rather than actual events, was "often presented by Hungarian historians as the very first manifestation of modern parliamentary thinking in Europe" up until 1945.

In a sharply contrasting narrative from around 950, the Byzantine Emperor Constantine VII Porphyrogenitus states that instead of Álmos, his son Árpád was the first supreme head of the Hungarian tribes, and that Árpád's election was initiated by the Khazar khagan. The emperor says the khagan sent an envoy to the "voivodes" (heads of the Hungarian tribes) after they had been forced by the Pechenegs to leave their dwelling places near the Khazar Khaganate and to settle in a new territory called Etelköz. The khagan was planning to appoint one of the voivodes named Levedi to lead the Hungarian tribes to represent the khagan's interests. Although Levedi refused the khagan's offer, he proposed one of his peers, Álmos or Álmos's son Árpád, to the proposed new position. The khagan accepted Levedi's offer. Upon his initiative, the Hungarians elected their first prince, but they preferred Árpád to his father. The work of Constantine VII, who referred to Magyars as Turks, though considered essentially reliable in its core by Western scholars, is often confusing and filled with legends.

Gyula Kristó and many other historians refute Porphyrogenitus's report of the omission of Álmos in favor of his son, saying that the turul legend connected to Álmos's birth proves his role as the forefather of his dynasty. These historians say that the emperor's account is based on a report by one of Árpád's descendants named Termacsu, who emphasized by this report of Árpád's election that only those descending from Árpád were suitable to lead the Hungarians; other children of Álmos were excluded. András Róna-Tas says that Constantine Porphyrogenitus preserved the memory of a coup d'état organized against Levedi kende by Álmos gyula, who had his own son Árpád elected as sacred ruler in his opponent's place. A late-9th-century Central Asian scholar, Abu Abdallah al-Jayhani—whose works were partially preserved in Ibn Rusta's and other Muslim authors' books—mentions the existence of these two high offices among the Hungarians. He describes the kende as the Hungarians' sacred ruler and the gyula as their military commander. Historians still debate which of the two offices was held by Álmos.

The chagan said to [Levedi]: "We have invited you upon this account, in order that, since you are noble and wise and valorous and first among the [Hungarians], we may appoint you prince of your nation, and you may be obedient to our word and our command." But he, in reply, made answer to the chagan: "Your regard and purpose for me I highly esteem and express to you suitable thanks, but since I am not strong enough for this rule, I cannot obey you; on the other hand, however, there is a voivode other than me, called [Álmos], and he has a son called [Árpád]; let one of these, rather, either that [Álmos] or his son [Árpád], be made prince, and be obedient to your word." That chagan was pleased at this saying, and gave some of his men to go with him, and sent them to the [Hungarians], and after they had talked the matter over with the [Hungarians], the [Hungarians] preferred that [Árpád] should be prince rather than [Álmos] his father, for he was of superior parts and greatly admired for wisdom and counsel and valour, and capable of this rule; and so they made him prince according to the custom, or 'zakanon', of the Chazars, by lifting him upon a shield.

— Constantine Porphyrogenitus: De Administrando Imperio

Kristó says that Álmos stood at the head of the Hungarian tribal confederation from around 850. Porphyrogenitus's narration says that he initially accepted the khagan's suzerainty. The Hungarians apparently achieved their independence around 860, since the earliest reports on their plundering raids in Central Europe were recorded thereafter. The Annals of St. Bertin mentions their incursion into Louis the German's realm in 862. Three tribes seceding from the Khazar Khaganate, together known by Porphyrogenitus as "Kabaroi", also joined with the Hungarians in the 860s or 870s. Spinei says that the memory of their arrival was preserved by Anonymus, who mentions "the seven dukes of the Cumans" who "subjected themselves to Prince Álmos" at Kiev.

Anonymus writes of a war between the Hungarians and the Kievan Rus', ending with the victory of the Hungarians, who were commanded by Álmos. The Russian Primary Chronicle refers to a "Hungarian hill" at Kiev in connection with the town's occupation by Oleg of Novgorod in 882. The same chronicle mentions "a castle of Ol'ma" (Олъминъ дворъ) standing on the same hill. George Vernadsky says that this fortress had been named after Álmos, but this theory has not been widely accepted by historians.

== Death ==
The "Hungarian land-taking"

The Hungarians who lived in the westernmost parts of the Pontic steppes were occasionally hired by neighboring powers to intervene in their wars. For instance, they invaded Moravia in alliance with Arnulf of East Francia in 892. Their intervention in a conflict between the First Bulgarian Empire and the Byzantine Empire caused a joint counter-invasion by the Bulgars and Pechenegs. The Hungarians were forced to leave the Pontic steppes and to cross the Carpathians in search of a new homeland around 895.

According to the Gesta Hungarorum, the Hungarians invaded the Carpathian Basin under Álmos, who "appointed his son, Árpád, as leader and master" of the Hungarian tribal federation at Ungvár (Uzhhorod, Ukraine). Thereafter Anonymous does not mention Álmos. In a contrasting report, the Illuminated Chronicle says that Álmos "could not enter Pannonia, for he was killed in Erdelw" (Transylvania). Kristó says that the chronicle preserves the memory of Álmos's sacrifice because of the catastrophic defeat of his people by the Pechenegs. If this is true, his ritual murder proves that Álmos was the sacred leader of the Hungarian tribal federation. Róna-Tas refutes this and says that if the chronicle's report is reliable, Álmos became the victim of a political murder committed or initiated by his own son. Preferring the narration of the Gesta Hungarorum to the report by the Illuminated Chronicle, Victor Spinei states that Álmos was not murdered in Transylvania since Anonymus writes that the Hungarians bypassed this region when invading the Carpathian Basin.

== Family ==
No source preserved the name of Álmos's wife. Anonymus writes that she was "the daughter of a certain most noble prince". Álmos's only child known by name was Árpád, who succeeded Álmos after his death. The following is a family tree presenting Álmos's closest relatives:

Ügyek	Eunedubelian
Előd or Ügyek	Emese
Álmos
Árpád
Hungarian monarchs

== See also ==
- Árpád dynasty
- Sacred king

== Footnotes ==
Álmos House of Árpád Born: c. 820 Died: c. 895
Regnal titles
Preceded by Levedi (?)	Grand Prince of the Hungarians c. 850 – c. 895	Succeeded by Árpád
