= Demeter Csáthi =

Demeter Csáthi (or Csath, Csáti; late 15th – early 16th century) was a Hungarian poet and Franciscan monk. He is the presumed author of a national ballad about the Magyar conquest of Pannonia.
