= Magyar tribes =

Political units in the Hungarian tribal confederation

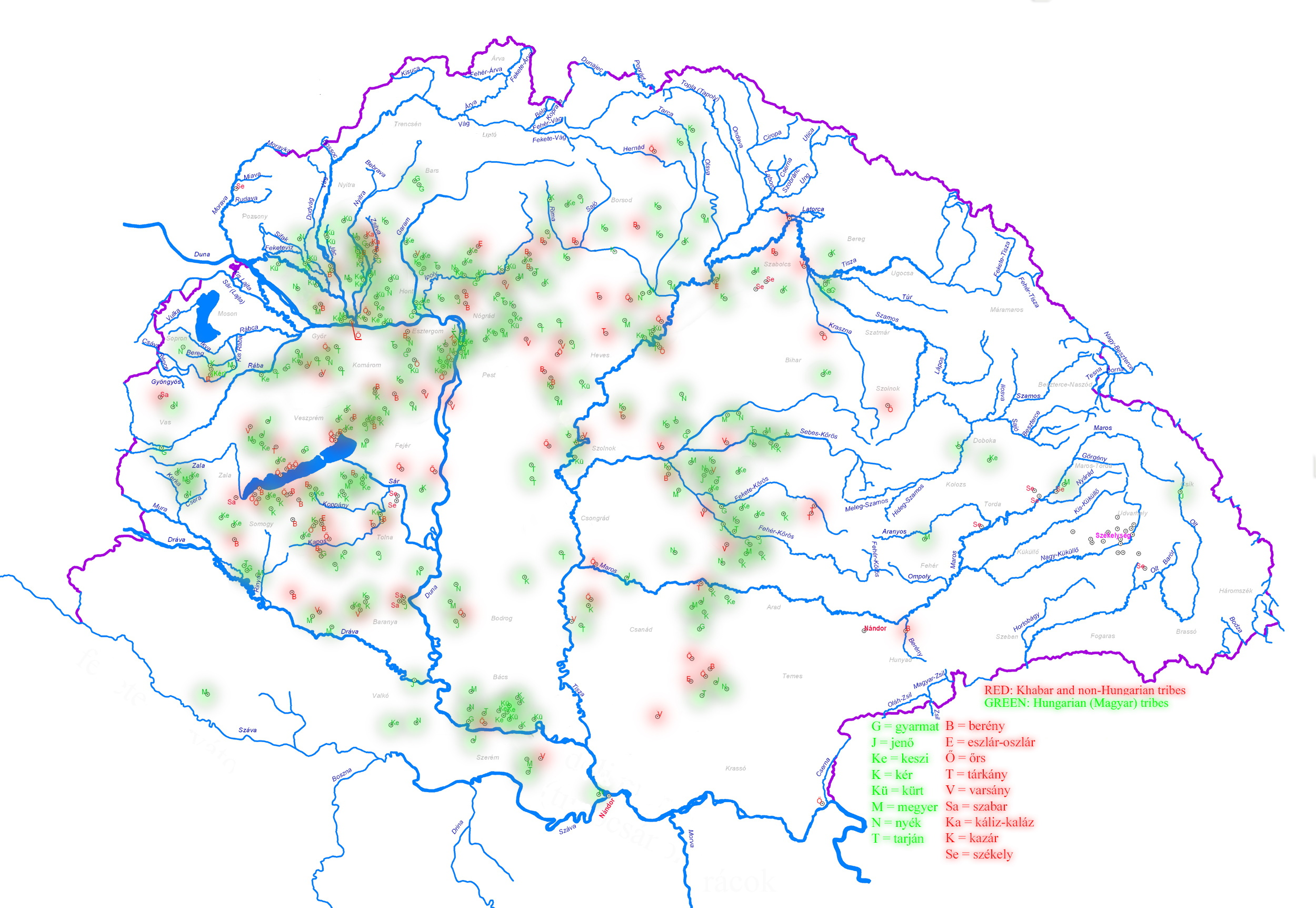
The appearance of Hungarian tribe names in settlement names. It suggests where arriving Hungarians lived amongst other peoples and helped in reconstructing where arriving tribes settled.

The Magyar or Hungarian tribes (/ˈmæɡjɑːr/ MAG-yar, Hungarian: magyar törzsek) or Hungarian clans were the fundamental political units within whose framework the Hungarians (Magyars) lived, before the Hungarian conquest of the Carpathian Basin and the subsequent establishment of the Principality of Hungary.

== Etymology ==
The ethnonym for the ten Hungarian tribes, “Hungarian", is derived from the terms Onoğur—an Oghuric term meaning “Ten Arrows" or "Ten Tribes"—and Hun—for the Huns from whom the Hungarians were believed to have descended. In the 9th and 10th centuries, Byzantine authors referred to Hungarians by names such as Turks, Oungroi, Oungaroi, Ungrs, Hounnoi and Skythai, while Western European authors used names such as Ungri, Ungari, Hungari, Hungrs, Avars, Huns, Turks, and Agaren. An ethnonym for seven of the Hungarian tribes—excluding the three Khazar tribes—recorded in the 13th-century chronicle, Gesta Hungarorum, was "Hetumoger" (modern Hungarian: hét magyar, lit. 'seven Magyars'), as in the Latin phrase, "VII principales persone qui Hetumoger dicuntur" ("seven princely persons who are called Seven Magyars"). The word "Magyar" possibly comes from the name of the most prominent Hungarian tribe, called Megyer, which became used to refer to the Hungarian people as a whole. Written sources called Magyars "Hungarians" before the conquest of the Carpathian Basin when they still lived on the Pontic-Caspian Steppe. For example, Georgius Monachus used "Ungri" to refer to them in 837, the Annales Bertiniani used "Ungri" in 862, and the Annales ex Annalibus Iuvavensibus used "Ungari" in 881.

== History ==
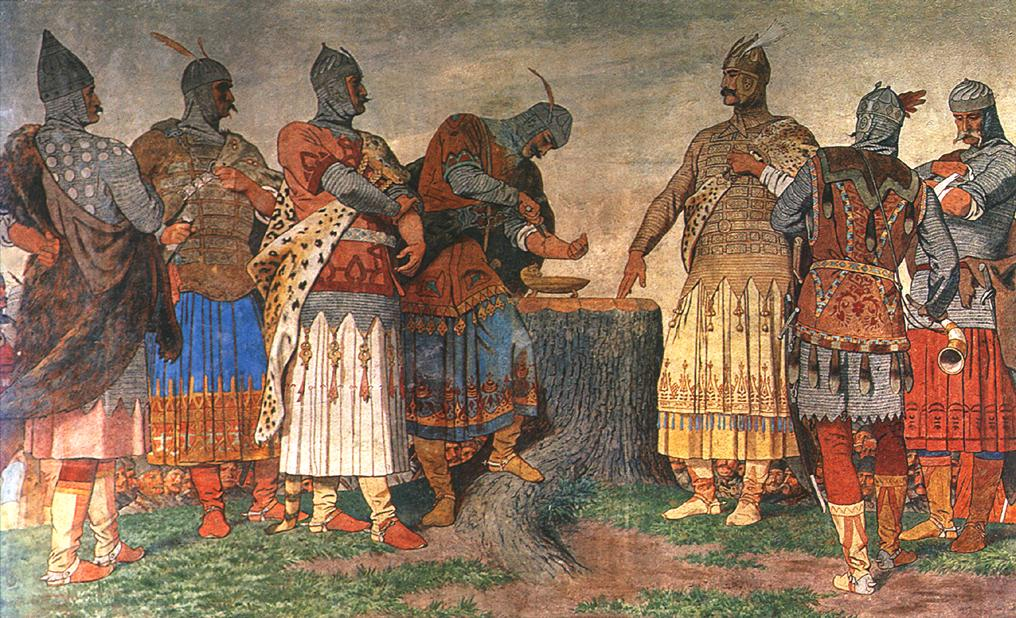
The blood oath in Etelköz.

According to Hungarian historian and linguist András Róna-Tas, the locality in which the Hungarians, the Manicha-Er group, emerged was between the Volga River and the Ural Mountains. It is proposed that most of the early Hungarian tribes originated from the Southern Urals or Western Siberia, where they were composed of a mixed population. However, Neparáczki et al. 2018 proposes that over a third of the Hungarian conquerors' maternal lineages derive from Inner Asia, concentrated in present-day eastern Mongolia and southeastern Siberia, while the remainder is derived from the Pontic-Caspian Steppe. Fóthi et al. 2022 suggests that they originated from three distinct regions on the Eurasian steppe: the Lake Baikal-Altai Mountains region, spanning present-day northwestern Mongolia and southern Siberia, the Southern Urals-Western Siberia and the Black Sea-Northern Caucasus.

According to genetic study, the proto-Ugric groups were part of the Scytho-Siberian societies in the late Bronze Age to early Iron Age steppe-forest zone in present-day northern Kazakhstan, near the territory of Mezhovskaya culture. The ethnogenesis of the proto-Hungarians is believed to have involved proto-Ugrians and early Sarmatians of the steppe-forest zone, and descendants of the late Xiongnu from present-day Mongolia. The proto-Hungarians are believed to have been integrated into the Huns prior to the arrival of the Huns to the Volga region in 370. The Huns were likely descendants of the Xiongnu and originated in present-day Mongolia.

Around 830 CE, when Álmos, the future Grand Prince of the Hungarians, was about 10 years old, the seven related tribes (Jenő, Kér, Keszi, Kürt-Gyarmat, Megyer, Nyék, and Tarján) formed a confederation in Etelköz, called "Hétmagyar" (lit. 'Seven Magyars'). The tribal names were predominantly of Turkic origin. Their leaders, the Seven chieftains of the Magyars, besides Álmos, included Előd, Ond, Kond, Tas, Huba and Töhötöm, who all took a blood oath swearing eternal loyalty to Álmos. Presumably, the Magyar tribes consisted of 108 clans.

Before 881 CE, three Turkic tribes rebelled against the rule of the Khagan of the Khazars, but they were suppressed. After their defeat they left the Khazar Empire and voluntarily joined the Hétmagyar confederation. The three tribes were organised into one tribe, called Kabar, and later they played the roles of vanguard and rear guard during the joint military actions of the confederation. The joining of the three tribes to the previous seven created the On-ogur (Ten Arrows).

== Social organization ==
The Hungarian social structure was of Turkic origin.

== Genetics ==
Magyars comprised seven clans, and later three more clans made of Kabar people. Recent genetic research has shown that the first-generation Magyar core gene pool originated in Central Asia/South Siberia and, as Magyars migrated westward, admixed with various European peoples and peoples of the Caucasus. Burial samples of the Karos-Eperjesszög Magyars place them genetically closest to Turkic peoples, modern south Caucasian peoples, and modern Western Europeans to a limited degree, while no specific Finno-Ugric markers were found. However, a 2008 study done on 10th-century Magyar skeletons did find a few Uralic samples.

== See also ==
- Álmos
- Grand Prince of the Hungarians
- Hungarians
- Hungarian conquest of the Carpathian Basin
- Ügyek
- Zoltán of Hungary
- Árpád dynasty
- Ajtony
- apponyi family
- Csák (genus)
- Both family
- Bogátradvány (gens)

== Sources ==
- Korai Magyar Történeti Lexikon (9-14. század), főszerkesztő: Kristó, Gyula, szerkesztők: Engel, Pál és Makk, Ferenc (Akadémiai Kiadó, Budapest, 1994)
- Kristó, Gyula: A Kárpát-medence és a magyarság régmúltja (1301-ig) (Szegedi Középkortörténeti Könyvtár, Szeged, 1993)
- Magyarország Történeti Kronológiája I. – A kezdetektől 1526-ig, főszerkesztő: Benda Kálmán (Akadémiai Kiadó, Budapest, 1981)
- Makkai, László (2001). Transylvania in the medieval Hungarian kingdom (896-1526), In: Béla Köpeczi, HISTORY OF TRANSYLVANIA Volume I. From the Beginnings to 1606, Columbia University Press, New York, 2001, ISBN 0880334797
