= Dentumoger =

Legendary homeland of Hungarians

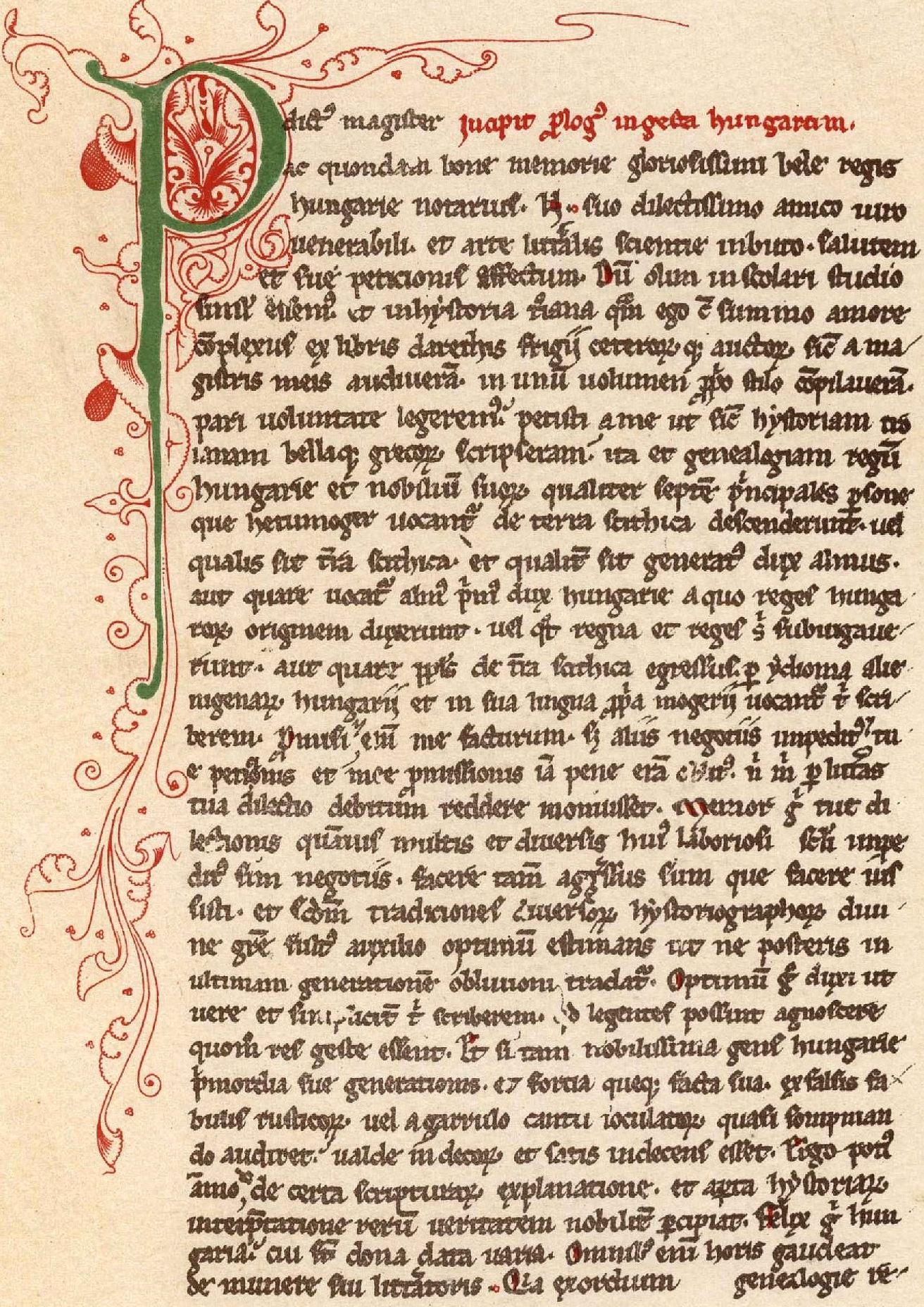
First page of Anonymus's Gesta Hungarorum

Dentumoger, or Dentü-Mogyer, is a legendary homeland of the Hungarians before their conquest of the Carpathian Basin around 895. This name is recorded by the anonymous author of the Gesta Hungarorum ("Deeds of the Hungarians") who identifies it with "Scythia". When using this term, "Anonymus" referred both to a territory and to its inhabitants. In Simon of Kéza's chronicle, Dentia and Mogoria are regions of Scythia.

Anonymus's report of the route taken by the Hungarians from Dentumoger towards present-day Hungary suggests that he placed it in the wider region of the middle course of the Volga River. On the other hand, the toponym is composed of two parts—Dentu which refers to the Don River, and moger which stands for the Magyar endonym of the Hungarians. Anonymus writes that the Hungarians westward migration from Dentumoger started "in the year of Our Lord's incarnation 884".

Scythia is then a very great land, called Dentumoger, over towards the east, the end of which reaches from the north to the Black Sea. On the far side, it has a river with great marshes, called the Don, where sables can be found in such extraordinary abondance that in that land not only nobles and commoners dress in them but also with which even ox-herds, swine-herds and shepherds adorn their raiment. Gold and silver abound there and in the rivers of this land precious stones and gems are found. On its eastern side, neighboring Scythia, were the peoples Gog and Magog, whom Alexander the Great had walled in. Scythia is very extensive in its length and breadth and the men who dwell there, commonly called Dentumoger, have right up to the present day never been subject to the sway of any emperor.

— Anonymus: Gesta Hungarorum

== See also ==
- Magna Hungaria
- Etelköz
- Levedia
