= Előd =

Magyar chieftain

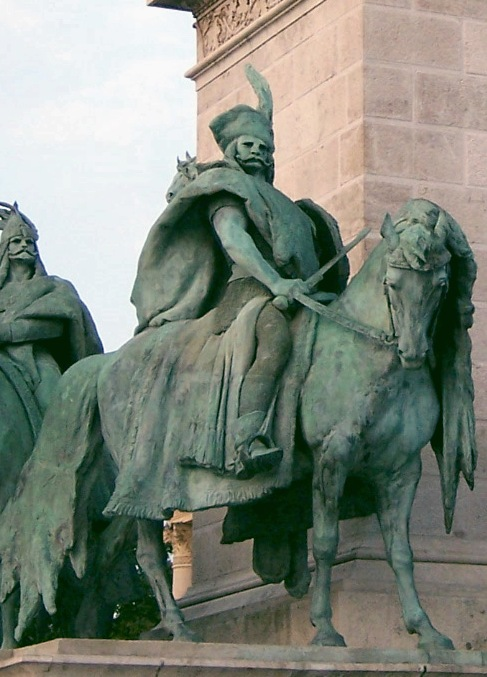
Statue of Előd on the Heroes' Square of Budapest

Előd was – according to the chronicler Anonymus (or "Master P."), author of the Gesta Hungarorum – one of the seven chieftains of the Magyars (Hungarians), who led them to the Carpathian Basin in 895.

There are three somewhat differing accounts concerning Előd's relationship to Álmos, leader of the Magyars, c. 820 – c. 895.

- Anonymus (writing in c. 1215) states that Előd was co-leader, with Álmos during the Magyar conquest of the Carpathian Basin, and claims that Álmos was the son of Ügyek. Anonymus also writes that Szabolcs was the son of Előd.
- Simon of Kéza's Gesta Hunnorum et Hungarorum (c. 1283), states that Előd was the father of Álmos.
- The Chronicon Pictum says he was both the son of Ügyek and father of Álmos.

Előd was the chieftain of the Hungarian Nyék tribe, which occupied the region around Lake Balaton, mainly the areas what are known today Zala and Somogy counties.
