= Anonymus (notary of Béla III) =

12th and 13th century Hungarian chronicler

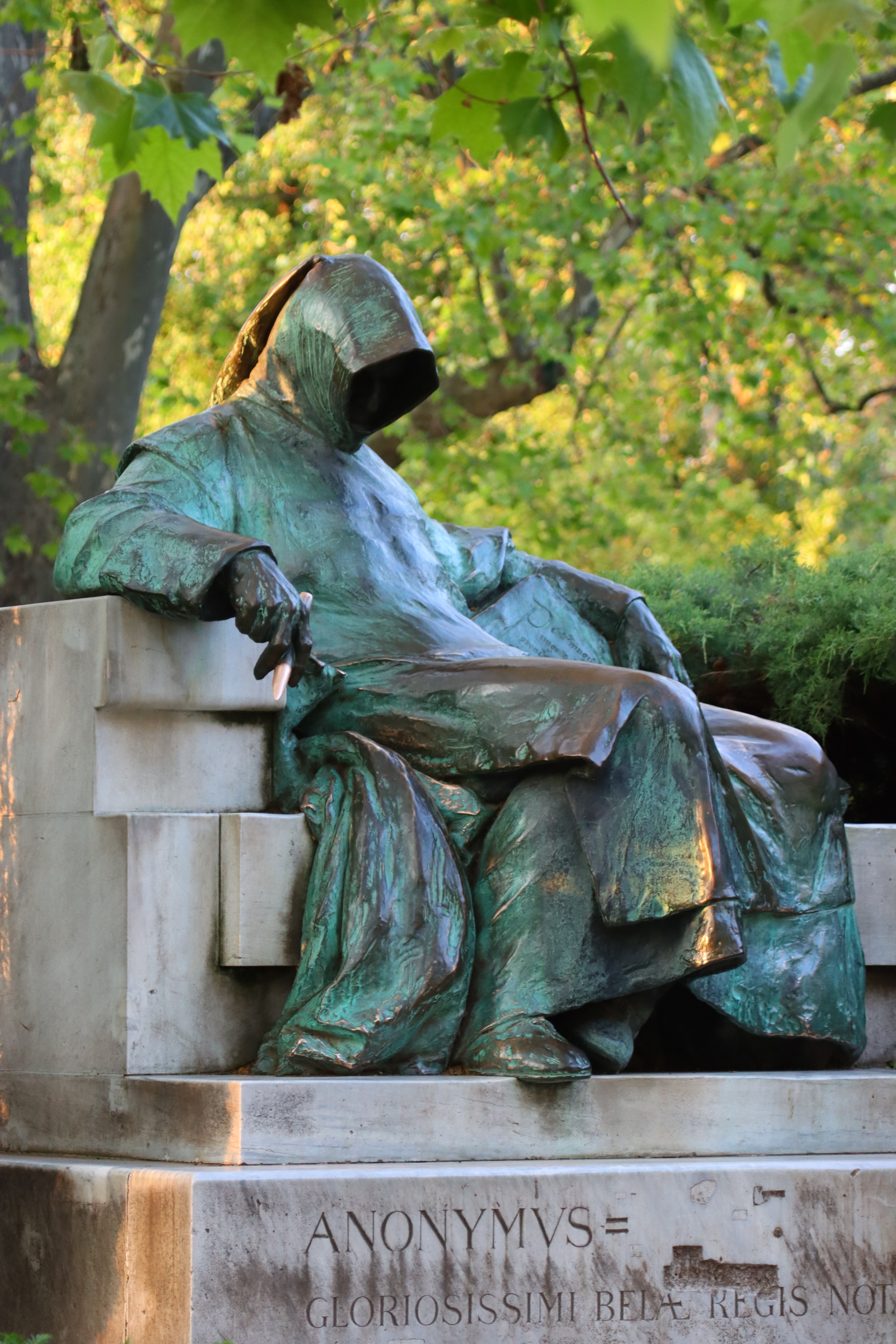
Statue of Anonymus in the City Park of Budapest

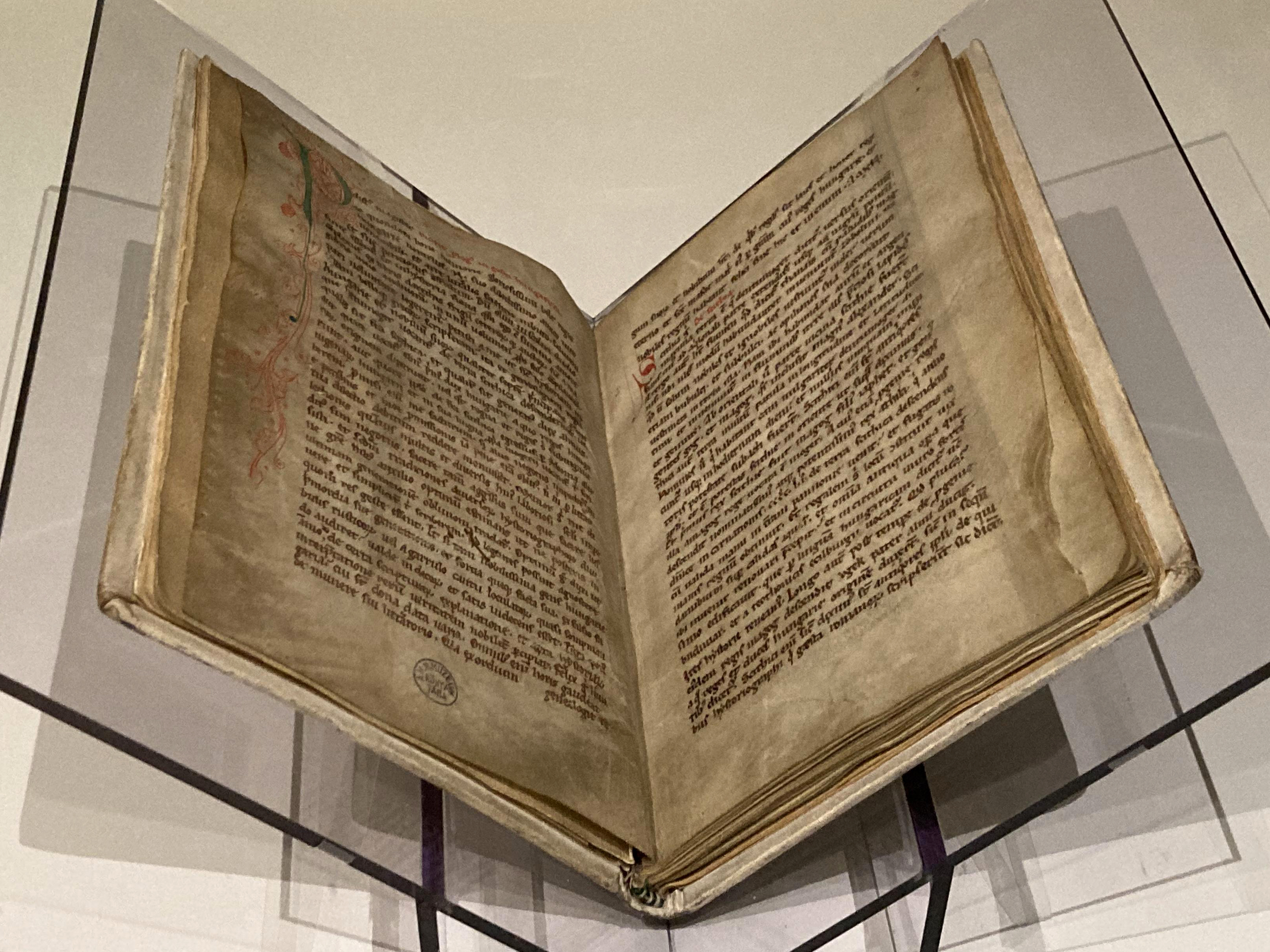
The Gesta Hungarorum

Anonymus Bele regis notarius (/aˈnɔ.ni.mus ˈbeː.le ˈreː.ɡis noˈtaː.ri.us/) ("Anonymous Notary of King Bela") or Master P. (fl. late 12th century – early 13th century) was the notary and chronicler of a Hungarian king, probably Béla III. Little is known about him, but his latinized name began with P, as he referred to himself as "P. dictus magister".

Anonymus is famous for his work Gesta Hungarorum ("The Deeds of the Hungarians"), written in Medieval Latin around 1200. This work provides the most detailed history of the Hungarian conquest of the Carpathian Basin. Most of his attempts to explain the origin of several Hungarian place names are unsupported by modern etymology.

== Identity ==
The identity of the author of the Gesta has always been subject to scholarly debate. Although the first words of the opening sentence—an initial "P" followed with the words "dictus magister ac quondam bone memorie gloriosissimi Bele regis Hungarie notarius"—describe him, they cannot be interpreted unambiguously. Primarily, the interpretation of the "P dictus magister" text is unclear. The text may refer to a man whose monogram was P or it may be an abbreviation of the Latin word for "aforementioned" (praedictus) in reference to a name on the title page which is now missing. Many scholars accept the former version, translating the text as "P who is called magister, and sometime notary of the most glorious Béla, king of Hungary of fond memory". However, sentence beginnings with "predictus" appear very frequently in the work, which could support the reading "aforementioned magister". The abbreviation sign that would normally appear when "pr(a)e" is shortened to "p" could well have been omitted in this case as the P was richly decorated as an initial.

In his 1937 study, historian Loránd Szilágyi identified Anonymus with a certain Peter, a canon, alter provost of the cathedral chapter of Esztergom. Several authors shared his view until 1966, when literary journal Irodalomtörténeti Közlemények published the papers of János Horváth, Jr. and Károly Sólyom, who claimed Anonymus was identical with Peter, Bishop of Győr. The renowned historian György Györffy refuted their theory in 1970 and considered authorship of a Peter who served as provost of Buda, despite the fact that there is no data on the existence of such a person.

== Statue ==
A statue of Anonymus was created by Miklós Ligeti in 1903, in the City Park of Budapest.

== Sources ==
- Anonymus, Notary of King Béla: The Deeds of the Hungarians (Edited, Translated and Annotated by Martyn Rady and László Veszprémy) (2010). In: Rady, Martyn; Veszprémy, László; Bak, János M. (2010); Anonymus and Master Roger; CEU Press; ISBN 978-963-9776-95-1. (Primary)
- Berend, Nora; Urbańczyk, Przemysław; Wiszewski, Przemysław (2013). Central Europe in the High Middle Ages: Bohemia, Hungary and Poland, c. 900-c. 1300. Cambridge University Press. ISBN 978-0-521-78156-5.
- Curta, Florin (2006). Southeastern Europe in the Middle Ages, 500–1250. Cambridge: Cambridge University Press. ISBN 978-0-521-81539-0.
- Engel, Pál (2001). The Realm of St Stephen: A History of Medieval Hungary, 895–1526. I.B. Tauris Publishers. ISBN 1-86064-061-3.
- Györffy, György (1988). Anonymus: Rejtély vagy történeti forrás [Anonymous: An Enigma or a Source for History] (in Hungarian). Akadémiai Kiadó. ISBN 963-05-4868-2.
- Macartney, C. A. (1953). The Medieval Hungarian Historians: A Critical & Analytical Guide. Cambridge University Press. ISBN 978-0-521-08051-4.
- Madgearu, Alexandru (2005). The Romanians in the Anonymous Gesta Hungarorum: Truth and Fiction. Romanian Cultural Institute, Center for Transylvanian Studies. ISBN 973-7784-01-4.
- Rady, Martyn; Veszprémy, László (2010). "Introduction". In Bak, János M.; Borkowska, Urszula; Constable, Giles; Jaritz, Gerhard; Klaniczay, Gábor (eds.). Anonymus and Master Roger. CEU Press. pp. xvii–xxxviii. ISBN 978-963-9776-95-1.
- Silagi, Gabriel (1991). Die "Gesta Hungarorum" des anonymen Notars. Ungarns Geschichtsschreiber (in German). Vol. 4. Sigmaringen: Jan Thorbecke. ISBN 3-7995-2910-1.
- Thoroczkay, Gábor (2009). Írások az Árpád-korról: Történeti és historiográfiai tanulmányok, 7. fejezet: Anonymusról - röviden [On the Age of the Árpáds: Historical and Historiographic Studies, Chapter 7: On Anonymous in short] (in Hungarian). L'Harmattan. ISBN 978-963-236-165-9.
