= Sebastian (archbishop of Esztergom) =

Hungarian missionary, prelate and politician

Sebestyén
- Archbishop of Esztergom
- Archdiocese: Archdiocese of Esztergom
- Appointed: 1002
- Term ended: 1007
- Predecessor: Dominic
- Successor: Astrik

Personal details
- Born: between 950 and 970
- Died: 1007
- Denomination: Chalcedonian Christianity (Roman Rite)

Blessed Sebestyén (died 1007), was a Hungarian Benedictine missionary, prelate and politician, who served as Archbishop of Esztergom between 1002 and 1007.

== Biography ==
According to the legend of Bishop Hartvik, Sebestyén (or Sebastian) was a Benedictine monk of the Abbey of Pannonhalma, who was promoted to the rank of Archbishop of Esztergom by King St. Stephen I of Hungary, after the death of Archbishop Dominic. For three years he suffered loss of vision, as a result he was replaced by Bishop Anastasius of Kalocsa (or Astrik). In 1005 he was healed, and sanctified the church of the monastery of Pannonhalma. Astrik, on the other hand, was rewarded by the Pope the title of Archbishop of Kalocsa, rising through the ranks the diocese to archdiocese.

The person of Sebestyén is discussed, it is believed he was the same missionary monk, known as Radla, who was a mentor and fellow evangelical work of St. Adalbert of Prague, who lived at the court of Grand Prince Géza since 995. Sebestyén built the chapel of St. Vitus in the castle of Esztergom.

== Bibliography ==
- Beke, Margit (2003). Esztergomi érsekek 1001-2003. Szent István Társulat. ISBN 9789633614723.

Sebestyén Died: 1007
Religious titles
Preceded by Dominic	Archbishop of Esztergom; 1002–1007	Succeeded by Astrik
