= Pécsvárad Abbey =

Monastery in Hungary

Coordinates: 46.1595°N 18.4124°E

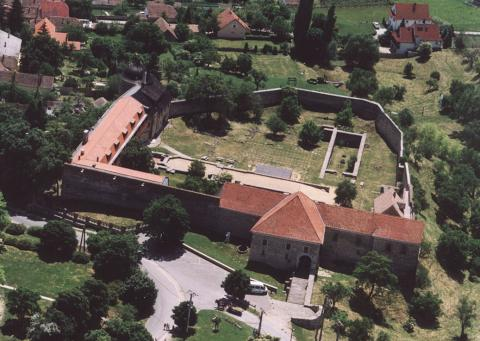
Remains of the Pécsvárad Abbey

The Pécsvárad Abbey was a Benedictine monastery established at Pécsvárad in the Kingdom of Hungary in the first decades of the 11th century. Its patrons were the Virgin Mary and Saint Benedict of Nursia.

== Foundation (1015–1038) ==
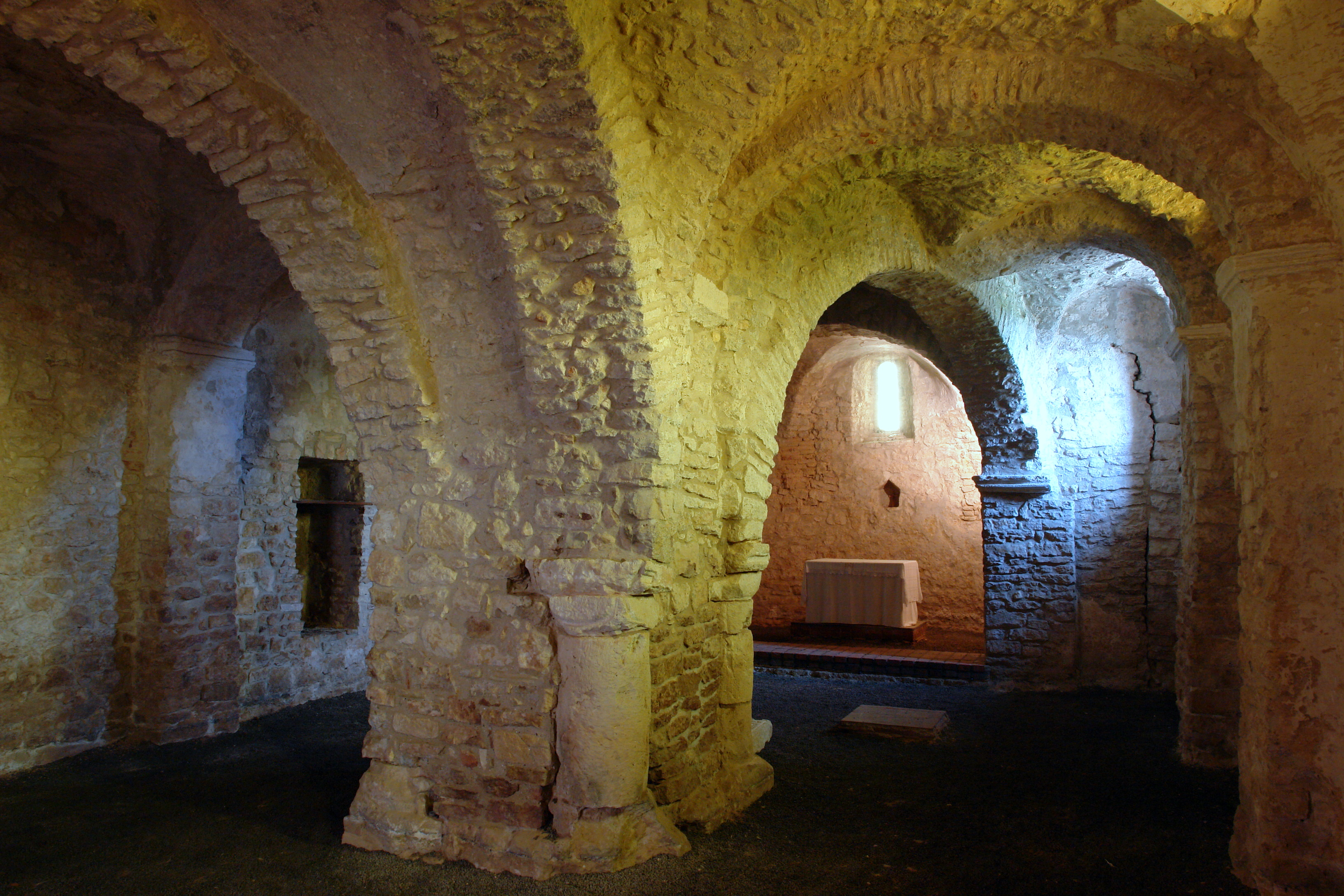
A two-storey chapel

The Roman Catholic Diocese of Pécs was established in 1009 with jurisdiction in the southern parts of Transdanubia within the Kingdom of Hungary. The historians Gergely Kiss and Gábor Sarbak write that the first Benedictine monks who settled in the diocese "may have lived" in community with the secular priests of the cathedral in Pécs. The monks moved to the nearby Pécsvárad at the foot of the Zengő Mountain in 1015. According to György Györffy, Pécsvárad was the center of a royal domain. The ruins of a two-storey chapel were unearthed at the monastery, but its dating is controversial: it may have been built between 997 and 1038, but an earlier or a later date neither can be excluded.

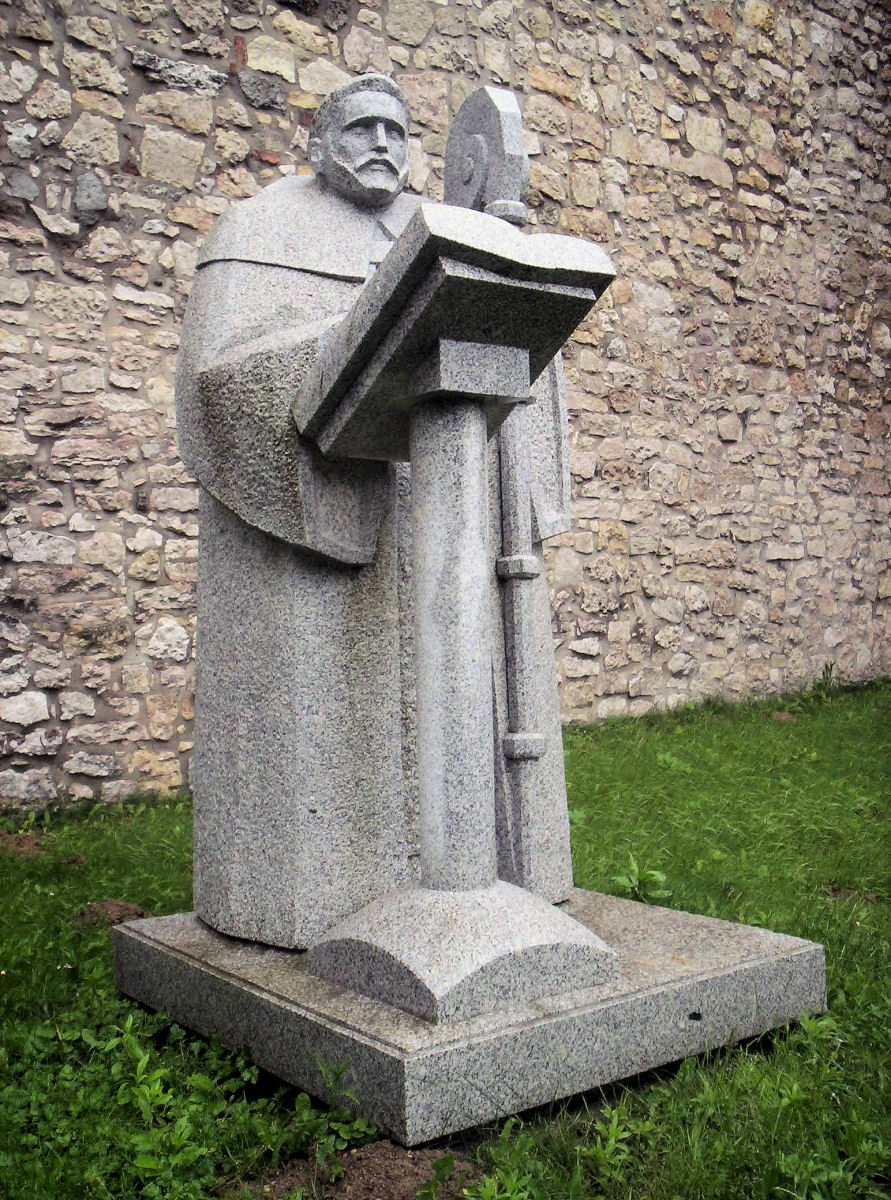
Modern sculpture of Astrik in Pécsvárad

A diploma of the foundation of the Pécsvárad Abbey – which was forged in the name of King Saint Stephen I of Hungary around 1220 – states that Astrik, one of Bishop Saint Adalbert of Prague's disciplines, was the monastery's first abbot. Gábor Thoroczkay writes that it was only the memory of Astrik's missionary work in the wider region of Pécsvárad which gave rise to his fame as the founding abbot of the monastery. On the other hand, György Györffy says that King Stephen granted his estates in Pécsvárad to Astrik who was a papal legate at that time. Györffy adds that the monastery was only set up in 1038, which is the year of the monastery's consecration, according to the Annales Posonienses. The Abbey's forged charter of foundation – which, according to László Koszta, reflects the circumstances around 1220 – writes that King Saint Stephen donated 42 villages to the monks. The monastery is dedicated to Saint Benedict and the Virgin Mary.

== Flourishing (1038–1410) ==
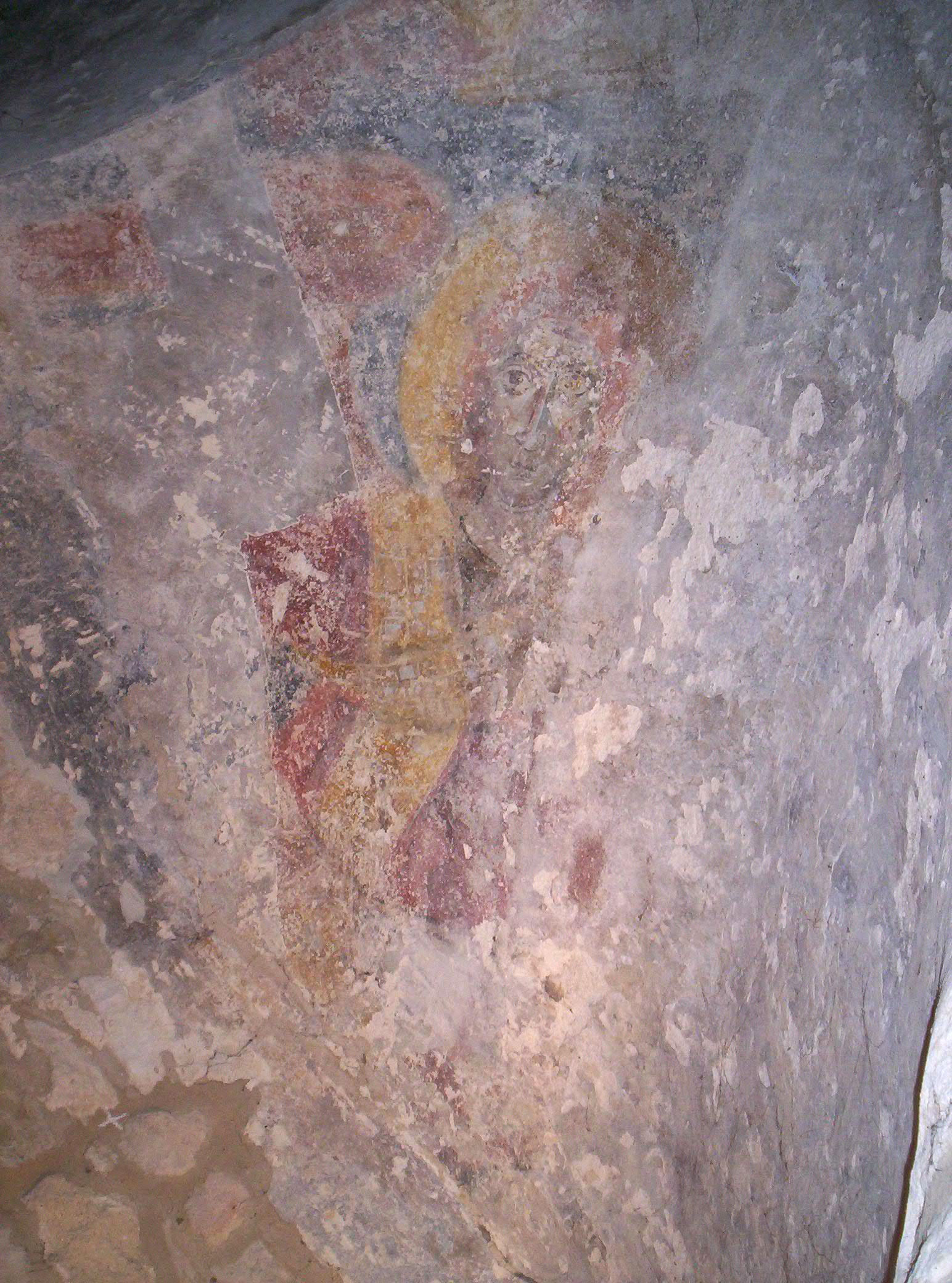
Fresco in the apse of the Pécsvárad Abbey

A fragment of a Byzantine Madonna, dated to the turn of the 11th and 12th centuries, was discovered in the apse of the monastery. The fresco on the walls of the apse was made in the 12th century.

== Sources ==
- Berend, Nora; Laszlovszky, József; Szakács, Béla Zsolt (2007). "The kingdom of Hungary". In Berend, Nora (ed.). Christianization and the Rise of Christian Monarchy: Scandinavia, Central Europe and Rus', c.900-1200. Cambridge University Press. pp. 319–368. ISBN 978-0-521-87616-2.
- Györffy, György (1994). King Saint Stephen of Hungary. Atlantic Research and Publications. ISBN 0-88033-300-6.
- Kiss, Gergely; Sarbak, Gábor (2009). "Szerzetesi intézmények: Pécsvárad [=Monastic institutions: Pécsvárad]". In Fedeles, Tamás; Sarbak, Gábor; Sümegi, József (eds.). A pécsi egyházmegye története I.: A középkor századai (1009–1543) [=A History of the Diocese of Pécs, Volume I: Medieval Centuries (1009–1543)] (in Hungarian). Fény Kft. pp. 346–349. ISBN 978-963-88572-0-0.
- Koszta, László (1994). "Pécsvárad". In Kristó, Gyula; Engel, Pál; Makk, Ferenc (eds.). Korai magyar történeti lexikon (9-14. század) [=Encyclopedia of the Early Hungarian History (9th-14th centuries)] (in Hungarian). Akadémiai Kiadó. pp. 539–540. ISBN 963-05-6722-9.
- Thoroczkay, Gábor (2001). "The Dioceses and Bishops of Saint Stephen". In Zsoldos, Attila (ed.). Saint Stephen and His Country: A Newborn Kingdom in Central Europe - Hungary. Lucidus Kiadó. pp. 49–68. ISBN 963-86163-9-3.
