= Black Hungarians =

Magyar group in the late 9th century

Black Hungarians (Latin: Ungri Nigri) or Black Magyars were a group of the Hungarians known during the second half of the 9th century.

Black Hungarians are mentioned in few contemporary sources—sometimes in opposition to White Hungarians. None of these sources expand upon the exact nature of the relationship between the Black Magyars and the "mainstream" Hungarian population, nor are the origin or meaning of their name clear. However, it is probable that they refer to the Kabars, a Turkic people who joined the Hungarians in the ninth century and lived as foreign auxiliaries in Transdanubia.

However, it is known that they participated in a military campaign in Kyiv; after the conquest, they resisted the Christian mission—even after the coronation of King Stephen I of Hungary in 1000/1001. In 1003, Bruno of Querfurt tried to convert the Black Hungarians; then the papal legate Azzo led the missionary work among Black Hungarians, however, the latter insisted on their pagan beliefs, resulting in the blinding of some of them.

Around 1008, King Stephen I launched a campaign against the Black Hungarians and conquered their territories, comprising Black Hungary.

== Sources ==
- Korai Magyar Történeti Lexikon (9-14. század), főszerkesztő: Kristó, Gyula, szerkesztők: Engel, Pál és Makk, Ferenc (Akadémiai Kiadó, Budapest, 1994)
- Tiborczszeghi-Horváth, Ottó (2007). "A fehér és fekete magyarok" [Black and White Hungarians]. frego.li (in Hungarian).
- Sisa, István (1983). "Who Are the Magyars?". The Spirit of Hungary: A Panorama of Hungarian History and Culture. Archived from the original on 22 March 2008.
- Makkai, László (2001). "From the Hungarian conquest to the Mongol invasion". History of Transylvania. Vol. 1.
