= Dominic (archbishop of Esztergom) =

Hungarian missionary, prelate and politician

Domonkos
- Archbishop of Esztergom
- Archdiocese: Archdiocese of Esztergom
- Appointed: 1000
- Term ended: 1002
- Predecessor: Archdiocese founded
- Successor: Sebastian

Personal details
- Born: c. 954 (?)
- Died: 1002
- Denomination: Roman Catholicism

Domonkos or Domokos (died 1002), was a Hungarian Benedictine missionary, prelate and politician, who served as the first Archbishop of Esztergom between 1000 and 1002.

== Biography ==
Date and exact place of his birth are unknown, but probably he was born around the year 954 in a region of Italy. About 1000 he was a Benedictine in Pannonhalma Archabbey. He was one of those who signed the letter of donation of the Abbey, along with King St. Stephen I. It is possible that he himself has crowned the Hungarian king as well, but no hard evidence exists of this. In 1001 St. Stephen founded the religious council of the archbishop of Esztergom, and the other six Hungarian bishoprics. Domonkos was also the Vice Chancellor of Stephen I, and coordinated evangelism of Hungary with many foreign priests. He died in 1002.

== Bibliography ==
- Beke, Margit (2003). Esztergomi érsekek 1001-2003. Szent István Társulat. ISBN 9789633614723.

Domonkos Died: 1002
Catholic Church titles
Preceded by first	Archbishop of Esztergom; 1000–1002	Succeeded by Sebastian
