= Stephen I of Hungary =

King of Hungary from 1000/1001 to 1038; Catholic saint

Saint Stephen I
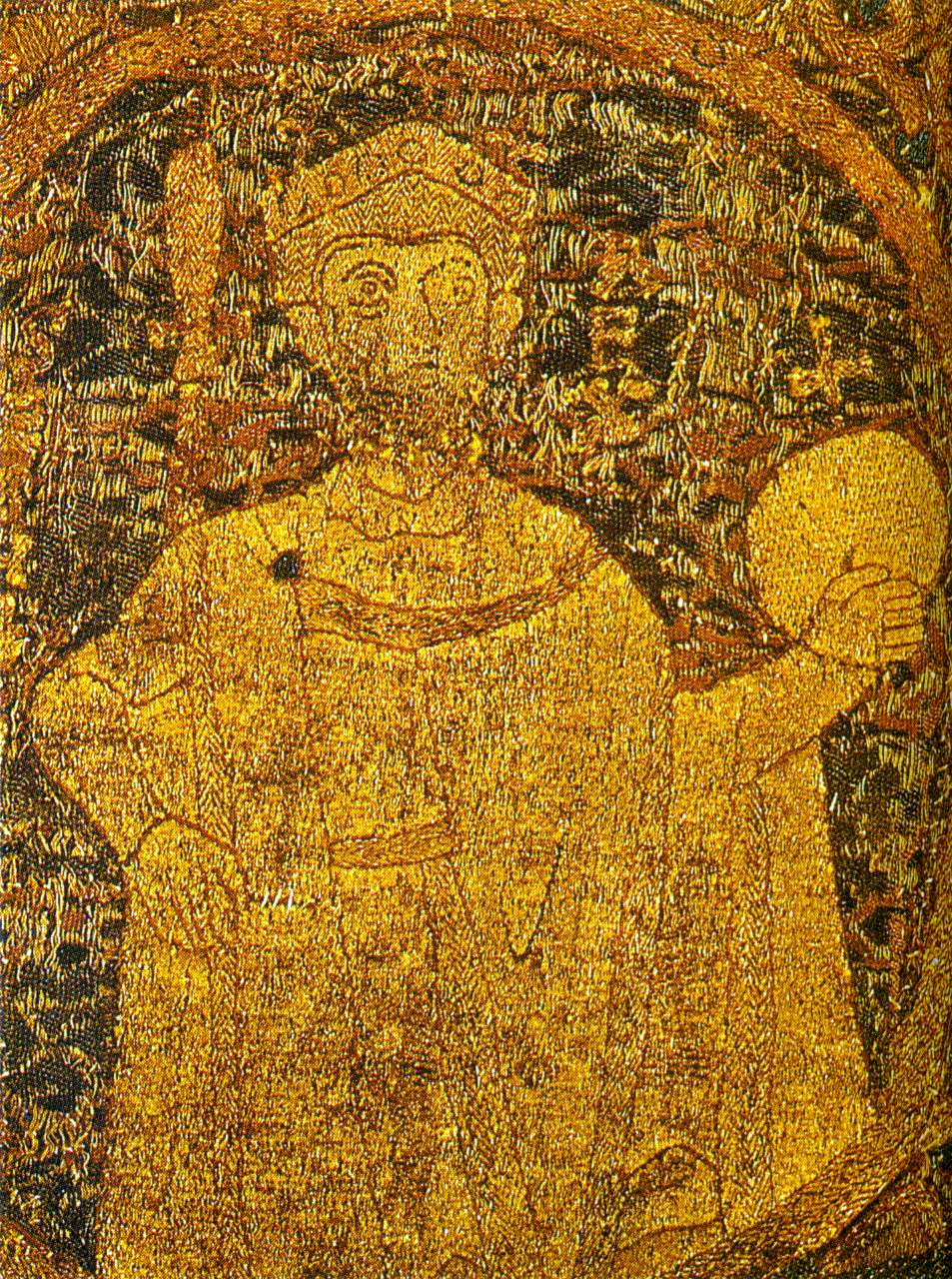
- Portrayal of Stephen I on the Hungarian coronation mantle (originally a chasuble) from 1031

King of Hungary
- Reign: 1000 or 1001–1038
- Coronation: 25 December 1000 or 1 January 1001
- Successor: Peter

Grand Prince of the Hungarians
- Reign: 997–1000 or 1001
- Predecessor: Géza
- Born: Vajk c. 975; Esztergom, Principality of Hungary
- Died: 15 August 1038 (aged 62–63); Esztergom or Székesfehérvár, Kingdom of Hungary
- Burial: Székesfehérvár Basilica
- Spouse: Gisela of Bavaria (m. 996)
- Issue: Otto; Saint Emeric
- Dynasty: Árpád
- Father: Géza of Hungary
- Mother: Sarolt

Stephen I, also known as King Saint Stephen (Hungarian: Szent István király [ˌsɛnt ˈiʃtvaːn kiraːj]; Latin: Sanctus Stephanus; Slovak: Štefan I. or Štefan Veľký; c. 975 – 15 August 1038), was the last grand prince of the Hungarians between 997 and 1000 or 1001, and the first king of Hungary from 1000 or 1001 until his death in 1038. The year of his birth is uncertain, but many details of his life suggest that he was born in, or after, 975, in Esztergom. He was given the pagan name Vajk at birth, but the date of his baptism is unknown. He was the only son of Grand Prince Géza and his wife, Sarolt, who was descended from a prominent family of gyulas. Although both of his parents were baptized, Stephen was the first member of his family to become a devout Christian. He married Gisela of Bavaria, a scion of the imperial Ottonian dynasty.

After succeeding his father in 997, Stephen had to fight for the throne against his relative, Koppány, who was supported by large numbers of pagan warriors. He defeated Koppány with the assistance of foreign knights including Vecelin, Hont and Pázmány, and native lords. He was crowned on 25 December 1000 or 1 January 1001 with a crown sent by Pope Sylvester II. In a series of wars against semi-independent tribes and chieftains—including the Black Hungarians and his uncle, Gyula the Younger—he unified the Carpathian Basin. He protected the independence of his kingdom by forcing the invading troops of Conrad II, Holy Roman Emperor, to withdraw from Hungary in 1030.

Stephen established at least one archbishopric, six bishoprics and three Benedictine monasteries, leading the Church in Hungary to develop independently from the archbishops of the Holy Roman Empire. He encouraged the spread of Christianity by meting out severe punishments for ignoring Christian customs. His system of local administration was based on counties organized around fortresses and administered by royal officials. Hungary enjoyed a lasting period of peace during his reign and became a preferred route for pilgrims and merchants traveling between Western Europe, the Holy Land and Constantinople.

Stephen survived all of his children, dying on 15 August 1038, aged 62 or 63. He was buried in his new basilica, built in Székesfehérvár and dedicated to the Holy Virgin. His death was followed by civil wars which lasted for decades. He was canonized by Pope Gregory VII, together with his son Emeric and Bishop Gerard of Csanád, in 1083. Stephen is a popular saint in Hungary and neighboring territories. In Hungary, his feast day (celebrated on 20 August) is also a public holiday commemorating the foundation of the state, known as State Foundation Day.

== Early years (c. 975–997) ==
Stephen's birth date is uncertain as it was not recorded in contemporaneous documents. Hungarian and Polish chronicles written centuries later give three different years: 967, 969 and 975. The unanimous testimony of his three late 11th-century or early 12th-century hagiographies and other Hungarian sources, which state that Stephen was "still an adolescent" in 997, substantiate the reliability of the latest year (975). Stephen's Lesser Legend adds that he was born in Esztergom, which implies that he was born after 972 because his father, Géza, Grand Prince of the Hungarians, chose Esztergom as royal residence around that year. Géza promoted the spread of Christianity among his subjects by force, but never ceased worshipping pagan gods. Both his son's Greater Legend and the nearly contemporaneous Thietmar of Merseburg described Géza as a cruel monarch, suggesting that he was a despot who mercilessly consolidated his authority over the rebellious Hungarian lords.

Hungarian chronicles agree that Stephen's mother was Sarolt, daughter of Gyula, a Hungarian chieftain with jurisdiction either in Transylvania or in the wider region of the confluence of the rivers Tisza and Maros. Many historians—including Pál Engel and Gyula Kristó—propose that her father was identical with "Gylas", who had been baptized in Constantinople around 952 and "remained faithful to Christianity", according to Byzantine chronicler John Skylitzes. However, this identification is not unanimously accepted; historian György Györffy states that it was not Sarolt's father, but his younger brother, who was baptized in the Byzantine capital. In contrast with all Hungarian sources, the Polish-Hungarian Chronicle and later Polish sources state that Stephen's mother was Adelhaid, an otherwise unknown sister of Duke Mieszko I of Poland, but the reliability of this report is not accepted by modern historians.

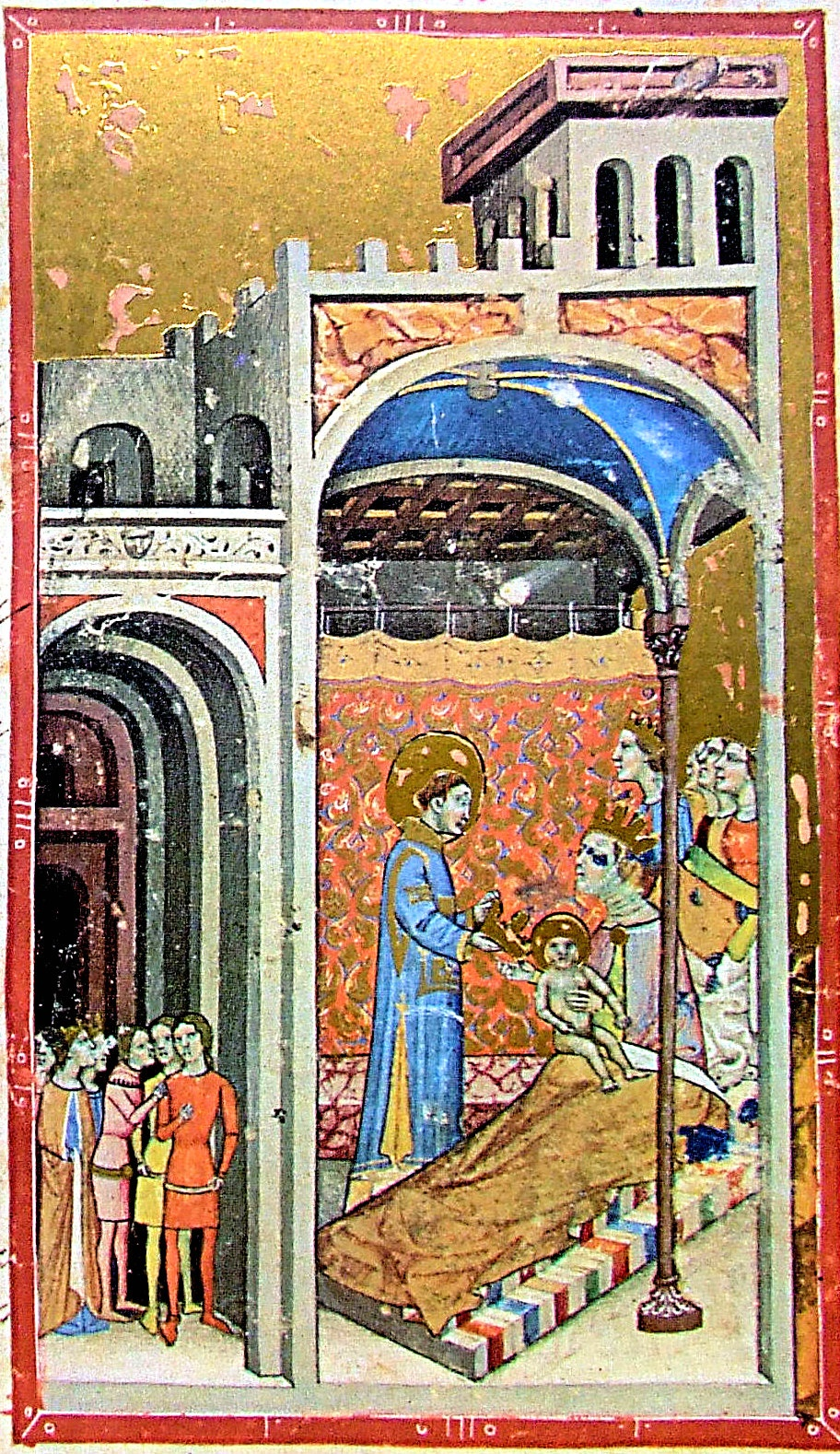
Stephen's birth depicted in the Illuminated Chronicle

Stephen was born as Vajk, a name derived from the Turkic word baj, meaning "hero", "master", "prince" or "rich". Stephen's Greater Legend narrates that he was baptized by the saintly Bishop Adalbert of Prague, who stayed in Géza's court several times between 983 and 994. However, Saint Adalbert's nearly contemporaneous Legend, written by Bruno of Querfurt, does not mention this event. Accordingly, the date of Stephen's baptism is unknown: Györffy argues that he was baptized soon after birth, while Kristó proposes that he only received baptism just before his father's death in 997.

Stephen's official hagiography, written by Bishop Hartvic and sanctioned by Pope Innocent III, narrates that he "was fully instructed in the knowledge of the grammatical art" in his childhood. This implies that he studied Latin, though some scepticism is warranted as few kings of this era were able to write. His two other late 11th-century hagiographies do not mention any grammatical studies, stating only that he "was brought up by receiving an education appropriate for a little prince". Kristó says that the latter remark only refers to Stephen's physical training, including his participation in hunts and military actions. According to the Illuminated Chronicle, one of his tutors was a Count Deodatus from Italy, who later founded a monastery in Tata.

According to Stephen's legends, Grand Prince Géza convoked an assembly of the Hungarian chieftains and warriors when Stephen "ascended to the first stage of adolescence", at the age of 14 or 15. Géza nominated Stephen as his successor and all those present took an oath of loyalty to the young prince. Györffy writes, without identifying his source, that Géza appointed his son to rule the "Nyitra ducate" around that time. Slovak historians, including Ján Steinhübel and Ján Lukačka, accept Györffy's view and propose that Stephen administered Nyitra (now Nitra, Slovakia) from around 995.

Géza arranged Stephen's marriage to Gisela, daughter of Henry II, Duke of Bavaria, in or after 995. This marriage established the first family link between a Hungarian ruler and a Western European ruling house, as Gisela was closely related to the Ottonian dynasty of Holy Roman Emperors. According to popular tradition preserved in the Scheyern Abbey in Bavaria, the ceremony took place at the Scheyern castle and was celebrated by Saint Adalbert. Gisela was accompanied to her new home by Bavarian knights, many of whom received land grants from her husband and settled in Hungary, helping to strengthen Stephen's military position. According to Györffy, Stephen and his wife "presumably" settled in Nyitra after their marriage.

== Reign (997–1038) ==
=== Grand Prince (997–1000) ===
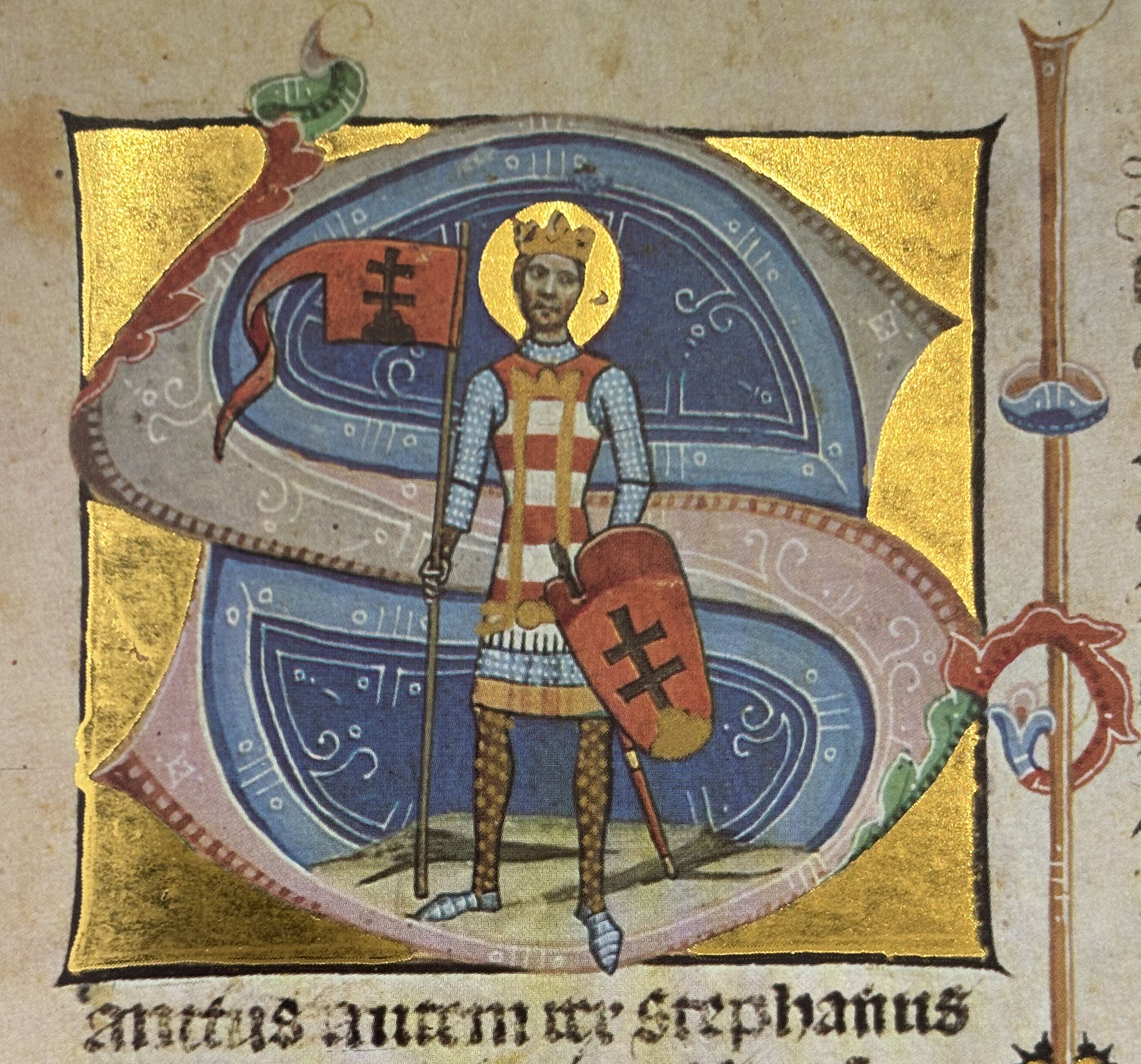
King Stephen is depicted in military attire. He holds a banner and a shield, both bearing the coat of arms with the double cross on a triple mount, symbolizing his status as an Apostolic King (Illuminated Chronicle)

Grand Prince Géza died in 997. Stephen convoked an assembly at Esztergom where his supporters declared him grand prince. Initially, he only controlled the northwestern regions of the Carpathian Basin; the rest of the territory was still dominated by tribal chieftains. Stephen's ascension to the throne was in line with the principle of primogeniture, which prescribed that a father was succeeded by his son. On the other hand, it contradicted the traditional idea of seniority, according to which Géza should have been succeeded by the most senior member of the Árpád dynasty, which was Koppány at that time. Koppány, who held the title Duke of Somogy, had for many years administered the regions of Transdanubia south of Lake Balaton.

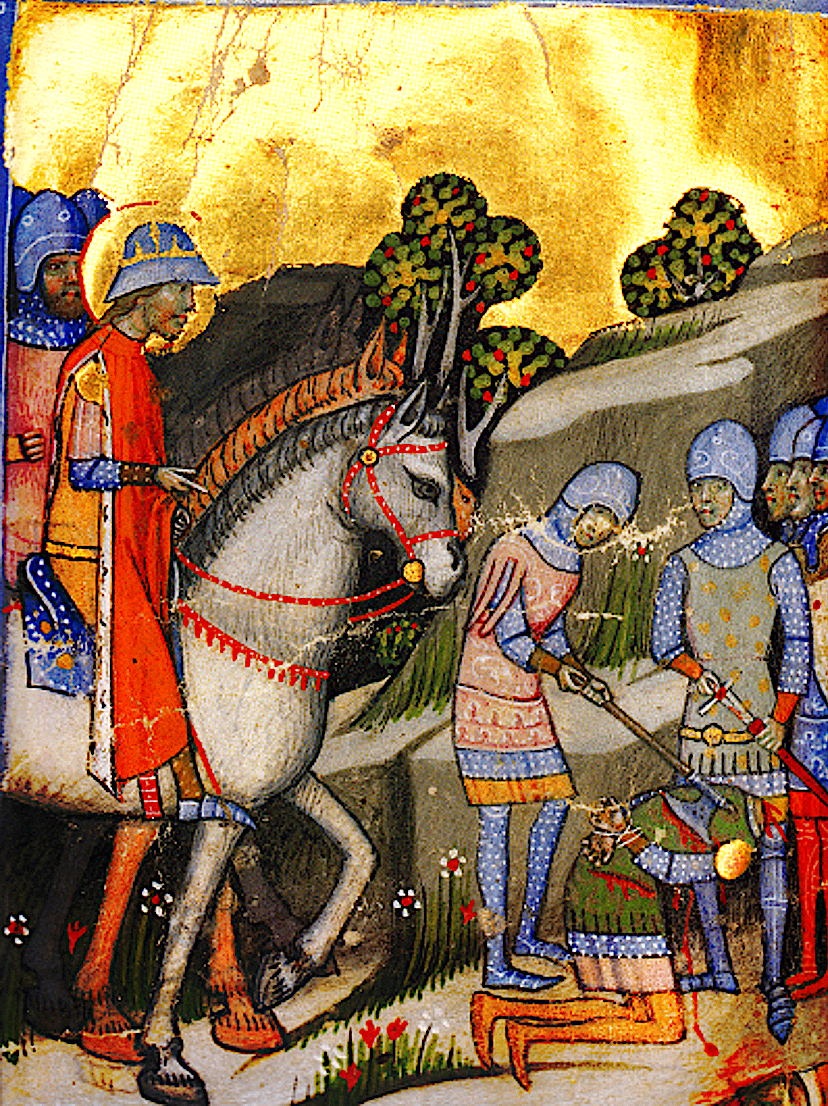
Koppány's execution after his defeat by Stephen, depicted in the Chronicon Pictum

Koppány proposed to Géza's widow, Sarolt, in accordance with the pagan custom of levirate marriage. He also announced his claim to the throne. Although it is not impossible that Koppány had already been baptized, in 972, most of his supporters were pagans, opponents of the Christianity represented by Stephen and his predominantly German retinue. A charter of 1002 for the Pannonhalma Archabbey writes of a war between "the Germans and the Hungarians" when referring to the armed conflicts between Stephen and Koppány. Even so, Györffy says that Oszlar ("Alan"), Besenyő ("Pecheneg"), Kér and other place names, referring to ethnic groups or Hungarian tribes in Transdanubia around the supposed borders of Koppány's duchy, suggest that significant auxiliary units and groups of Hungarian warriors—who had been settled there by Grand Prince Géza—fought in Stephen's army.

Kristó states that the entire conflict between Stephen and Koppány was only a feud between two members of the Árpád dynasty, with no effect on other Hungarian tribal leaders. Koppány and his troops invaded the northern regions of Transdanubia, took many of Stephen's forts and plundered his lands. Stephen, who, according to the Illuminated Chronicle, "was for the first time girded with his sword", placed the brothers Hont and Pázmány at the head of his own guard and nominated Vecelin to lead the royal army. The last was a German knight who had come to Hungary in the reign of Géza. Hont and Pázmány were, according to Simon of Kéza's Gesta Hunnorum et Hungarorum and the Illuminated Chronicle, "knights of Swabian origin" who settled in Hungary either under Géza or in the first years of Stephen's reign. On the other hand, Lukačka and other Slovak historians say that Hont and Pázmány were "Slovak" noblemen who had joined Stephen during his rule in Nyitra.

Koppány was besieging Veszprém when he was informed of the arrival of Stephen's army. In the ensuing battle, Stephen won a decisive victory over his enemies. Koppány was killed on the battlefield. His body was quartered and its parts were displayed at the gates of the forts of Esztergom, Győr, Gyulafehérvár (Alba Iulia, Romania) and Veszprém in order to threaten all of those who were conspiring against the young monarch.

Stephen occupied Koppány's duchy and granted large estates to his own partisans. He also prescribed that Koppány's former subjects were to pay tithes to the Pannonhalma Archabbey, according to the deed of the foundation of this monastery which has been preserved in a manuscript containing interpolations. The same document declares that "there were no other bishoprics and monasteries in Hungary" at that time. On the other hand, the nearly contemporary Bishop Thietmar of Merseburg stated that Stephen "established bishoprics in his kingdom" before being crowned king. If the latter report is valid, the dioceses of Veszprém and Győr are the most probable candidates, according to historian Gábor Thoroczkay.

=== Coronation (1000–1001) ===
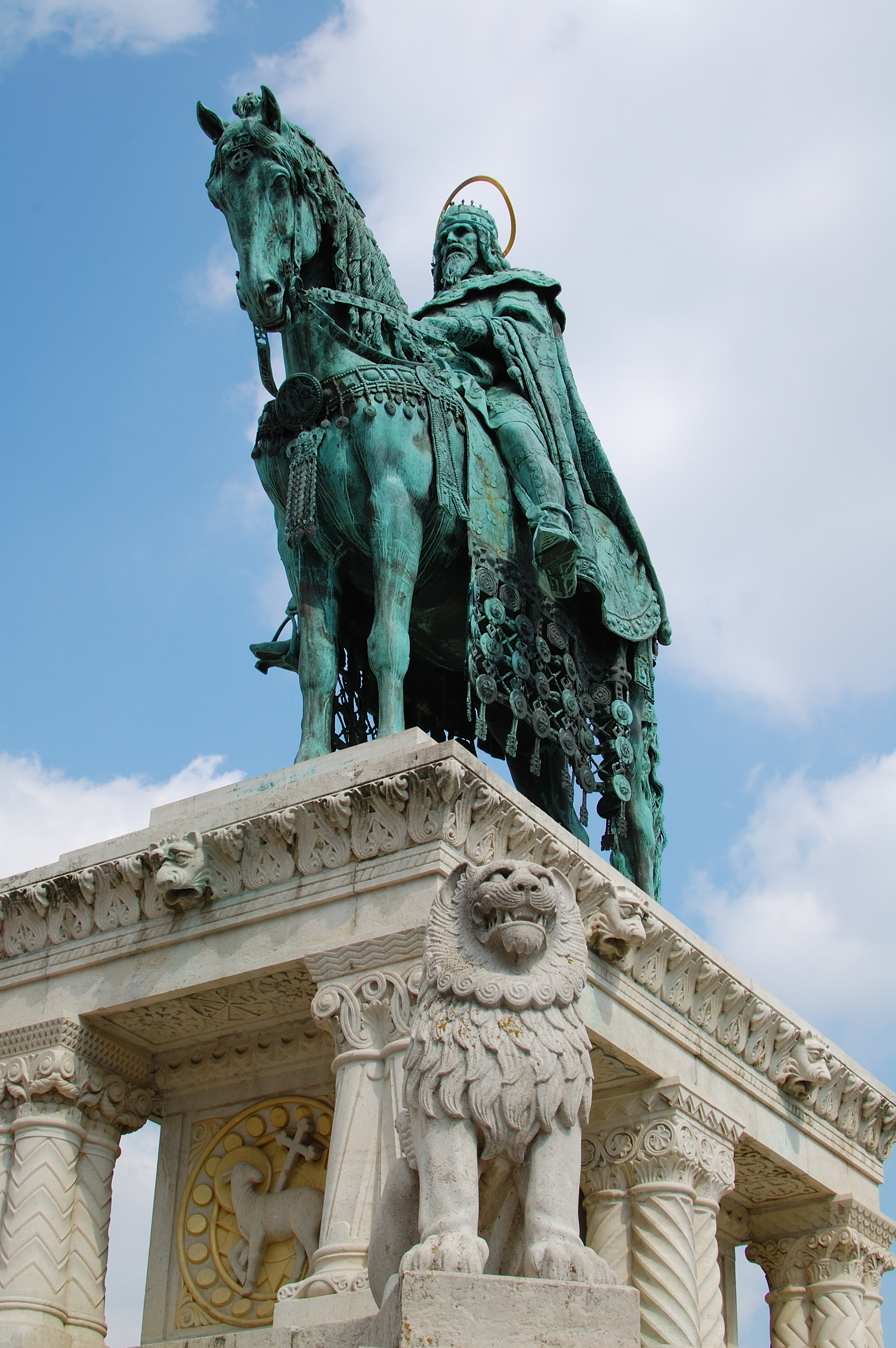
King Saint Stephen's modern sculpture in Budapest

By ordering the display of one part of Koppány's quartered corpse in Gyulafehérvár, the seat of his maternal uncle, Gyula the Younger, Stephen asserted his claim to rule all lands dominated by Hungarian lords. He also decided to strengthen his international status by adopting the title of king. However, the exact circumstances of his coronation and its political consequences are subject to scholarly debate.

Thietmar of Merseburg writes that Stephen received the crown "with the favour and urging" of Emperor Otto III (r. 996–1002), implying that Stephen accepted the Emperor's suzerainty before his coronation. On the other hand, all of Stephen's legends emphasize that he received his crown from Pope Sylvester II (r. 999–1003). Kristó and other historians point out that Pope Sylvester and Emperor Otto were close allies, which implies that both reports are valid: Stephen "received the crown and consecration" from the Pope, but not without the Emperor's consent. Around 75 years after the coronation, Pope Gregory VII (r. 1075–1085), who claimed suzerainty over Hungary, declared that Stephen had "offered and devotedly surrendered" Hungary "to Saint Peter" (that is, to the Holy See). In a contrasting report, Stephen's Greater Legend states that the King offered Hungary to the Virgin Mary. Modern historians—including Pál Engel, and Miklós Molnár—write that Stephen always asserted his sovereignty and never accepted papal or imperial suzerainty. For instance, none of his charters were dated according to the years of the reign of the contemporary emperors, which would have been the case if he had been their vassal. Furthermore, Stephen declared in the preamble to his First Book of Laws that he governed his realm "by the will of God".

The exact date of Stephen's coronation is unknown. According to later Hungarian tradition, he was crowned on the first day of the second millennium, which may refer either to 25 December 1000 or to 1 January 1001. Details of Stephen's coronation preserved in his Greater Legend suggest that the ceremony, which took place in Esztergom or Székesfehérvár followed the rite of the coronation of the German kings. Accordingly, Stephen was anointed with consecrated oil during the ceremony. Stephen's portrait, preserved on his royal cloak from 1031, shows that his crown, like the Holy Roman Emperor's diadem, was a hoop crown decorated with gemstones.

Besides his crown, Stephen regarded a spear with a flag as an important symbol of his sovereignty. For instance, his first coins bear the inscription LANCEA REGIS ("the king's spear") and depict an arm holding a spear with flag. According to the contemporaneous Adémar de Chabannes, a spear had been given to Stephen's father by Emperor Otto III as a token of Géza's right to "enjoy the most freedom in the possession of his country". Stephen is styled in various ways—Ungarorum rex ("king of the Hungarians"), Pannoniorum rex ("king of the Pannonians") or Hungarie rex ("king of Hungary")—in his charters.

=== Consolidation (1001–c. 1009) ===
Although Stephen's power did not rely on his coronation, the ceremony granted him the internationally accepted legitimacy of a Christian monarch who ruled his realm "by the Grace of God". All his legends testify that he established an archbishopric with its see in Esztergom shortly after his coronation. This act ensured that the Church in Hungary became independent of the prelates of the Holy Roman Empire. The earliest reference to an archbishop of Esztergom, named Dominic, has been preserved in the deed of foundation of the Pannonhalma Archabbey from 1002. According to historian Gábor Thoroczkay, Stephen also established the Diocese of Kalocsa in 1001. Stephen invited foreign priests to Hungary to evangelize his kingdom. Associates of the late Adalbert of Prague, including Radla and Astrik, arrived in Hungary in the first years of his reign. The presence of an unnamed "Archbishop of the Hungarians" at the synod of 1007 of Frankfurt and the consecration of an altar in Bamberg in 1012 by Archbishop Astrik show that Stephen's prelates maintained a good relationship with the clergy of the Holy Roman Empire.

The transformation of Hungary into a Christian state was one of Stephen's principal concerns throughout his reign. Although the Hungarians' conversion had already begun in his father's reign, it was only Stephen who systematically forced his subjects to give up their pagan rituals. His legislative activity was closely connected with Christianity. For example, his First Book of Laws from the first years of his reign includes several provisions prescribing the observance of feast days and the confession before death. His other laws protected property rights and the interests of widows and orphans, or regulated the status of serfs.

If someone has such a hardened heart—God forbid it to any Christian—that he does not want to confess his faults according to the counsel of a priest, he shall lie without any divine service and alms like an infidel. If his relatives and neighbors fail to summon the priest, and therefore he should die unconfessed, prayers and alms should be offered, but his relatives shall wash away their negligence by fasting in accordance with the judgement of the priests. Those who die a sudden death shall be buried with all ecclesiastical honor; for divine judgment is hidden from us and unknown.

— Laws of King Stephen I

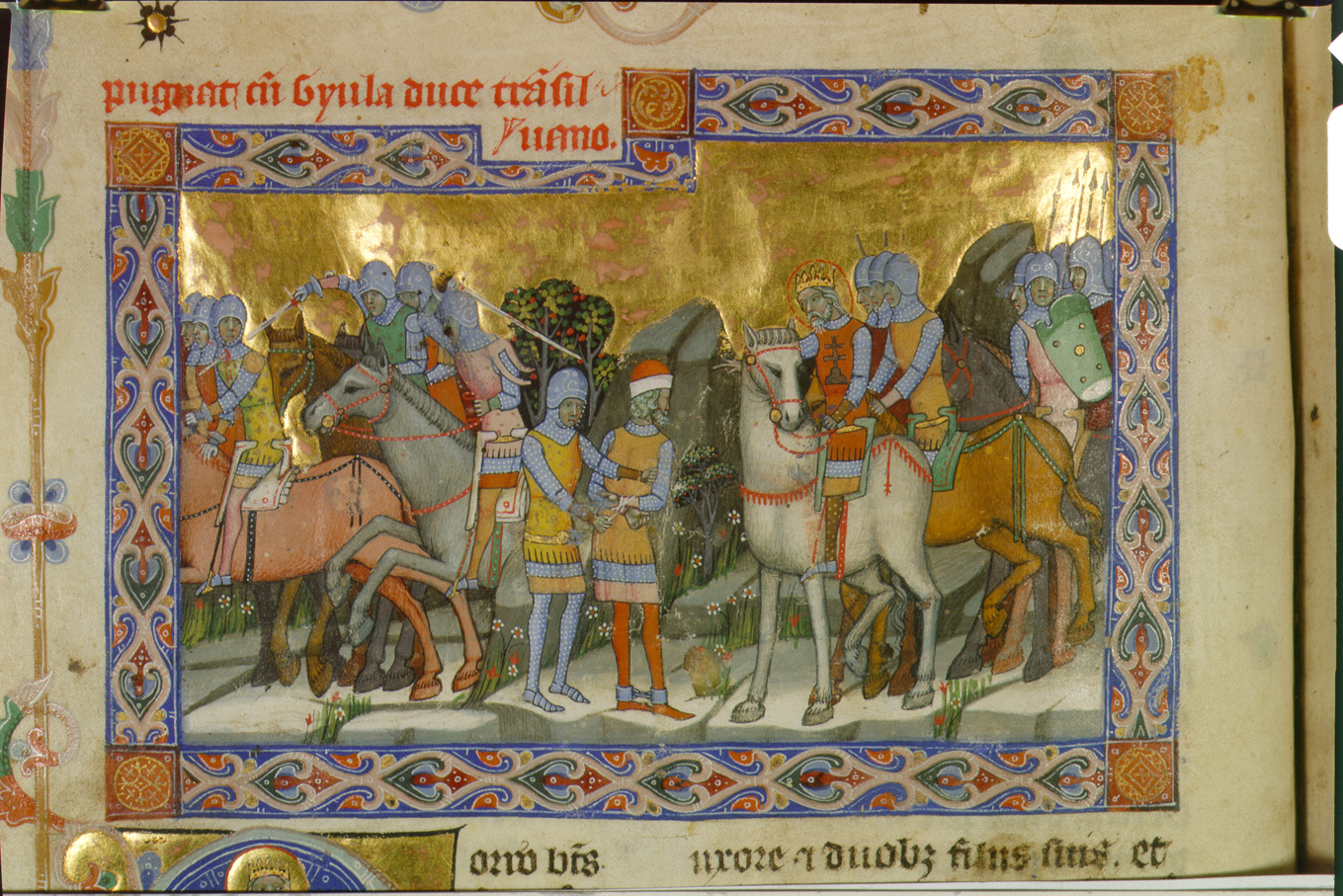
Stephen's forces seize his uncle, Gyula the Younger

Many Hungarian lords refused to accept Stephen's suzerainty even after his coronation. The new King first turned against his own uncle, Gyula the Younger, whose realm "was most wide and rich", according to the Illuminated Chronicle. Stephen invaded Transylvania and seized Gyula and his family around 1002 or in 1003. The contemporary Annals of Hildesheim adds that Stephen converted his uncle's "country to the Christian faith by force" after its conquest. Accordingly, historians date the establishment of the Diocese of Transylvania to this period. If the identification, proposed by Kristó, Györffy and other Hungarian historians, of Gyula with one Prokui—who was Stephen's uncle according to Thietmar of Merseburg—is valid, Gyula later escaped from captivity and fled to Bolesław I the Brave, Duke of Poland (r. 992–1025).

[Duke Bolesław the Brave's] territory included a certain burg, located near the border with the Hungarians. Its guardian was lord Prokui, an uncle of the Hungarian king. Both in the past and more recently, Prokui had been driven from his lands by the king and his wife had been taken captive. When he was unable to free her, his nephew arranged for her unconditional release, even though he was Prokui's enemy. I have never heard of anyone who showed such restraint towards a defeated foe. Because of this, God repeatedly granted him victory, not only in the burg mentioned above, but in others as well.

— Thietmar of Merseburg, Chronicon

About a hundred years later, the chronicler Gallus Anonymus also made mention of armed conflicts between Stephen and Bolesław, stating that the latter "defeated the Hungarians in battle and made himself master of all their lands as far as the Danube". Györffy says that the chronicler's report refers to the occupation of the valley of the river Morava—a tributary of the Danube—by the Poles in the 1010s. On the other hand, the Polish-Hungarian Chronicle states that the Polish duke occupied large territories north of the Danube and east of the Morava as far as Esztergom in the early 11th century. According to Steinhübel, the latter source proves that a significant part of the lands that now form Slovakia were under Polish rule between 1002 and 1030. In contrast with the Slovak historian, Györffy writes that this late chronicle "in which one absurdity follows another" contradicts all facts known from 11th-century sources.

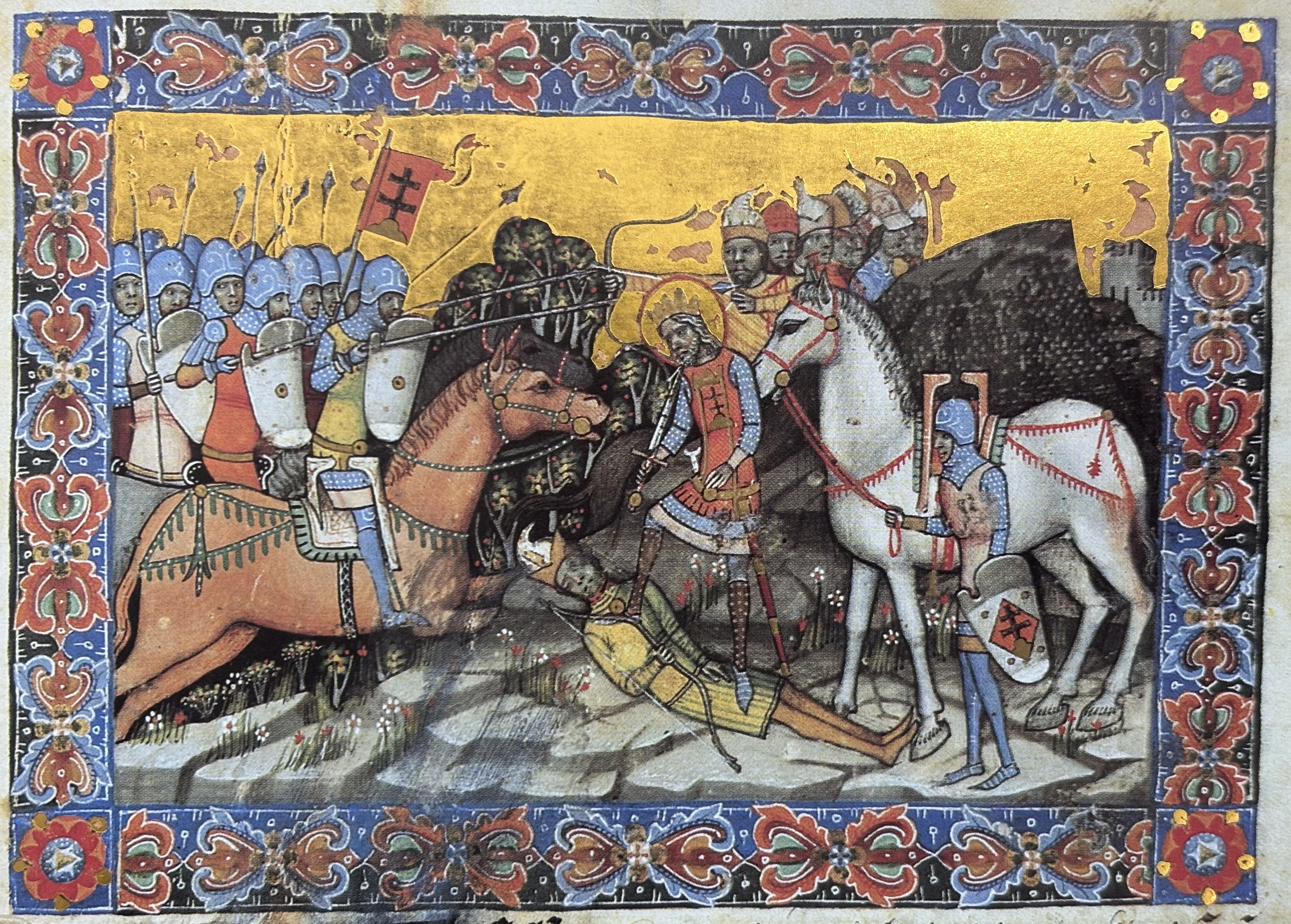
Stephen defeats Kean "Duke of the Bulgarians and Slavs"

The Illuminated Chronicle narrates that Stephen "led his army against Kean, Duke of the Bulgarians and Slavs whose lands are by their natural position most strongly fortified" following the occupation of Gyula's country. According to a number of historians, including Zoltán Lenkey and Gyula Kristó, Kean was the head of a small state located in the southern parts of Transylvania and Stephen occupied his country around 1003. Other historians, including Györffy, say that the chronicle's report preserved the memory of Stephen's campaign against Bulgaria in the late 1010s.

Likewise, the identification of the "Black Hungarians"—who were mentioned by Bruno of Querfurt and Adémar de Chabannes among the opponents of Stephen's proselytizing policy—is uncertain. Györffy locates their lands to the east of the river Tisza; while Thoroczkay says they live in the southern parts of Transdanubia. Bruno of Querfurt's report of the Black Hungarians' conversion by force suggests that Stephen conquered their lands at the latest in 1009 when "the first mission of Saint Peter"—a papal legate, Cardinal Azo—arrived in Hungary. The latter attended the meeting in Győr where the royal charter determining the borders of the newly established Bishopric of Pécs was issued on 23 August 1009.

The Diocese of Eger was also set up around 1009. According to Thoroczkay, "it is very probable" that the bishopric's establishment was connected with the conversion of the Kabars—an ethnic group of Khazar origin— and their chieftain. The head of the Kabars—who was either Samuel Aba or his father— married Stephen's unnamed younger sister on this occasion. The Aba clan was the most powerful among the native families who joined Stephen and supported him in his efforts to establish a Christian monarchy. The reports by Anonymus, Simon of Kéza and other Hungarian chroniclers of the Bár-Kalán, Csák and other 13th-century noble families descending from Hungarian chieftains suggest that other native families were also involved in the process.

Stephen set up a territory-based administrative system, establishing counties. Each county, headed by a royal official known as a count or ispán, was an administrative unit organized around a royal fortress. Most fortresses were earthworks in this period, but the castles at Esztergom, Székesfehérvár and Veszprém were built of stone. Forts serving as county seats also became the nuclei of Church organization. The settlements developing around them, where markets were held on each Sunday, were important local economic centers.

=== Wars with Poland and Bulgaria (c. 1009–1018) ===
Stephen's brother-in-law, Henry II, became King of Germany in 1002 and Holy Roman Emperor in 1013. Their friendly relationship ensured that the western borders of Hungary experienced a period of peace in the first decades of the 11th century. Even when Henry II's discontented brother, Bruno, sought refuge in Hungary in 1004, Stephen preserved the peace with Germany and negotiated a settlement between his two brothers-in-law. Around 1009, he gave his younger sister in marriage to Otto Orseolo, Doge of Venice (r. 1008–1026), a close ally of the Byzantine Emperor, Basil II (r. 976–1025), which suggests that Hungary's relationship with the Byzantine Empire was also peaceful. On the other hand, the alliance between Hungary and the Holy Roman Empire brought her into a war with Poland lasting from around 1014 until 1018. The Poles occupied the Hungarian posts along the river Morava. Györffy and Kristó write that a Pecheneg incursion into Transylvania, the memory of which has been preserved in Stephen's legends, also took place in this period, because the Pechenegs were close allies of the Polish duke's brother-in-law, Grand Prince Sviatopolk I of Kiev (r. 1015–1019).

Poland and the Holy Roman Empire concluded the Peace of Bautzen in January 1018. Later in the same year, 500 Hungarian horsemen accompanied Bolesław of Poland to Kiev, suggesting that Hungary had been included in the peace treaty. The historian Ferenc Makk says that the Peace of Bautzen obliged Bolesław to hand over all the territories he had occupied in the Morava valley to Stephen. According to Leodvin, the first known Bishop of Bihar (r. c. 1050 – c. 1060), Stephen allied with the Byzantines and led a military expedition to assist them against "barbarians" in the Balkan Peninsula. The Byzantine and Hungarian troops jointly took "Cesaries" which Györffy identifies as the present-day town of Ohrid. Leodvin's report suggests that Stephen joined the Byzantines in the war ending with their conquest of Bulgaria in 1018. However, the exact date of his expedition is uncertain. Györffy argues that it was only in the last year of the war that Stephen led his troops against the Bulgarians.

=== Domestic policies (1018–1024) ===
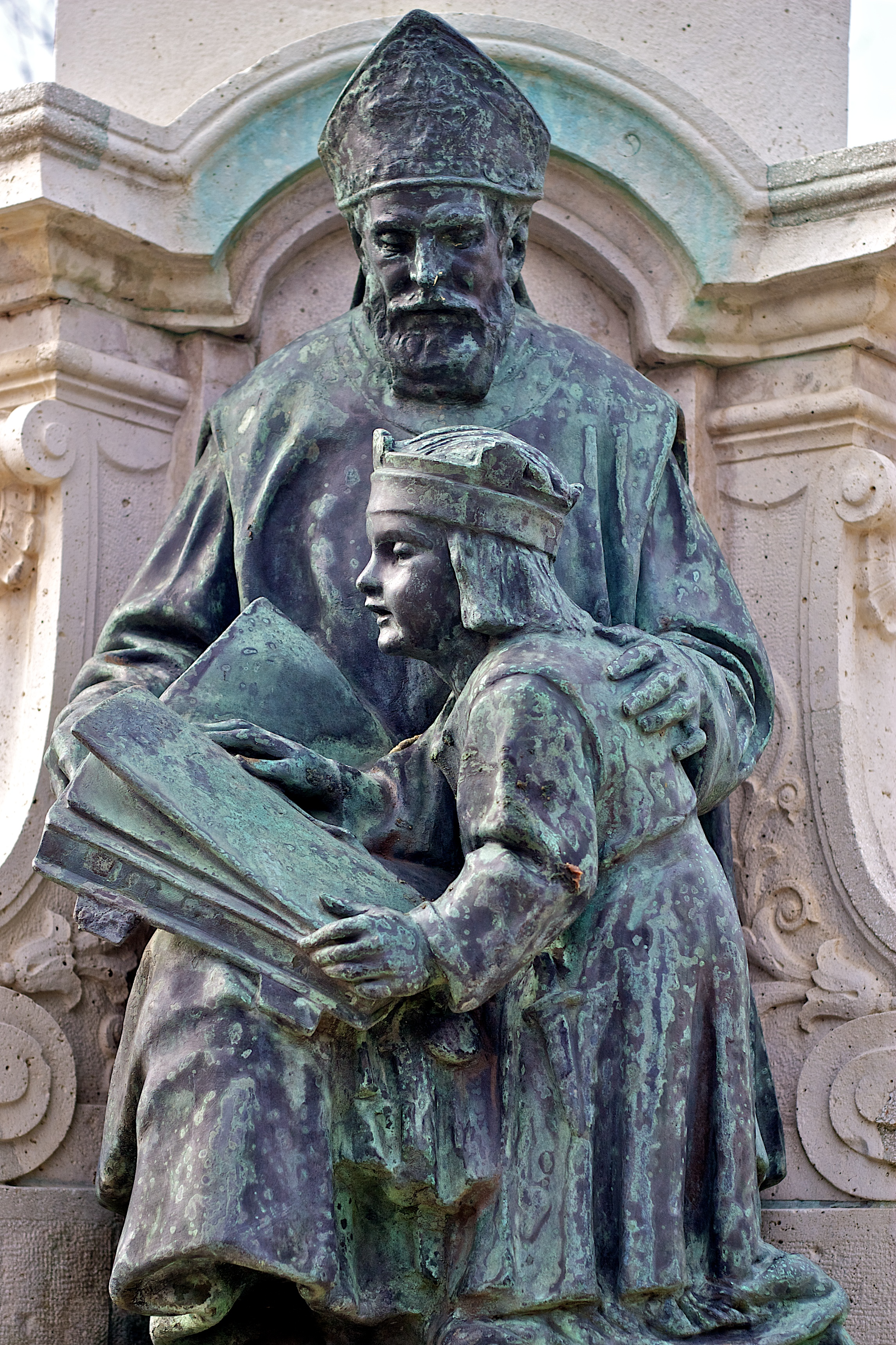
Modern statute of Bishop Gerard of Csanád and his disciple, Prince Emeric (both were canonized along with King Stephen in 1083). Püspökkút-statue in Székesfehérvár, installment

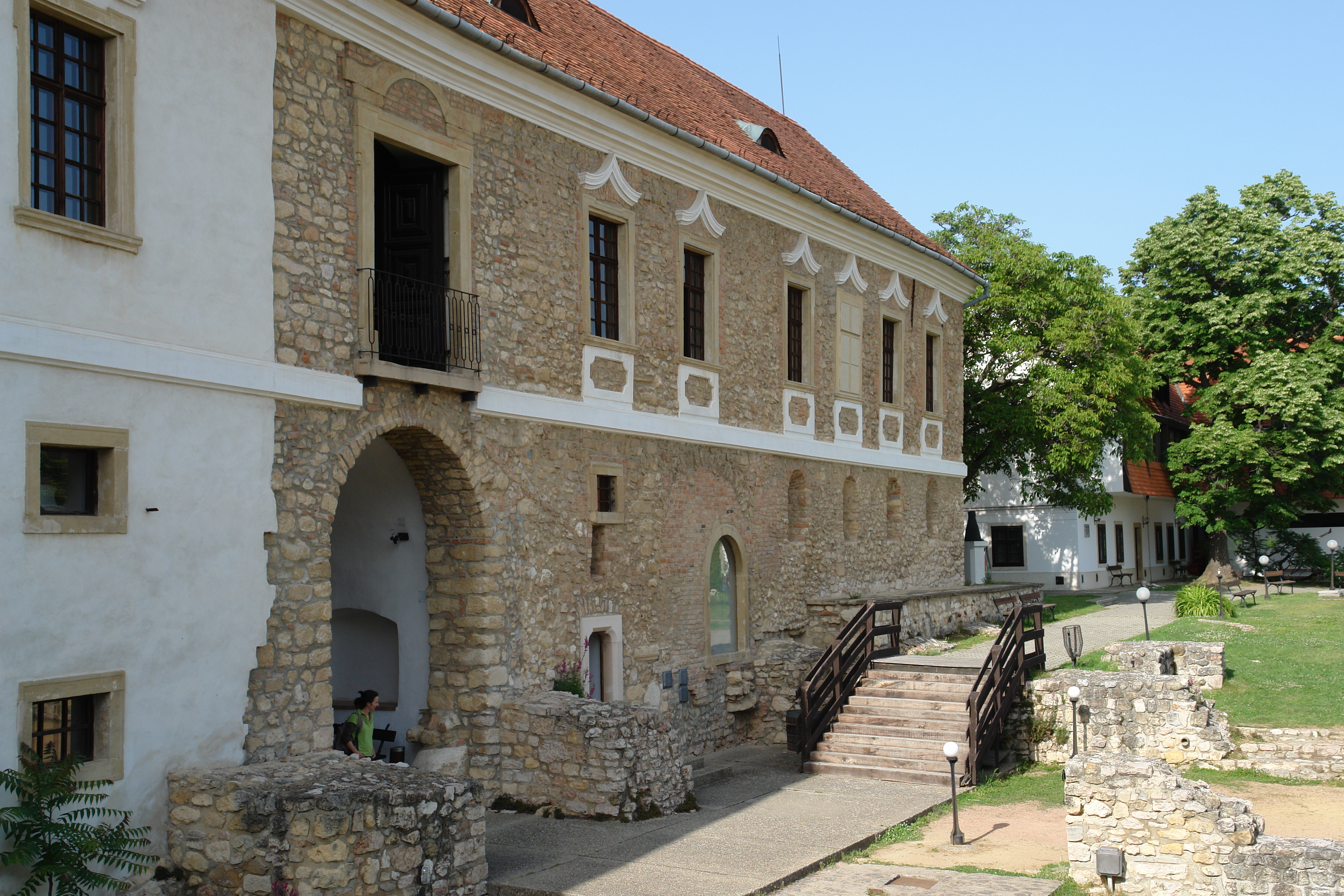
Ruins of the Pécsvárad Abbey, established by Stephen

Bishop Leodvin wrote that Stephen collected relics of a number of saints in "Cesaries" during his campaign in the Balkans, including Saint George and Saint Nicholas. He donated them to his new triple-naved basilica dedicated to the Holy Virgin in Székesfehérvár, where he also set up a cathedral chapter and his new capital. His decision was influenced by the opening, in 1018 or 1019, of a new pilgrimage route that bypassed his old capital, Esztergom. The new route connected Western Europe and the Holy Land through Hungary. Stephen often met the pilgrims, contributing to the spread of his fame throughout Europe. Abbot Odilo of Cluny, for example, wrote in a letter to Stephen that "those who have returned from the shrine of our Lord" testify to the king's passion "towards the honour of our divine religion". Stephen also established four hostels for pilgrims in Constantinople, Jerusalem, Ravenna and Rome.

[Almost] all those from Italy and Gaul who wished to go to the Sepulchre of the Lord at Jerusalem abandoned the usual route, which was by sea, making their way through the country of King Stephen. He made the road safe for everyone, welcomed as brothers all he saw and gave them enormous gifts. This action led many people, nobles and commoners, to go to Jerusalem.

— Rodulfus Glaber, The Five Books of the Histories

In addition to pilgrims, merchants often used the safe route across Hungary when travelling between Constantinople and Western Europe. Stephen's legends refer to 60 wealthy Pechenegs who travelled to Hungary, but were attacked by Hungarian border guards. The king sentenced his soldiers to death in order to demonstrate his determination to preserve internal peace. Regular minting of coinage began in Hungary in the 1020s. His silver dinars bearing the inscriptions STEPHANUS REX ("King Stephen") and REGIA CIVITAS ("royal city") were popular in contemporary Europe, as demonstrated by counterfeited copies unearthed in Sweden.

Stephen convinced some pilgrims and merchants to settle in Hungary. Gerard, a Benedictine monk who arrived in Hungary from the Republic of Venice between 1020 and 1026, initially planned to continue his journey to the Holy Land, but decided to stay in the country after his meeting with the king. Stephen also established a number of Benedictine monasteries—including the abbeys at Pécsvárad, Zalavár and Bakonybél—in this period.

The Long Life of Saint Gerard mentions Stephen's conflict with Ajtony, a chieftain in the region of the river Maros. Many historians date their clash to the end of the 1020s, although Györffy and other scholars put it at least a decade earlier. The conflict arose when Ajtony, who "had taken his power from the Greeks", according to Saint Gerard's legend, levied tax on the salt transported to Stephen on the river. The king sent a large army led by Csanád against Ajtony, who was killed in battle. His lands were transformed into a Hungarian county and the king set up a new bishopric at Csanád (Cenad, Romania), Ajtony's former capital, which was renamed after the commander of the royal army. According to the Annales Posonienses, the Venetian Gerard was consecrated as the first bishop of the new diocese in 1030.

=== Conflicts with the Holy Roman Empire (1024–1031) ===
Stephen's brother-in-law, Emperor Henry, died on 13 July 1024. He was succeeded by a distant relative, Conrad II (r. 1024–1039), who adopted an offensive foreign policy. Conrad II expelled Doge Otto Orseolo—the husband of Stephen's sister—from Venice in 1026. He also persuaded the Bavarians to proclaim his own son, Henry, as their duke in 1027, although Stephen's son Emeric had a strong claim to the Duchy of Bavaria through his mother. Emperor Conrad planned a marriage alliance with the Byzantine Empire and dispatched one of his advisors, Bishop Werner of Strasbourg, to Constantinople. In the autumn of 1027, the bishop seemingly travelled as a pilgrim, but Stephen, who had been informed of his actual purpose, refused to let him enter into his country. Conrad II's biographer Wipo of Burgundy narrated that the Bavarians incited skirmishes along the common borders of Hungary and the Holy Roman Empire in 1029, causing a rapid deterioration in relations between the two countries.

Emperor Conrad personally led his armies to Hungary in June 1030 and plundered the lands west of the River Rába. However, according to the Annals of Niederalteich, the emperor, suffering from consequences of the scorched earth tactics used by the Hungarian army, returned to Germany "without an army and without achieving anything, because the army was threatened by starvation and was captured by the Hungarians at Vienna". Peace was restored after Conrad had ceded the lands between the rivers Lajta and Fischa to Hungary in the summer of 1031.

At this same time, dissensions arose between the Pannonian nation and the Bavarians, through the fault of the Bavarians. And, as a result, King [Stephen] of Hungary made many incursions and raids in the realm of the Norici (that is, of the Bavarians). Disturbed on this account Emperor Conrad came upon the Hungarians with a great army. But King [Stephen], whose forces were entirely insufficient to meet the Emperor, relied solely on the guardianship of the Lord, which he sought with prayers and fasts proclaimed through his whole realm. Since the Emperor was not able to enter a kingdom so fortified with rivers and forests, he returned, after he had sufficiently avenged his injury with lootings and burnings on the borders of the kingdom; and it was his wish at a more opportune time to complete the things he had begun. His son, King Henry, however, still a young boy entrusted to the care of Eigilbert, bishop of Freising, received a legation of King [Stephen] which asked for peace; and solely with the counsel of the princes of the realm, and without his father's knowledge, he granted the favor of reconciliation.

— Wipo, The Deeds of Conrad II

=== Last years (1031–1038) ===
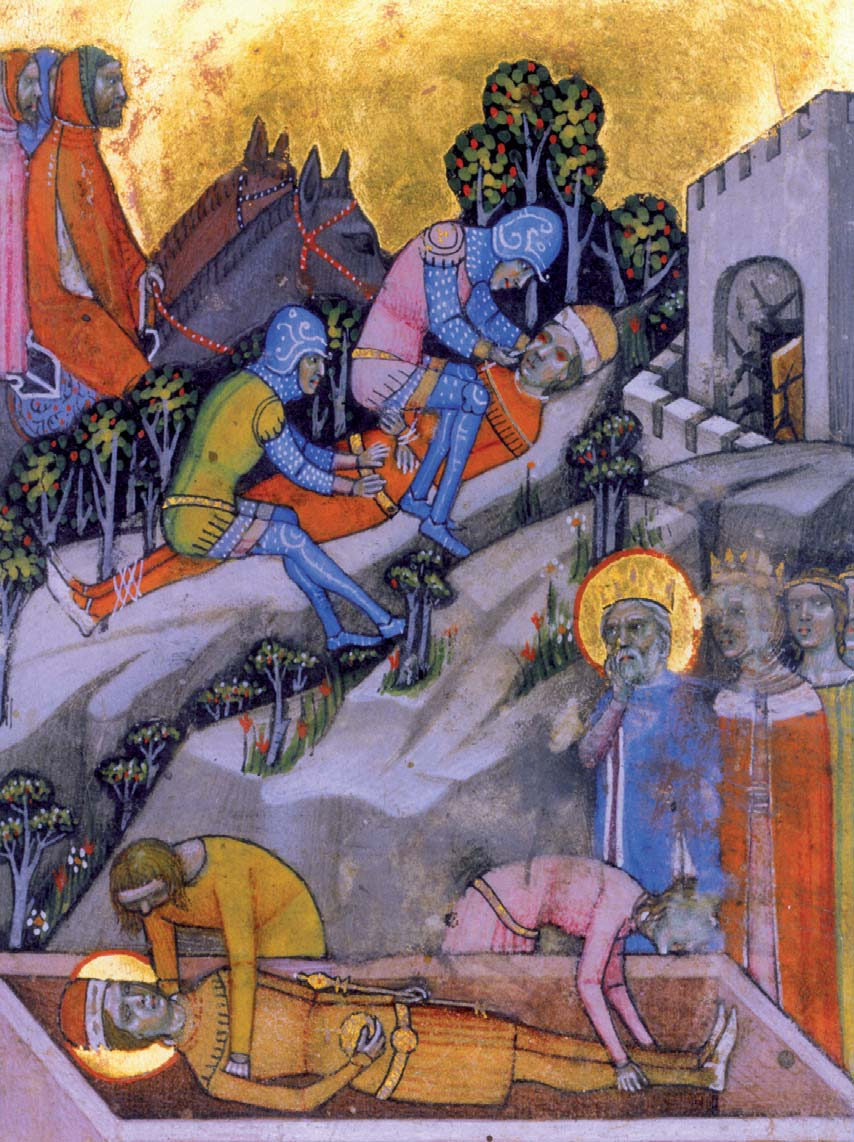
Prince Emeric's funeral and the blinding of Vazul (Chronicon Pictum, 1358)

Stephen's biographer, Hartvic, narrates that the King, whose children died one by one in infancy, "restrained the grief over their death by the solace on account of the love of his surviving son", Emeric. However, Emeric was wounded in a hunting accident and died in 1031. After the death of his son, the elderly King could never "fully regain his former health", according to the Illuminated Chronicle. Kristó writes that the picture, which has been preserved in Stephen's legends, of the king keeping the vigils and washing the feet of paupers, is connected with Stephen's last years, following the death of his son.

Emeric's death jeopardized his father's achievements in establishing a Christian state, because Stephen's cousin, Vazul—who had the strongest claim to succeed him—was suspected of an inclination towards paganism. According to the Annals of Altaich Stephen disregarded his cousin's claim and nominated his sister's son, the Venetian Peter Orseolo, as his heir. The same source adds that Vazul was captured and blinded, and his three sons, Levente, Andrew and Béla, were expelled from Hungary. Stephen's legends refer to an unsuccessful attempt upon the elderly king's life by members of his court. According to Kristó, the legends refer to a plot in which Vazul participated and his mutilation was a punishment for this act. That Vazul's ears were filled with molten lead was only recorded in later sources, including the Illuminated Chronicle.

In the view of some historians, provisions in Stephen's Second Book of Laws on the "conspiracy against the king and the kingdom" imply that the book was promulgated after Vazul's unsuccessful plot against Stephen. However, this view has not been universally accepted. Györffy states that the law book was issued, not after 1031, but around 1009. Likewise, the authenticity of the decree on tithes is debated: according to Györffy, it was issued during Stephen's reign, but Berend, Laszlovszky and Szakács argue that it "might be a later addition".

Stephen died on 15 August 1038. He was buried in the basilica of Székesfehérvár. His reign was followed by a long period of civil wars, pagan uprisings and foreign invasions. The instability ended in 1077 when Ladislaus, a grandson of Vazul, ascended the throne.

== Family ==
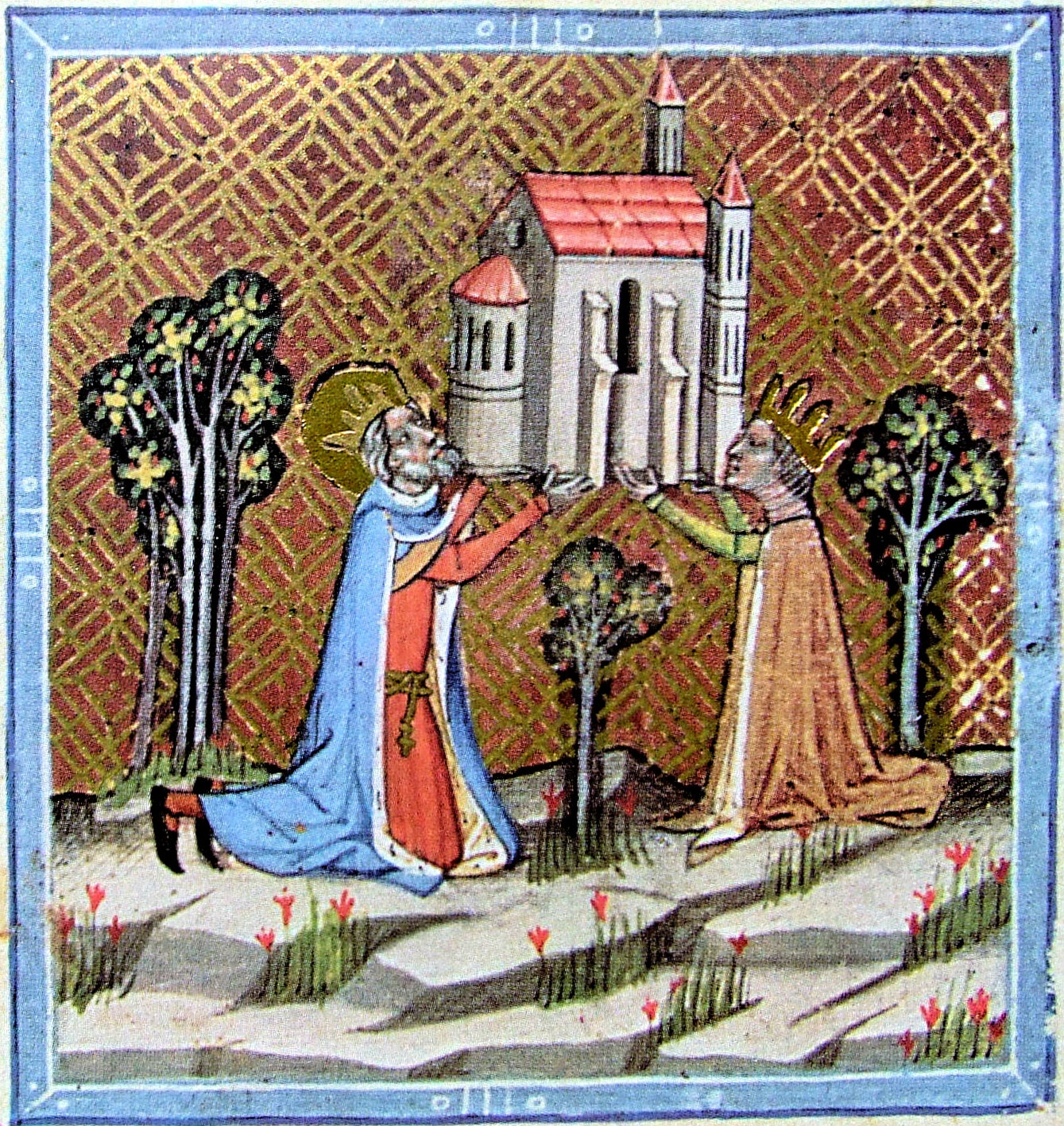
King Stephen and his wife Gisela of Bavaria founding a church at Óbuda from the Chronicon Pictum

Stephen married Gisela, a daughter of Duke Henry the Wrangler of Bavaria, who was a nephew of Otto I, Holy Roman Emperor. Gisela's mother was Gisela of Burgundy, a member of the Welf dynasty. Born around 985, Gisela was younger than her husband, whom she survived. She left Hungary in 1045 and died as Abbess of the Niedernburg Abbey in Passau in Bavaria around 1060.

Although the Illuminated Chronicle states that Stephen "begot many sons", only two of them, Otto and Emeric, are known by name. Otto, who was named after Otto III, seems to have been born before 1002. He died as a child.

Emeric, who received the name of his maternal uncle, Emperor Henry II, was born around 1007. His Legend from the early 12th century describes him as a saintly prince who preserved his chastity even during his marriage. According to Györffy, Emeric's wife was a kinswoman of the Byzantine Emperor Basil II. His premature death led to the series of conflicts leading to Vazul's blinding and civil wars.

Be obedient to me, my son. You are a child, descendant of rich parents, living among soft pillows, who has been caressed and brought up in all kinds of comforts; you have had a part neither in the troubles of the campaigns nor in the various attacks of the pagans in which almost my whole life has been worn away.

— Stephen's Admonitions to his son, Emeric

The following family tree presents Stephen's ancestors and his relatives who are mentioned in the article.

Gyula the Elder	Grand Prince Taksony	a "Cuman" lady*
Henry of Bavaria	Gisela of Burgundy	Gyula the Younger	Sarolt	Grand Prince Géza
two daughters	daughter	Doge Otto Orseolo	daughter	Samuel Aba***
Gisela of Bavaria	Stephen I	a Bulgarian princess**	Michael of Hungary
Peter, King of Hungary
Vazul
Otto	Emeric	Byzantine princess

*A Khazar, Pecheneg or Volga Bulgarian lady.
**Györffy writes that she may have been a member of the Bulgarian Cometopuli dynasty.
***Samuel Aba might have been the son of Stephen's sister instead of her husband.

== Legacy ==
=== Founder of Christian Kingdom of Hungary ===
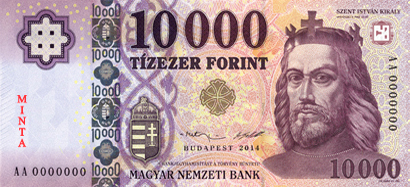
King Saint Stephen on the 10,000 forint Hungarian banknote

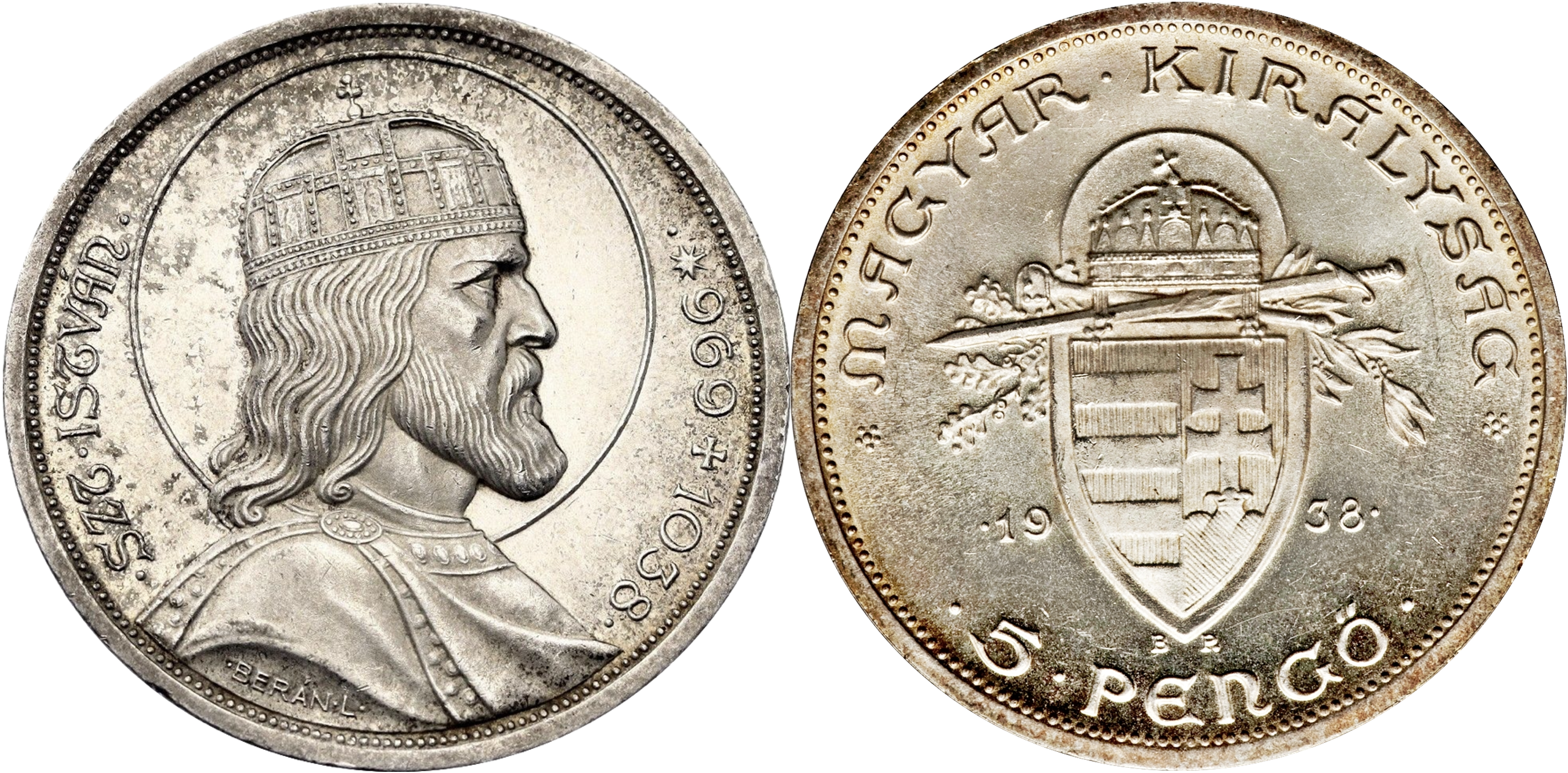
Hungarian silver 5 pengő (1938), minted to commemorate the 1000th anniversary of the death of King Saint Stephen

Stephen has always been considered one of the most important statesmen in the history of Hungary. His main achievement was the establishment of a Christian state that ensured that the Hungarians survived in the Carpathian Basin, in contrast to the Huns, Avars and other peoples who had previously controlled the same territory. As Bryan Cartledge emphasizes, Stephen also gave his kingdom "forty years of relative peace and sound but unspectacular rule".

His successors, including those descended from Vazul, were eager to emphasize their devotion to Stephen's achievements. Although Vazul's son, Andrew I of Hungary, secured the throne due to a pagan uprising, he prohibited pagan rites and declared that his subjects should "live in all things according to the law which King St. Stephen had taught them", according to the 14th-century Illuminated Chronicle. In medieval Hungary, communities that claimed a privileged status or attempted to preserve their own "liberties" often declared that the origin of their special status was to be attributed to King Saint Stephen. An example is a 1347 letter from the people of Táp telling the king about their grievances against the Pannonhalma Archabbey and stating that the taxes levied upon them by the abbot contradicted "the liberty granted to them in the time of King Saint Stephen".

=== Sainthood and veneration ===
King Saint Stephen
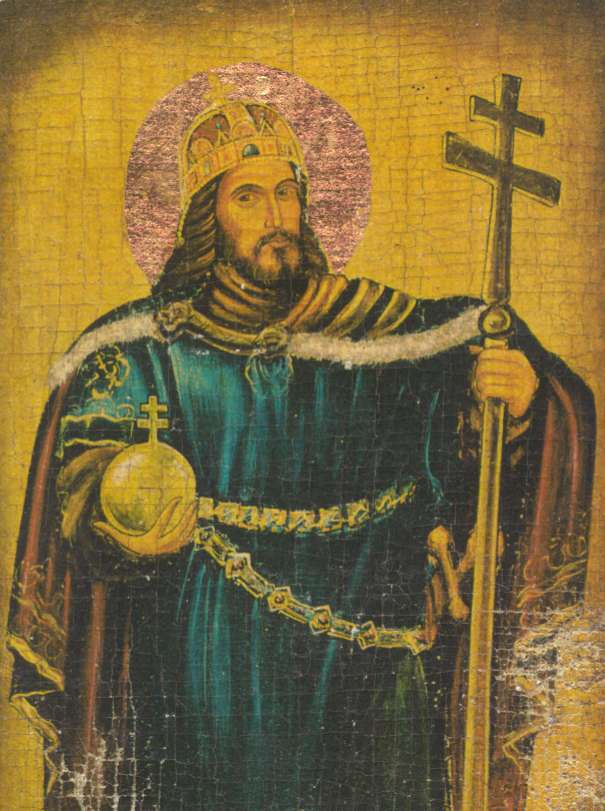

King and Confessor
- Venerated in: Catholic Church; Eastern Orthodox Church; Anglican Communion
- Canonized: 20 August 1083, Székesfehérvár by Pope Gregory VII
- Major shrine: St. Stephen's Basilica; Budapest, Hungary
- Feast: 16 August; 20 August (in Hungary); 2 September (1686–1969); 30 May (his Holy Dexter in Hungary)
- Attributes: Crown; Sceptre; globe
- Patronage: Hungary, kings, masons, stonecutters, stonemason, bricklayers, protector against child death

Stephen's cult emerged after the long period of anarchy characterizing the rule of his immediate successors. However, there is no evidence that Stephen became an object of veneration before his canonization. For instance, the first member of the royal family to be named after him, Stephen II, was born in the early 12th century.

Stephen's canonization was initiated by Vazul's grandson, King Ladislaus I of Hungary, who had consolidated his authority by capturing and imprisoning his cousin, Solomon. According to Bishop Hartvic, the canonization was "decreed by apostolic letter, by order of the Roman see", suggesting that the ceremony was permitted by Pope Gregory VII. The ceremony started at Stephen's tomb, where on 15 August 1083 masses of believers began three days of fasting and praying. Legend tells that Stephen's coffin could not be opened until King Ladislaus held Solomon in captivity at Visegrád. The opening of Stephen's tomb was followed by the occurrence of healing miracles, according to Stephen's legends. Historian Kristó attributes the healings either to mass psychosis or deception. Stephen's legends also say that his "balsam-scented" remains were elevated from the coffin, which was filled with "rose-colored water", on 20 August. On the same day, Stephen's son, Emeric, and the bishop of Csanád, Gerard, were also canonized.

Having completed the office of Vespers the third day, everyone expected the favors of divine mercy through the merit of the blessed man; suddenly with Christ visiting his masses, the signs of miracles poured forth from heaven throughout the whole of the holy house. Their multitude, which that night were too many to count, brings to mind the answer from the Gospel which the Savior of the world confided to John, who asked through messengers whether he was the one who was to come: the blind see, the lame walk, the deaf hear, the lepers are cleansed, the crippled are set straight, the paralyzed are cured...

— Hartvic, Life of King Stephen of Hungary

Stephen's first legend, the so-called Greater Legend, was written between 1077 and 1083. It provided an idealized portrait of the king, one who dedicated himself and his kingdom to the Virgin Mary. However, Stephen's Lesser Legend—composed around 1100, under King Coloman—emphasized Stephen's severity. A third legend, also composed during King Coloman's reign by Bishop Hartvic, was based on the two existing legends. Sanctioned in 1201 by Pope Innocent III, Hartvic's work served as Stephen's official legend. Gábor Klaniczay wrote that Stephen's legends "opened a new chapter in the legends of holy rulers as a genre", suggesting that a monarch can achieve sainthood through actively using his royal powers. Stephen was the first triumphant miles Christi ("Christ's soldier") among the canonized monarchs. He was also a "confessor king", one who had not suffered martyrdom, whose cult was sanctioned, in contrast with earlier holy monarchs.

Stephen's cult spread beyond the borders of Hungary. Initially, he was primarily venerated in Scheyern and Bamberg, in Bavaria, but his relics were also taken to Aachen, Cologne, Montecassino and Namur. Upon the liberation of Buda from the Ottoman Turks, Pope Innocent XI expanded King Saint Stephen's cult to the entire Catholic Church in 1686, and declared 2 September his feast day. As the feast of Saint Joachim was moved, in 1969, from 16 August, the day immediately following the day of Stephen's death, Stephen's feast was moved to that date. Stephen is venerated as the patron saint of Hungary, and regarded as the protector of kings, masons, stonecutters, stonemasons and bricklayers, and also of children suffering from severe illnesses. His canonization was recognized by Ecumenical Patriarch Bartholomew I of Constantinople in 2000. In the calendar of the Hungarian Catholic Church, Stephen's feast is observed on 20 August, the day on which his relics were translated. In addition, a separate feast day (30 May) is dedicated to his "Holy Dexter".

=== Holy Dexter ===
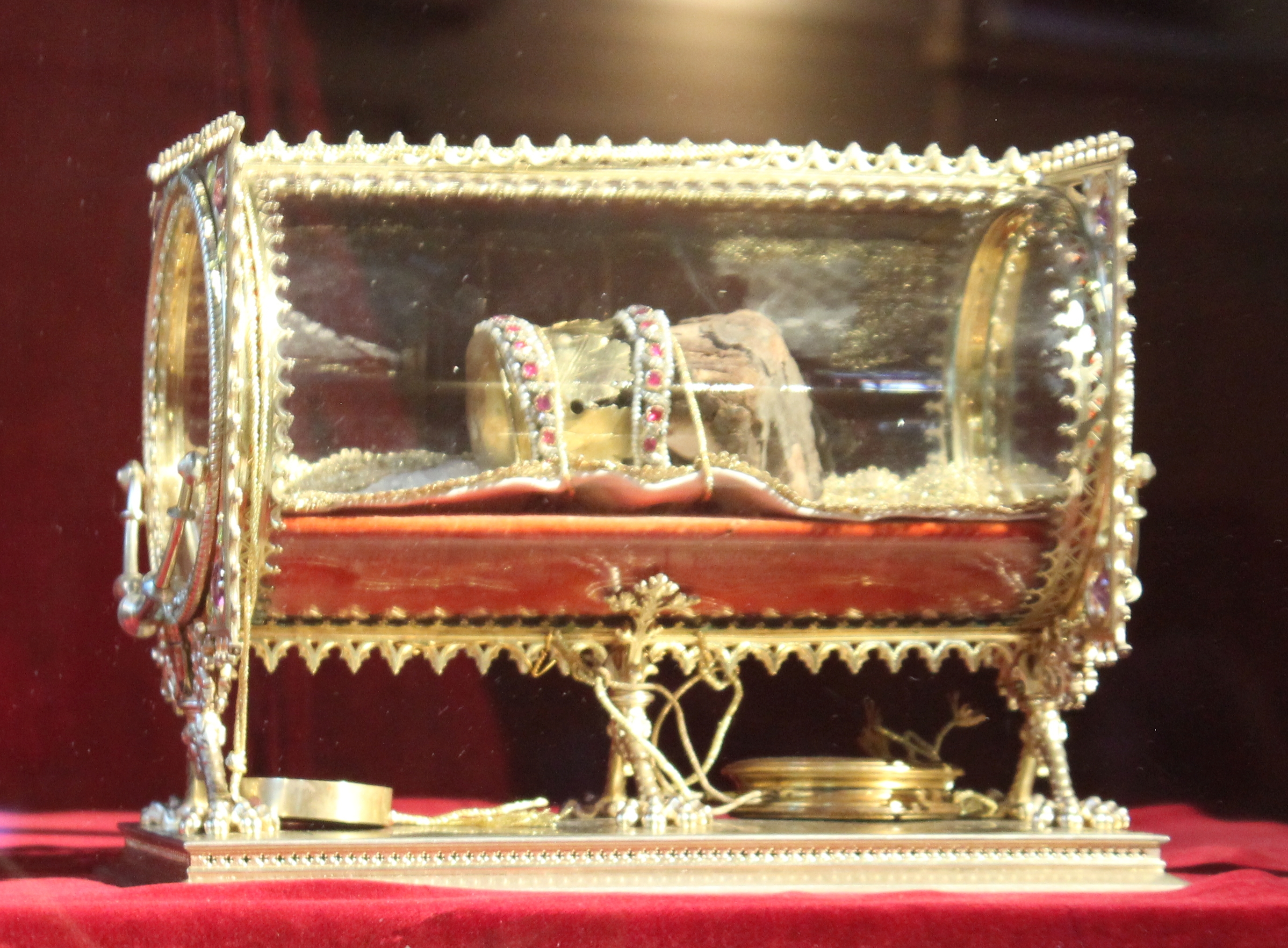
The Holy Right displayed in St. Stephen's Basilica, Budapest

Stephen's intact dexter, or right hand (Hungarian: Szent Jobb), became the subject of a cult. A cleric named Mercurius stole it, but it was discovered on 30 May 1084 in Bihar County. The theft of sacred relics, or furta sacra, had by that time become a popular topic of saints' biographies. Bishop Hartvic described the discovery of Stephen's right hand in accordance with this tradition, referring to adventures and visions. An abbey erected in Bihar County (now Sâniob, Romania) was named after and dedicated to the veneration of the Holy Dexter.

Why is it, brothers, that his other limbs having become disjointed and, his flesh having been reduced to dust, wholly separated, only the right hand, its skin and sinews adhering to the bones, preserved the beauty of wholeness? I surmise that the inscrutability of divine judgement sought to proclaim by the extraordinary nature of this fact nothing less than that the work of love and alms surpasses the measure of all other virtues. ... The right hand of the blessed man was deservedly exempt from putrefaction, because always reflourishing from the flower of kindness it was never empty from giving gifts to nourish the poor.

— Hartvic, Life of King Stephen of Hungary

The Holy Dexter was kept for centuries in the Szentjobb Abbey, except during the Mongol invasion of 1241 and 1242, when it was transferred to Ragusa (now Dubrovnik, Croatia). The relic was then taken to Székesfehérvár around 1420. Following the Ottoman occupation of the central territories of the Kingdom of Hungary in the mid-16th century, it was guarded in many places, including Bosnia, Ragusa and Vienna. It was returned to Hungary in 1771, when Queen Maria Theresa donated it to the cloister of the Sisters of Loreto in Buda. It was kept in Buda Castle's St. Sigismund Chapel between around 1900 and 1944, in a cave near Salzburg in 1944 and 1945, and again by the Sisters of Loreto in Buda, between 1945 and 1950. Finally, since 1950, the Holy Dexter has been in St. Stephen's Basilica in Budapest. An annual procession celebrating the relic was instituted in 1938, and continued until 1950, when the procession was forbidden by the Communist government. It was resumed in 1988.

=== Admonitions ===
According to Stephen's Greater Legend, the king "himself compiled a book for his son on moral education". This work, now known as Admonitions or De institutione morum, was preserved in manuscripts written in the Late Middle Ages. Although scholars debate whether it can actually be attributed to the king or a cleric, most of them agree that it was composed in the first decades of the 11th century.

The Admonitions argues that kingship is inseparably connected with the Catholic faith. Its author emphasized that a monarch is required to make donations to the Church and regularly consult his prelates, but is entitled to punish clergymen who do wrong. One of its basic ideas was that a sovereign has to cooperate with the "pillars of his rule", meaning the prelates, aristocrats, ispáns and warriors.

My dearest son, if you desire to honor the royal crown, I advise, I counsel, I urge you above all things to maintain the Catholic and Apostolic faith with such diligence and care that you may be an example for all those placed under you by God, and that all the clergy may rightly call you a man of true Christian profession. Failing to do this, you may be sure that you will not be called a Christian or a son of the Church. Indeed, in the royal palace, after the faith itself, the Church holds second place, first constituted and spread through the whole world by His members, the apostles and holy fathers, And though she always produced fresh offspring, nevertheless in certain places she is regarded as ancient. However, dearest son, even now in our kingdom the Church is proclaimed as young and newly planted; and for that reason she needs more prudent and trustworthy guardians lest a benefit which the divine mercy bestowed on us undeservedly should be destroyed and annihilated through your idleness, indolence or neglect.

— Stephen's Admonitions to his son, Emeric

=== In arts ===
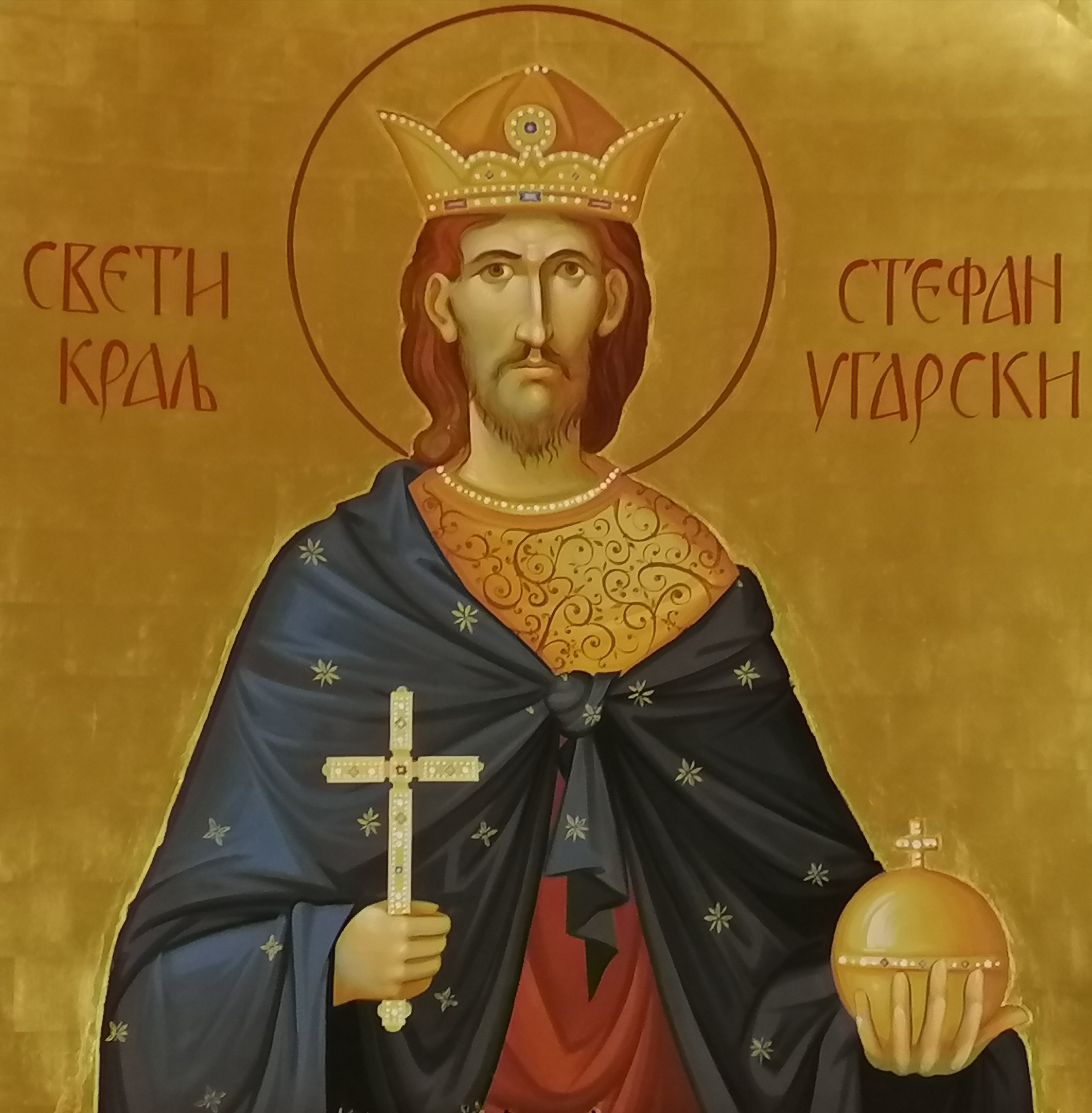
Art in Serbian Orthodox Church of Saint Sava in Belgrade, Serbia

King St Stephen has been a popular theme in Hungarian poetry since the end of the 13th century. The earliest poems were religious hymns which portrayed the holy king as the apostle of the Hungarians. Secular poetry, especially poems written for his feast day, followed a similar pattern, emphasizing Stephen's role as the first king of Hungary. Poets described Stephen as the symbol of national identity and independence and of the ability of the Hungarian nation to survive historical cataclysms during the Communist regime between 1949 and 1989.

A popular hymn, still sung in the churches, was first recorded in the late 18th century. It hails King St. Stephen as "radiant star of Hungarians". Ludwig van Beethoven composed his King Stephen Overture for the inauguration of the Hungarian theatre in Pest in 1812. According to musician James M. Keller, "[t]he descending unisons that open the King Stephen Overture would seem to prefigure the opening of the Ninth Symphony; ... [a]nd then a later theme, introduced by flutes and clarinets, seems almost to be a variation ... of the famous Ode 'To Joy' melody of the Ninth Symphony's finale". Hungarian composer Ferenc Erkel named his last complete opera from 1885, István király ("King Stephen"), after him. In 1938, Zoltán Kodály wrote a choral piece titled Ének Szent István Királyhoz ("Hymn to King Stephen"). In 1983, Levente Szörényi and János Bródy composed a rock opera—István, a király ("Stephen, the King")—about the early years of his reign. Seventeen years later, in 2000, Szörényi composed a sequel called Veled, Uram! ("You, Sir").

== See also ==
- Catholic Church in Hungary
- History of Christianity in Hungary
- Isten, hazánkért térdelünk
- SMS Szent István
- St. Stephen's Mausoleum

== Sources ==
=== Primary sources ===
- "Hartvic, Life of King Stephen of Hungary" (Translated by Nora Berend) (2001). In Head, Thomas. Medieval Hagiography: An Anthology. Routledge. pp. 378–398. ISBN 0-415-93753-1.
- John Skylitzes: A Synopsis of Byzantine History, 811–1057 (Translated by John Wortley with Introduction by Jean-Claude Cheynet and Bernard Flusin and Notes by Jean-Claude Cheynet) (2010). Cambridge University Press. ISBN 978-0-521-76705-7.
- "Life of the Five Brethren by Bruno of Querfurt (Translated by Marina Miladinov)" (2013). In Saints of the Christianization Age of Central Europe (Tenth-Eleventh Centuries) (Edited by Gábor Klaniczay, translated by Cristian Gaşpar and Marina Miladinov, with an introductory essay by Ian Wood) [Central European Medieval Texts, Volume 6.]. Central European University Press. pp. 183–314. ISBN 978-615-5225-20-8.
- Ottonian Germany: The Chronicon of Thietmar of Merseburg (Translated and annotated by David A. Warner) (2001). Manchester University Press. ISBN 0-7190-4926-1.
- "Rodulfus Glaber: The Five Books of the Histories" (2002). In Rodulfus Glaber Opera (Edited by John France, Neithard Bulst and Paul Reynolds) [Oxford Medieval Texts]. Oxford University Press. ISBN 0-19-822241-6.
- Simon of Kéza: The Deeds of the Hungarians (Edited and translated by László Veszprémy and Frank Schaer with a study by Jenő Szűcs) (1999). Central European University Press. ISBN 963-9116-31-9.
- "Pope Gregory VII's letter to King Solomon of Hungary, claiming suzerainty over that kingdom". In The Correspondence of Pope Gregory: Selected Letters from the Registrum (Translated with and Introduction and Notes by Ephraim Emerton). Columbia University Press. pp. 48–49. ISBN 978-0-231-09627-0.
- "The Deeds of Conrad II (Wipo)" (2000). In Imperial Lives & Letters of the Eleventh Century (Translated by Theodor E. Mommsen and Karl F. Morrison, with a historical introduction and new suggested readings by Karl F. Morrison, edited by Robert L. Benson). Columbia University Press. pp. 52–100. ISBN 978-0-231-12121-7.
- The Deeds of the Princes of the Poles (Translated and annotated by Paul W. Knoll and Frank Schaer with a preface by Thomas N. Bisson) (2003). Central European University Press. ISBN 963-9241-40-7.
- The Hungarian Illuminated Chronicle: Chronica de Gestis Hungarorum (Edited by Dezső Dercsényi) (1970). Corvina, Taplinger Publishing. ISBN 0-8008-4015-1.
- "The Laws of King Stephen I (1000–1038)". In The Laws of the Medieval Kingdom of Hungary, 1000–1301 (Translated and edited by János M. Bak, György Bónis, James Ross Sweeney with an essay on previous editions by Andor Czizmadia, Second revised edition, In collaboration with Leslie S. Domonkos) (1999). Charles Schlacks Jr. Publishers. pp. 1–11. ISBN 1-884445-29-2. OCLC 495379882. OCLC 248424393. LCCN 89-10492. OL 12153527M. (ISBN may be misprinted in the book as 88445–29–2).

=== Secondary sources ===
- Bakay, Kornél (1999). "Hungary". In Reuter, Timothy (ed.). The New Cambridge Medieval History, Volume III: c. 900–c.1024. Cambridge University Press. pp. 536–552. ISBN 978-0-521-36447-8.
- Berend, Nora (2001). "Introduction to Hartvic, Life of King Stephen of Hungary". In Head, Thomas (ed.). Medieval Hagiography: An Anthology. Routledge. pp. 375–377. ISBN 978-0-415-93753-5.
- Berend, Nora; Laszlovszky, József; Szakács, Béla Zsolt (2007). "The kingdom of Hungary". In Berend, Nora (ed.). Christianization and the Rise of Christian Monarchy: Scandinavia, Central Europe and Rus', c. 900–1200. Cambridge University Press. pp. 319–368. ISBN 978-0-521-87616-2.
- Butler, Alban; Cumming, John; Burns, Paul (1998). Butler's Lives of the Saints (New Full Edition): August. Burns & Oates. ISBN 978-0-86012-257-9.
- Cartledge, Bryan (2011). The Will to Survive: A History of Hungary. C. Hurst & Co. ISBN 978-1-84904-112-6.
- Curta, Florin (2001). "Transylvania around AD 1000". In Urbańczyk, Przemysław (ed.). Europe around the year 1000. Wydawnictwo DIG. pp. 141–165. ISBN 978-83-7181-211-8.
- Csorba, Csaba (2004). Szentjobb vára [Castle of Szentjobb] (in Hungarian). A Hajdú-Bihar Megyei Önkormányzat Hajdú-Bihar Megyei Múzeumok Igazgatósága. ISBN 978-963-7194-15-3.
- Engel, Pál (2001). The Realm of St Stephen: A History of Medieval Hungary, 895–1526. I.B. Tauris Publishers. ISBN 978-1-86064-061-2.
- Guiley, Rosemary Ellen (2001). The Encyclopedia of Saints. Infobase Publishing. ISBN 978-1-4381-3026-2.
- Györffy, György (1983). István király és műve [King Stephen and his work] (in Hungarian). Gondolat Könyvkiadó. ISBN 978-963-9441-87-3.
- Györffy, György (1994). King Saint Stephen of Hungary. Atlantic Research and Publications. ISBN 978-0-88033-300-9.
- Klaniczay, Gábor (2002). Holy Rulers and Blessed Princes: Dynastic Cults in Medieval Central Europe. Cambridge University Press. ISBN 978-0-521-42018-1.
- Kontler, László (1999). Millennium in Central Europe: A History of Hungary. Atlantisz Publishing House. ISBN 978-963-9165-37-3.
- Kristó, Gyula; Makk, Ferenc (1996). Az Árpád-ház uralkodói [Rulers of the House of Árpád] (in Hungarian). I.P.C. Könyvek. ISBN 978-963-7930-97-3.
- Kristó, Gyula (2001). "The Life of King Stephen the Saint". In Zsoldos, Attila (ed.). Saint Stephen and His Country: A Newborn Kingdom in Central Europe – Hungary. Lucidus Kiadó. pp. 15–36. ISBN 978-963-86163-9-5.
- Kristó, Gyula (2003). Háborúk és hadviselés az Árpádok korában [Wars and Tactics under the Árpáds] (in Hungarian). Szukits Könyvkiadó. ISBN 978-963-9441-87-3.
- Lenkey, Zoltán (2003). "Szent István [Saint Stephen]". In Szentpéteri, József (ed.). Szent István és III. András [Saint Stephen and Andrew III] (in Hungarian). Kossuth Kiadó. pp. 5–118. ISBN 978-963-09-4461-8.
- Lukačka, Ján (2011). "The beginnings of the nobility in Slovakia". In Teich, Mikuláš; Kováč, Dušan; Brown, Martin D. (eds.). Slovakia in History. Cambridge University Press. pp. 30–37. ISBN 978-0-521-80253-6.
- Magyar, Zoltán (1996). Szent István a magyar kultúrtörténetben [Saint Stephen in the History of Hungarian Arts] (in Hungarian). Helikon Kiadó. ISBN 978-963-208-401-5.
- Makk, Ferenc (2001). "On the Foreign Policy of Saint Stephen". In Zsoldos, Attila (ed.). Saint Stephen and His Country: A Newborn Kingdom in Central Europe – Hungary. Lucidus Kiadó. pp. 37–48. ISBN 978-963-86163-9-5.
- Makk, Ferenc (1993). Magyar külpolitika (896–1196) [Hungarian Foreign Policy (896–1196)] (in Hungarian). Szegedi Középkorász Műhely. ISBN 978-963-04-2913-9.
- Molnár, Miklós (2001). A Concise History of Hungary. Cambridge University Press. ISBN 978-0-521-66736-4.
- O'Malley, Vincent J., CM (1995). Saintly Companions: A Cross-Reference of Sainted Relationships. Alba House. ISBN 978-0-8189-0693-0.
- Sălăgean, Tudor (2005). "Romanian Society in the Early Middle Ages (9th–14th Centuries AD)". In Pop, Ioan-Aurel; Bolovan, Ioan (eds.). History of Romania: Compendium. Romanian Cultural Institute (Center for Transylvanian Studies). pp. 133–207. ISBN 978-973-7784-12-4.
- Steinhübel, Ján (2011). "The Duchy of Nitra". In Teich, Mikuláš; Kováč, Dušan; Brown, Martin D. (eds.). Slovakia in History. Cambridge University Press. pp. 15–29. ISBN 978-0-521-80253-6.
- Thoroczkay, Gábor (2001). "The Dioceses and Bishops of Saint Stephen". In Zsoldos, Attila (ed.). Saint Stephen and His Country: A Newborn Kingdom in Central Europe – Hungary. Lucidus Kiadó. pp. 49–68. ISBN 978-963-86163-9-5.
- Tringli, István (2001). "The Liberty of the Holy King: Saint Stephen and the Holy Kings in the Hungarian Legal Heritaga". In Zsoldos, Attila (ed.). Saint Stephen and His Country: A Newborn Kingdom in Central Europe – Hungary. Lucidus Kiadó. pp. 127–179. ISBN 978-963-86163-9-5.
- Veszprémy, László (1994). "Gizella". In Kristó, Gyula; Engel, Pál; Makk, Ferenc (eds.). Korai magyar történeti lexikon (9–14. század) [Encyclopedia of the Early Hungarian History (9th–14th centuries)] (in Hungarian). Akadémiai Kiadó. pp. 236–237. ISBN 978-963-05-6722-0.
- Wolfram, Herwig (2006). Conrad II, 990–1039: Emperor of Three Kingdoms. The Pennsylvania State University Press. ISBN 978-0-271-02738-8.

Stephen I of Hungary Árpád dynasty Born: c. 975 Died: 15 August 1038
Regnal titles
Preceded by Géza	Grand Prince of the Hungarians; 997–1000	Vacant Became king
New title	King of Hungary; 1000–1038	Succeeded by Peter
