= Radla =

Radla (or Radula, died after 1000) was a Czech priest and tutor of Saint Adalbert of Prague (Czech: Svatý Vojtěch).

Only little is known about life of Radla and the available information is often contradictory. He could be the bastard son of Slavník, the founder of Slavník's dynasty and father of Adalbert.

Radla was tutor and close friend of Adalbert (they both studied in Magdeburg) and accompanied him on his pilgrimage to Rome. After Slavník's were slaughtered (995) Radla left for Hungary where he stayed in the service of the wife of Duke Geza. Adalbert asked Radla to be his company on travel to Polish lands but Radla opted to stay in Hungary. Bruno of Querfurt, the creator of legend about St. Adalbert, met him there.

Radla is sometimes identified with Anastasius, the first abbot of Břevnov Monastery (from 993) or with Astrik (Anastasius), bishop of the Hungarians in Esztergom. Modern historians, however, are rather skeptical of these claims.

Slovak village Radoľa could have been named after Radla (it lies in the Kysuce area once owned by the Slavník's).
