= Astrik =

11th century saint

St. Astrik
- Archbishop of Esztergom
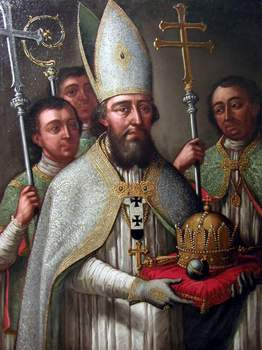
- Archdiocese: Archdiocese of Esztergom
- Appointed: 1007
- Term ended: 1036
- Predecessor: Sebastian
- Successor: Domonkos II

Personal details
- Died: c. 1030/1040
- Denomination: pre-Schism Catholicism

Sainthood
- Feast day: 12 Nov.

Saint Astrik of Pannonhalma (also known as Anastasius, Astericus, Ascrick, Astrissicus) (died c. 1030/1040) is a saint of the 11th century.

== Life ==
Radla was a Czech or Croat from Bohemia, who was a monk in Hungary. He probably received the habit at Brevnov, taking the name of Anastasius, of which Astrik is the equivalent. Astrik accompanied Saint Adalbert in the latter's missionary work to the Bohemians and became the first abbot of Břevnov Monastery. When Adalbert failed to consolidate his position in Bohemia, and left Prague, Astrik Radla went to the Kingdom of Hungary to help the missionaries among the Magyars.

He first served the wife of Duke Géza, Grand Prince of the Hungarians. In 997 Astrik became the first abbot of the Benedictine abbey of St. Martin's (Pannonhalma Archabbey), the first ecclesiastical institution in Hungary, founded by Géza. He then served Géza's son, Stephen I of Hungary, and became the first archbishop of the Hungarian Church.

Astrik served as Stephen's ambassador to Pope Sylvester II. The pope recognized Stephen as King of the Hungarians. Soon after Astrik's return Stephen was crowned by Astrik, with a royal crown sent by Pope Sylvester, granted no doubt at the instance of the Emperor Otto III, in 1001.

== Discovery of remains ==
The Assumption Cathedral of Kalocsa was extensively restored between 1907 and 1912, under the direction of architect Ernő Foerk. Under the sanctuary, a red marble archiepiscopal tomb was excavated in 1910 in the place of the original 11th-century cathedral. In addition to the intact skeleton, a gilded silver-headed crosier, a silver chalice, paten, golden rings, crosses, pallium with three jeweled gold pins, and textile remnants were found. Foerk estimated the age of the grave and thought its 11th-century origin, identified the corpse with Astrik, as the grave laid in the central axis of the first cathedral, a usual resting place for the church founders. Foerk also analogized the crosier with the near-contemporary pastoral staff of Anno II, Archbishop of Cologne (d. 1075). However Jesuit art historian Joseph Braun analyzed the chalice and the textiles based on the pictures sent, but he did not deal with the other objects. Thereafter he dated the grave to the turn of the 12th and 13th centuries. Accordingly, he identified the skeleton as the corpse of 12–13th-century archbishops Saul Győr or Ugrin Csák. The diocese's librarian Pál Winkler emphasized that Ugrin was killed in the Battle of Mohi (1241) and his body was never found. Moritz Dreger considered the textiles of Byzantine origin. In 1912, the tombstone was relocated into the new Archbishop's Crypt with the epitaph "OSSA ANONYMI AEPPI COLOCEN. SAEC. XII. / SAULI DE GYŐR /? / 1192–1202 /".

In January–February 2014, the tomb was re-examined during archeological excavations, which aimed to define the exact age of the skeleton. The identification was supported by the AMS radiocarbon examination that was conducted on the two phalanxes acquired from the skeleton. The result of the Carbon-14 (radiocarbon) examination defined the date of death of the archbishop buried in the grave at (cal AD) 1001–1030, which date coincides with the scanty historical data on Astrik. Accordingly, the skeleton was identified with the corpse of Astrik, and not Saul Győr.

== Sources ==
- Buzás, Gergely (2014). "A kalocsai érseksír azonosítása [Identification of the Archbishop's Tomb in Kalocsa]". Archaeologia – Altum Castrum Online. MNM Visegrádi Mátyás Király Múzeum: 2–7.
- Udvardy, József (1991). A kalocsai érsekek életrajza (1000–1526) [Biographies of Archbishops of Kalocsa, 1000–1526] (in Hungarian). Görres Gesellschaft.
- Zsoldos, Attila (2011). Magyarország világi archontológiája, 1000–1301 [Secular Archontology of Hungary, 1000–1301] (in Hungarian). História, MTA Történettudományi Intézete. ISBN 978-963-9627-38-3.

Astrik Died: c. 1030/1040
Religious titles
Preceded by first	Bishop of Kalocsa c. 1002–c. 1005	Succeeded by himself
Preceded by first	Archbishop of Kalocsa c. 1005–1007	Succeeded by Benedict I
Preceded by Sebastian	Archbishop of Esztergom; 1007–1036	Succeeded by Domonkos II
