= Lád (genus) =

Hungarian clan name

Genus (gens) Lád /Vérbulcsú/
- Country: Principality of Hungary; Kingdom of Hungary
- Founded: late 9th century
- Founder: Kál
- Cadet branches: House of Ládi

Lád (Laad) or Vérbulcsú (Werbulchu) were the name of a gens (Latin for "clan"; nemzetség in Hungarian) in the Kingdom of Hungary, which possessed lands in Transdanubia around Lake Balaton. They were among those clans, who participated in the Hungarian conquest of the Carpathian Basin in the late 9th century. The ancestors of the kindred were harkas Kál and his son Bulcsú.

== Age of principality ==
=== Origin ===
The Lád clan directly originated from that tribe which settled down in Transdanubia around Lake Balaton and on the west side of the mountain Badacsony in the late 9th century, during the Hungarian conquest. The earliest known member is chieftain Kál, who was the father of the skilled military leader Bulcsú. Although 13th-century chroniclers wrongfully attributed Bulcsú's activity to the time of the Hungarian conquest, it was presumably Kál or his father who conquered the aforementioned region.

Mátyás Gyóni assumed that Kál and Bulcsú were of Khalyzian or Khavar ethnicity. These groups rebelled against the Khazar Khaganate and joined the Hungarians in the early 9th century, forming three tribes at the time of the conquest.

=== Tribal territory ===
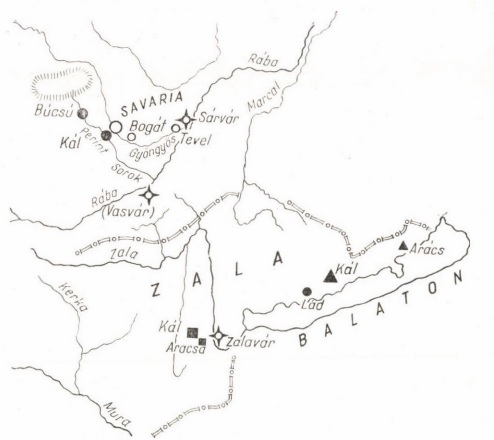
The tribal territory of Kál then Bulcsú, according to György Györffy

According to György Györffy, Kál's summer residence was the Kál Basin, where present-day Köveskál and Mindszentkálla in Veszprém County preserved his name. A vineyard called Harka is also known in Balatonhenye, also located in the Kál Basin. Continuing west, Kál established his winter residence in present-day Dióskál (at Little Balaton), which laid near the Carolingian fort Mosaburg (Zalavár). Thereafter, Mosaburg became the seat of Kál then Bulcsú's territory. Kál's tribe advanced north along the river Zala, reaching the Rába valley along Lake Neusiedl (Fertő) and the area of Szombathely. There the village Bucsu in Vas County preserved Bulcsú's name, as Györffy considered.

There are several villages in Transylvania and Tiszántúl – for instance, Kál in Heves County – which plausibly bear the name Kál or Bulcsú (and also Bogát). According to Györffy, these are the linguistic memories of the temporary residence areas where Bulcsú's tribe initially seized during the first stage of the Hungarian conquest. According to other arguments, these could also be later name adoptions, since the name Bulcsú was relatively common in the 11–14th centuries.

The ancient and large Kolon County (antecedent to Zala and Somogy counties) was formed from Bulcsú's territory at the beginning of the 11th century. István Herényi argued Bulcsú possessed the castle Kolon (near Zalakomár) too in the mid-10th century. Pechenegs, along with Khavars and Khalyzians, in the accompaniment of Bulcsú's tribe were also settled in the region, the ancestors of the Tomaj and Osl clans. Herényi considered that the future kindred in the region – for instance, Herény and Kajd arrived with Bulcsú's tribe as military auxiliaries. Bulcsú's territory was adjacent to Lehel's territory in Upper Hungary at the river Rabnitz (Répce).

=== Decline ===
After his army had lost the disastrous Battle of Lechfeld in 955, Bulcsú was caught by the German victors and executed. By the end of the 10th century, the territory of Somogy and Zala counties in Southern Transdanubia was ruled by Koppány, a member of the Árpád dynasty. Ferenc Makk argued that Taksony, who became Grand Prince after the Battle of Lechfeld, invaded and conquered the territory of Bulcsú's tribe sometime between 955 and 958. Then, he relocated Bulcsú's tribe from Lake Balaton to parts to the north and west.

Attila Zsoldos argued that Zerind the Bald (Koppány's father) was granted the territory by Grand Prince Géza (Stephen's father) as a compensation for which he and his descendants were excluded from power, disregarding the principle of seniority. In contrast, György Szabados argued this would have been too big a risk and according to the sources, Géza violently dealt with all his opponents. Györffy considered that Géza confiscated Zalavár and other territories from Bulcsú's descendants. As a result, when Koppány rebelled against Stephen, they swore loyalty to the duke and fought against Stephen.

== During the kingdom ==
The Lád kindred still possessed lands in the region in the mid-13th century, for instance, Badacsonylábdihegy (present-day a borough of Badacsonytördemic). The eponymous estate Lád laid in the region between Badacsonytördemic and Badacsonytomaj. Although they remained landowners in Zala County, but they could not acquire considerable political power for themselves, except Bulcsú Lád, who served as Bishop of Csanád from 1229 to 1254.

Members of the kindred began to call themselves "de genere Werbulchu" (lit. "Blood Bulcsú") from the mid-13th century until the early 14th century, at a time when the demand for interest in the past and respect for the old ancestors increased. Paul, son of Amadeus was called "de genere Werbulchu" in 1318, while he was styled as "de genere Laad" in 1340, proving the identity of the two clans.

=== Various members ===
- Following the ascension of Béla IV to the Hungarian throne, Bata was involved in that investigation committee led by ispán Arnold Hahót in 1236–1237, which supervised and sometimes overruled previous land grants occurred in Zala County.
- Alexander, Amadeus and Stephen (I), mentioned as the relatives of Bishop Bulcsú, sold an estate and mill in Veszprém to Bishop Zlaudus Ják in 1258.
- In 1297, brothers Lawrence and Radik killed a noble of Badacsonytördemic, who was on his way to the Lád church. As a punishment, Badacsonytördemic was separated from the jurisdiction of the Lád church, which the relatives of the murderers – Casimir, Egidius and John (I) were forced to accept. Sometime before 1313, Lawrence and Radik pledged a portion of Gyulakeszi to the provost of Hánta and his brothers. Since the debt could not be given, their relatives Andrew, John (I) and Mark indicated that they are ready to pay the pledge, for which they received the permission from Judge royal John Csák in 1313.
- Sometime before 1318, Paul (I) bought portions in Veszprém and Fajsz from his second cousin Hippolytus, son of Alexander. He sold these estates, together with his inherited portions in 1318.
- John (I), Andrew and Mark sold the aforementioned redeemed property in Gyulakeszi to the Diocese of Veszprém sometime before 1340. In that year, however, Stephen (II), the son of Lawrence reclaimed the property as his rightful inheritance. The diocese summoned the still living Andrew, his son John (II), Peter (II), the son of Mark, Paul (I), the son of Amadeus and Paul (II), the son of Bulcsú to guarantee the validity of the previous purchase. Consequently, there was a lawsuit between Stephen (II) and his relatives, which was concluded by mutual agreement. Stephen (II) faithfully served King Louis I of Hungary. Therefore, he was granted the estate Badacsonytomaj.

== Extinction ==
The Ládi family was the only known offspring of the clan. Its last known male member was litteratus Pál Ládi (or Miketinci), who lived in the early 16th century, and possessed lands in Balaton-mellék and Slavonia until he died without an heir. The ancient estate Lád was devastated during the Ottoman–Habsburg wars.

== Sources ==
- Bácsatyai, Dániel (2024). Bulcsú (in Hungarian). Corvina. ISBN 978-963-13-7016-4.
- Györffy, György (2013). István király és műve [King Stephen and his work] (in Hungarian). Balassi Kiadó. ISBN 978-963-506-896-8.
- Herényi, István (1971). "Bulcsu nemzetségének nyári szállása az Árpádok korában [The Summer Residence of Bulcsú's Kindred during the Age of Árpáds]". Századok (in Hungarian). 105 (2). Magyar Történelmi Társulat: 355–386. ISSN 0039-8098.
- Karácsonyi, János (1900). A magyar nemzetségek a XIV. század közepéig. [The Hungarian genera until the middle of the 14th century] (in Hungarian). Hungarian Academy of Sciences.
- Szabados, György (2011). Magyar államalapítások a IX-X. században [Foundations of the Hungarian States in the 9th–10th Centuries] (in Hungarian). Szegedi Középkorász Műhely. ISBN 978-963-08-2083-7.
- Tóth, Sándor László (2015). A magyar törzsszövetség politikai életrajza [A Political Biography of the Hungarian Tribal Federation] (in Hungarian). Belvedere Meridionale. ISBN 978-615-5372-39-1.
- Zsoldos, Attila (2011). Magyarország világi archontológiája, 1000–1301 [Secular Archontology of Hungary, 1000–1301] (in Hungarian). História, MTA Történettudományi Intézete. ISBN 978-963-9627-38-3.
