= Bulcsú (chieftain) =

10th-century Magyar chieftain and military leader

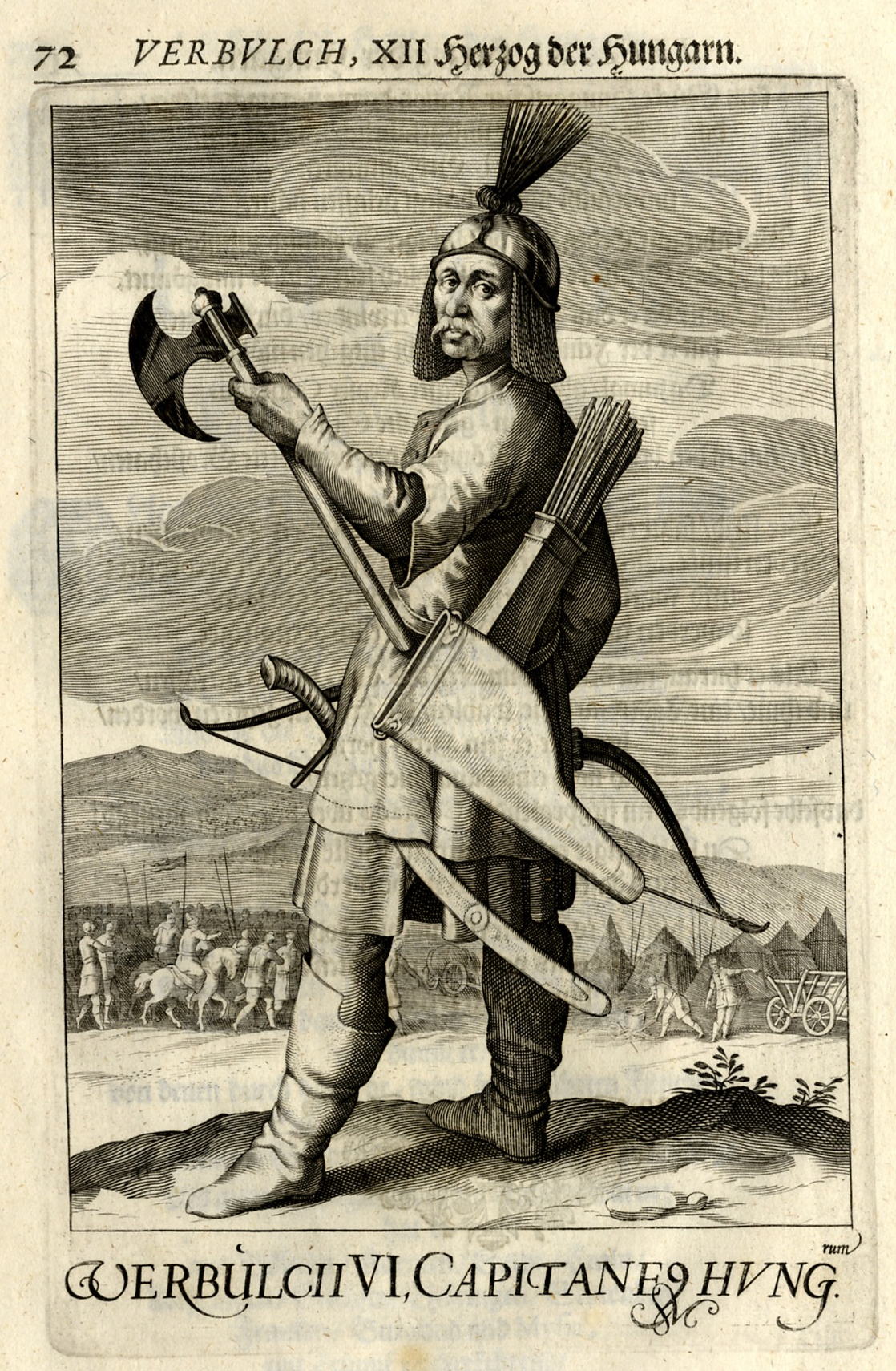
- Chieftain Bulcsú as depicted in the Nádasdy Mausoleum in 1664

Harka
- Reign: fl. 948–955
- Predecessor: Kál
- Successor: unknown
- Born: c. 910 AD; Principality of Hungary
- Baptised: 948; Hagia Sophia, Constantinople, Byzantine Empire
- Died: 15 August 955 (aged c. 45); Regensburg, Duchy of Bavaria
- Noble family: gens Lád
- Father: Kál

Bulcsú (Hungarian pronunciation: [ˈbult͡ʃuː]; or Vérbulcsú; Latin: Bultzus, Greek: Βουλοσουδης Boulosoudes and Βουλτζους Boultzous, Arabic: Wuljūdī; c. 910 – 15 August 955) was a chieftain of the Hungarians and military leader in the 10th century. He held the title of harka (Greek: karchas). Despite not being a member of the ruling Árpád dynasty, he was one of the most important figures of the Hungarian invasions of Europe. He led military campaigns in the direction of the northwest, west, and south during the 930–950s.

In 948, Bulcsú visited the court of Byzantine Emperor Constantine VII, where he was received with great pomp. Bulcsú adopted Christianity, and the emperor became his godfather. He was a "guest friend of the emperor" and was awarded the title of 'patrikios' (patrician).

After his army had lost the disastrous Battle of Lechfeld in 955, he was caught by the German victors and executed. The lands of his tribe lay around Lake Balaton in Transdanubia, the core area of which later formed Zala County.

== Name and etymology ==
The reason he was called Vérbulcsú was that, having learnt of his grandfather's death at the hands of the Germans in the battle of Krimhild, he exacted vengeance by having a number of Germans roasted on a spit, and is said to have behaved with such savagery to them that he drank the blood of certain captives as though it were wine.

— Simon of Kéza: The Deeds of the Hungarians

Bulcsú is one of the only three Hungarian individuals from the 10th century – beside Gyula II and Taksony –, whose name is mentioned by Western (Latin), Byzantine (Greek) and Arabic sources either. Consequently, many variants of his name are known. The contemporary Constantine Porphyrogenitus' De Administrando Imperio refers to him as "Boultzous", a direct translation from Latin variant "Bultzus". His name appears as "Boulosoudes" in the late-11th-century chronicler John Skylitzes' Synopsis of Histories, which work was extracted by John Zonaras in his Extracts of History in the 12th century; Bulcsú is mentioned as "Bolosoudes" there. Among the Western sources, the near-contemporary Annales Sangallenses maiores calls Bulcsú as "Pulszi". His name is mentioned as "Bulgio" by the mid-11th-century Gesta episcoporum Cameracensium. The 16th-century Renaissance humanist historian Johannes Aventinus, who utilized lost 11th-century annals, mentions the name of Bulcsú as "Bultzko" and "Bulichizo". Latin-language works from Hungary call Bulcsú as "Bulsuu", "Bulsu" (Anonymus' Gesta Hungarorum), "Bulchu", "Werbulchu" (Simon of Kéza's Gesta Hunnorum et Hungarorum), "Bulchu", "Bolchu", "Werbulchw", "Uerbulchu" (Hungarian chronicle variants). The name of Bulcsú – (w)l.h.w.d.y, "Wulǧūdī" – can also be found in Kitāb al-Muqtabis fī tarīkh al-Andalus written by 11th-century Muslim author Ibn Ḥayyān.

The etymology of his name is uncertain. According to several linguists – for instance, János Melich, Zoltán Gombocz and, initially, Dezső Pais – his name is of Turkic origin, which has the same source as the Hungarian common name "búcsú" (indulgence). Both words derive from Turkic verb bos ("forgive"), thus Bulcsú is a noun form of the verb, or the noun bošug ("decree of heaven, fate, divine judgment, or command"), i.e. a direct variant of the dignity bošugčï (lit. "commander"). Other historians – e.g. Gyula Pauler – connected Bulcsú's name with the adjective "bölcs" ("wise"), while there were also assumptions that the name is a Hungarian variant of the Latin name Basilius or Blasius. Dezső Pais considered that Bulcsú was named for the purpose of predestination: since it was expected that he would succeed his father in the judicial office of harka, he had to be a man of "forgiving nature and gracious character", which is reflected in his name – though, Bulcsú later became known for his cruel nature. Later, Pais abandoned the theory of connection between Bulcsú's name and the verb bos. He, instead, argued that his name derives from the verb bulya or bulģha ("stir", "to mix"), from which the name of Bulgars originates too. Pais claimed the noun participle bulyučy ("mixer") is the direct antecedent of the chieftain's name. Byzantinist Mátyás Gyóni argued that the De Administrando Imperio wrote down an Old Hungarian name form when describing Bulcsú's name, based on hearsay. He connected his name with a Khazar dignity "bwlšcy", which appears in the 10th-century Schechter Letter. If this assumption is valid, it may also reflect Bulcsú's possible Khavar ethnicity (see below).

The name variant "Vérbulcsú" (lit. "Blood Bulcsú") first appears in the sources in the mid-13th century, when the descendants of the chieftain called themselves "de genere Werbulchu". The origin of this variant is unclear. Anonymus, who wrote his gesta in the early 13th century, already refers to Bulcsú as a "bloodthirsty man" ("vir sanguinis"). Regarding the name variant, Simon of Kéza provides a detailed account of its origin in his Gesta Hunnorum et Hungarorum written in the early 1280s. Accordingly, Bulcsú's grandfather was killed in the legendary battle of Krimhild between the Romans and Huns (see Nibelungenlied), and Bulcsú devoted his whole life to taking revenge on the Germans. Playing the words (spit = veru), Simon refers to the name "Vérbulcsú" in the original Latin text too. Simon describes Bulcsú as "bloodthirsty" and "warlike" with "fearless heart". Although Mark of Kalt, the author of the 14th-century Illuminated Chronicle disregarded Simon's fantastic etymology, but maintained the name variant Vérbulcsú in his work. Dezső Pais argued that the name Vérbulcsú ("vérbocsátó" - "blood provider", then "vérkeverő" – "blood mixer") reflects Bulcsú's status as harka and his possible ceremonial role in the blood oaths among the Magyar tribal chieftains.

== Ancestry and title ==
Tebelis is dead, and it is his son Termatzous who came here recently as "friend" with Boultzous, third prince and karchas of Tourkia. The karchas Boultzous is the son of the karchas Kalis, and Kalis is a proper name, but karchas is a dignity, like gylas, which is superior to karchas.

— Constantine Porphyrogenitus: De Administrando Imperio

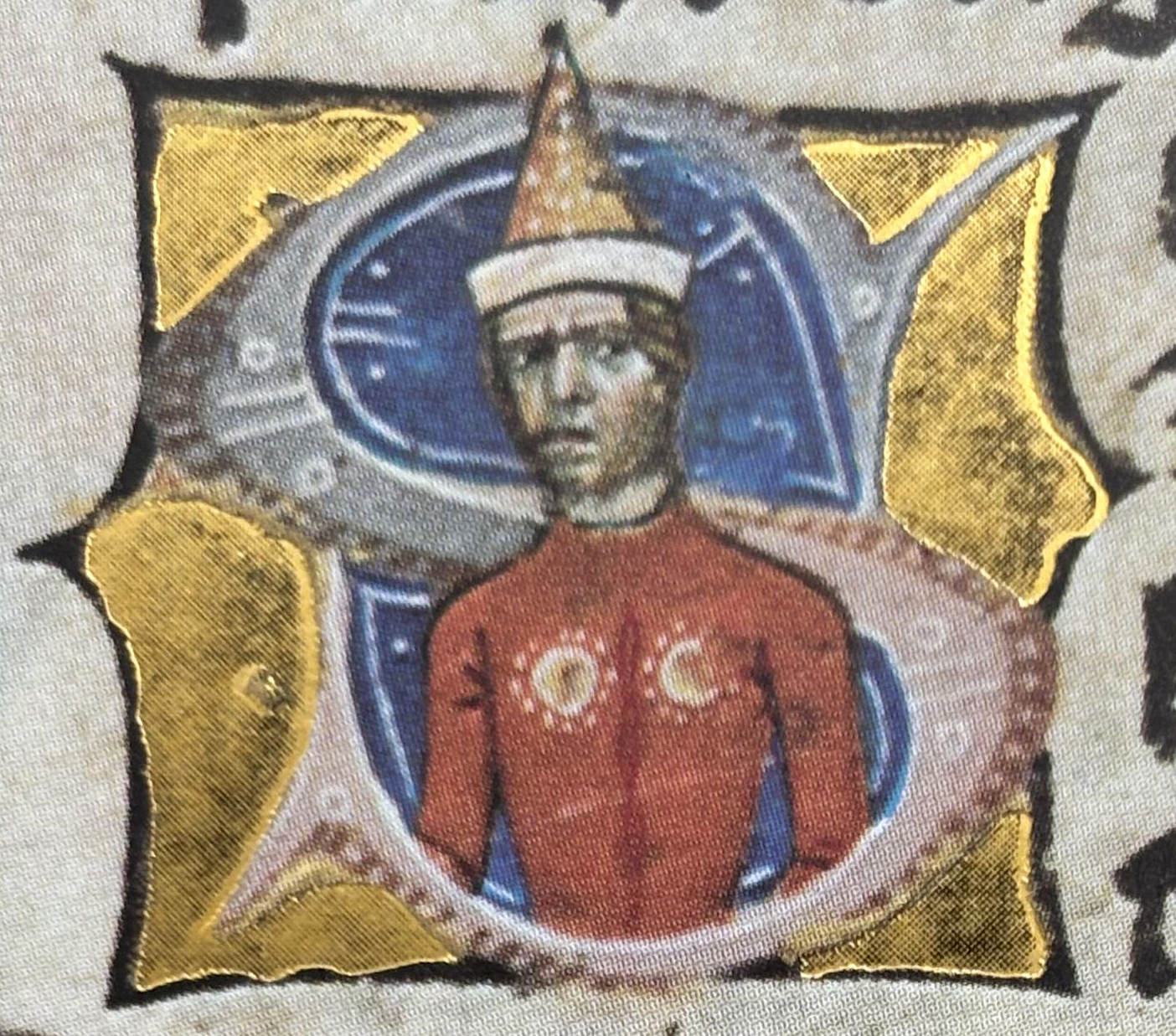
Bulcsú the Sixth Captain among the Seven chieftains of the Magyars (Chronicon Pictum)

Bulcsú was born in the early 10th century, possibly around 910. He had at least one sibling. He was not a member of the ruling Árpád dynasty and only his father's name is known. János Belitzky considered that Bulcsú belonged to the Kér, one of the Magyar tribes, while Sándor László Tóth argued in favor of his belonging to the Tarján tribe. The contemporary De Administrando Imperio states that Bulcsú's father was Kál or Káli (Greek: καλἠ), who held the title of harka prior to Bulcsú's elevation into the position, possibly sometime in the period 910/920–930s. However, Anonymus refers to Bulcsú as the son of Bogát in his Gesta Hungarorum. Bogát (Bugat or Busac) was one of the two leaders of the 921–922 Italian campaign, alongside Tarkacsu (Dursac), Grand Prince Árpád's eldest living son. According to the widespread belief, Constantine and the Byzantine court acquired the information about the Hungarians, among other things, during Bulcsú's embassy, so the majority of historians accepted the first information as authentic. Because of his frequent appearance with the Árpáds, some historians attempted to connect Bulcsú's person to the ruling dynasty. For instance, Bálint Hóman claimed that Kál was the son of Liüntika, while István Herényi considered that Bulcsú was a descendant of chieftain Tétény through his grandfather Bogát and father Kál.

Mátyás Gyóni assumed that Kál and Bulcsú were of Khalyzian or Khavar ethnicity. These groups rebelled against the Khazar Khaganate and joined the Hungarians in the early 9th century, forming three tribes at the time of the conquest. According to András Róna-Tas, Kál then Bulcsú ruled over the joined and/or subjugated peoples, holding the title of harka. A 16th-century Hebrew chronicle from Bohemia also refers to Bulcsú as a Khalyzian. Herényi claimed that Bulcsú belonged to the Khavar tribe called Varsány which settled down in western Transdanubia and carried out border protection duties. Dezső Dümmerth also argued in favor of Bulcsú's Khavar ethnicity, which is why he later emphasized the role of the Khavars in the conquest of the homeland in the Byzantine court and hushed up the presence of Álmos during the events. Linguist Lajos Ligeti considered the Khavar background of the military leader too. György Szabados expressed doubt arguing that the fact of the defeat and expulsion of the Khavars are not downplayed in the 39th chapter of the work.

Bulcsú's title of harka (or karchas) is a subject of historiographical debates. According to the De Administrando Imperio, it was the third most prestigious position in the Principality of Hungary, after the (grand) prince and "gylas" (gyula). Both gylas and karchas "have the rank of judge". According to György Szabados, this information reflects the statehood-nature of the Principality of Hungary and the title of harka was a hereditary position (at least in the relation of Kál and Bulcsú). According to Gyula Kristó, Bulcsú held the title at least from 942, when he was mentioned among the Hungarian chieftains by Muslim author Ibn Ḥayyān. Sándor László Tóth considered that the dignity of harka, a relatively short-lived title, was established sometime between 900 and 920 and Kál was the first office-holder, while Róna-Tas claimed that the title was originally held by Kurszán. It is possible the office was created in order to counterbalance the authority of gyula beside the grand prince. István Herényi considered that Bulcsú ruled over all subjugated people (e.g. Khavars, Székelys, Pechenegs and Kylfings) of the Hungarian tribal federation holding the title of harka, which could originally have been the gyula's deputy or sub-leader. Accordingly, Bulcsú was responsible for the protection of the principality along the western border. Dániel Bácsatyai compared the harka with the dignity tudun of the Avar Khaganate, arguing Bulcsú perhaps governed the western portions of the principality in the name of the grand prince. In this capacity, Bulcsú collected taxes from the settled agricultural (mostly Slavic) peoples.

== Tribal territory ==
The leader of the seventh army was called Vérbulcsú. He is said to have settled at Zala around Lake Balaton.

— Simon of Kéza: The Deeds of the Hungarians

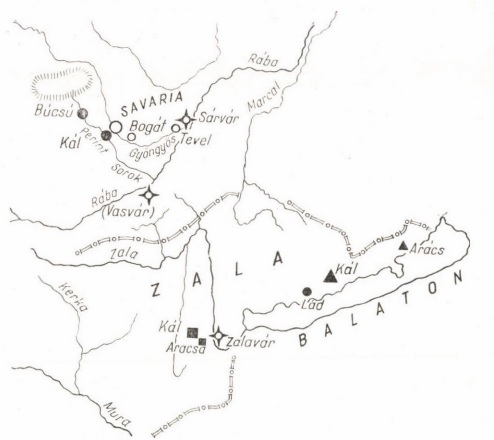
The tribal territory of Bulcsú, according to György Györffy

The 13th-century chronicler Simon of Kéza, who wrongfully attributed Bulcsú's activity to the time of the Hungarian conquest, states that Bulcsú seized the landholdings in Western Transdanubia, around Lake Balaton. The Illuminated Chronicle also says that Bulcsú "is said to have set up his tents near Lake Balaton". The chieftain's descendants, the Lád kindred indeed possessed lands in the region in the mid-13th century, for instance, Badacsonylábdihegy (present-day a borough of Badacsonytördemic). Although there are arguments that later chroniclers referred the Láds' possession area back to the 9–10th centuries, a block in the region that bears the name of Bulcsú's father can be identified from the place names; Instead Bulcsú, Kál (or his father) was that chieftain, who conquered the aforementioned region in the late 9th century. According to György Györffy, his summer residence was the Kál Basin, where present-day Köveskál and Mindszentkálla in Veszprém County preserved his name. A vineyard called Harka is also known in Balatonhenye, also located in the Kál Basin. Continuing west, Kál established his winter residence in present-day Dióskál (at Little Balaton), which laid near the Carolingian fort Mosaburg (Zalavár). Thereafter, Mosaburg became the seat of Kál then Bulcsú's territory. Kál's tribe advanced north along the river Zala, reaching the Rába valley along Lake Neusiedl (Fertő) and the area of Szombathely. There the village Bucsu in Vas County preserved Bulcsú's name, as Györffy considered.

There are several villages in Transylvania and Tiszántúl – for instance, Kál in Heves County – which plausibly bear the name Kál or Bulcsú (and also Bogát). According to Györffy, these are the linguistic memories of the temporary residence areas where Bulcsú's tribe initially seized during the first stage of the Hungarian conquest. According to other arguments, these could also be later name adoptions, since the name Bulcsú was relatively common in the 11–14th centuries.

The ancient and large Kolon County (antecedent to Zala and Somogy counties) was formed from Bulcsú's territory at the beginning of the 11th century. Herényi argued Bulcsú possessed the castle Kolon (near Zalakomár) too in the mid-10th century. Pechenegs, along with Khavars and Khalyzians, in the accompaniment of Bulcsú's tribe were also settled in the region, the ancestors of the Tomaj and Osl clans. Herényi considered that the future kindred in the region – for instance, Herény and Kajd arrived with Bulcsú's tribe as military auxiliaries. Bulcsú's territory was adjacent to Lehel's territory in Upper Hungary at the river Rabnitz (Répce).

Gyula Kristó criticized the method which tries to determine the residence of former tribes based on place names. Based on archaeological excavations, Kristó considered that Bulcsú's territory laid in the region between Drava and Sava, mostly the western portion of Syrmia. Ferenc Makk claimed that Bulcsú's tribe initially settled down in the region between the rivers Maros (Mureș) and Körös, and they were forced to move to Transdanubia, north of Lake Balaton after the Battle of Lechfeld by Grand Prince Taksony.

== Military and diplomatic career ==
=== Early raids ===
According to Bálint Hóman, Bulcsú was a leading figure of the Hungarian invasions into Western Europe since the mid-930s, arguing that the 936–937 campaign follows the same route as in the 950s, indicating Bulcsú's military capabilities, which resembled the military tactics of Attila during his 451 campaign into Gaul. Nevertheless, it is definitely worth noting that all Bulcsú's involvements of pre-948 raids – except the 942 incursion into Iberia – is merely historical speculation, based on the analysis of military tactics and routes.

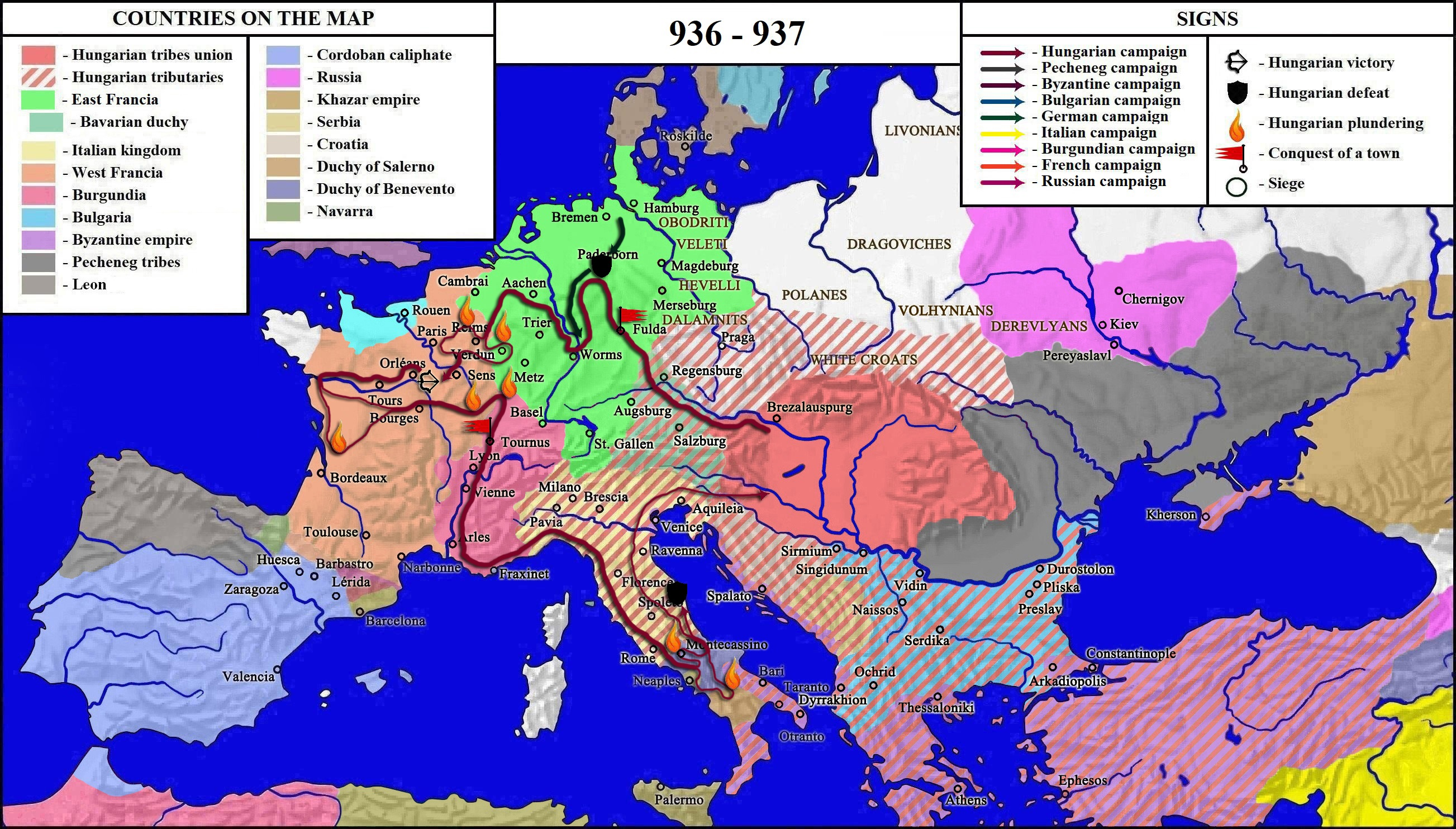
The Hungarian raids in 936–937

In late 936, the Hungarians, with the aim to force the new German king Otto I to pay them tribute, attacked Swabia and Franconia, and burnt the Fulda monastery. They then entered Saxony, but the new king's forces repelled them towards Lotharingia and West Francia in February 937, when Bulcsú's army crossed the Rhine at Worms, and advanced towards Namur. There, the Hungarians seized the Abbey of Saint Basolus in Verzy, which then they used as headquarters to plunder the surrounding area, including the abbeys from Orbay, Saint Macra from Fîmes, the city of Bouvancourt. By late March 937, the Hungarians reached the city of Sens, where they burnt the Abbey of Saint Peter. At Orléans they fought a French army led by Count Ebbes de Déols, who was wounded in the battle and died afterwards. After this, the Hungarians, following the course of the Loire, crossed the whole of France until the Atlantic Ocean, then returned through the South-East, and on their way to Burgundy, they plundered the surroundings of Bourges. After July 937, the Hungarian army entered Burgundy near Dijon, harrying the Monastery of Luxeuil, then they plundered the valley of the Rhône, burnt the city of Tournus, occupied the monasteries of Saint Deicolus and Saint Marcell, but they failed to seize the monastery of Saint Appollinaris. Continuing their campaign, the Hungarians (or at least a contingent) entered Lombardy from the West in August, where Hugh of Italy asked them to go to Southern Italy to help the Byzantines. The Hungarians plundered the surroundings of Capua, and installed their camp in Campania. They sent small units to plunder the regions of Naples, Benevento, Sarno, Nola and Montecassino. The Abbey of Montecassino gave them valuable objects valuing 200 Byzantine hyperpyrons in order to ransom the captives. In contrast to Bálint Hóman, Bácsatyai rejected the concept of conscious campaign organization by Bulcsú arguing that the Hungarians improvised in France after Otto unexpectedly repulsed their attack.

Bulcsú was one of the seven leaders (amīr) who led the Hungarian raid into Iberia in the summer of 942. Arab historian Ibn Ḥayyān preserved his name as "Wulǧūdī" and he is mentioned in the third place among the leaders. Initially, the Hungarians entered the Kingdom of Italy, where Hugh, giving them 10 bushels of gold, encouraged them to attack the Caliphate of Córdoba. Bulcsú and the other chieftains, possibly under the command of Gyula II, attacked Fraxinet, then arrived in Catalonia, plundering the region, before entering the northern territories of the caliphate in mid-June 942. The Hungarians besieged Lérida for eight days then attacked Cerdaña and Huesca. On 26 June, they captured Yahya ibn Muhammad ibn al Tawil, the governor of Barbastro, and held him captive 33 days, until he was ransomed. In July, the Hungarians, running out of food and water, left Iberia. According to other opinions (e.g. György Györffy and András Róna-Tas), the seven chieftains were not the actual leaders of the military campaign, Ibn Ḥayyān was merely recording the seven chieftains of the Hungarian tribes at the time of the Hungarian raid. He was perhaps relying on a Byzantine source. Gyula Kristó argued that it is unlikely that so many high-ranking persons would have jointly led a campaign away from Hungary. Based on the context, István Elter and György Szabados emphasized that the Muslim author lists the actual leaders of the campaign. István Herényi claimed that Bulcsú served as sub-leader behind Gyula during the 942 campaign.

Bálint Hóman also attributed the Hungarian incursions into the Byzantine Empire in 934 and 943 to Bulcsú, allied with the Pechenegs then Kievan Rus', respectively. Both times, Emperor Romanos I Lekapenos bought five-year peace, and accepted to pay a yearly tribute to the Hungarians. It is also possible that Bulcsú participated in that military campaign in 947, when Taksony and his army marched southwards on the Eastern shore of Italy, reaching Otranto and plundering Apulia for three months.

=== Journey to Constantinople ===
The Turks did not discontinue their raiding and ravaging of Roman land until their chieftain, Boulosoudes, came to the city of Constantine under pretence of embracing the Christian faith. He was baptised and received [from the font] by the emperor Constantine who honoured him with the title of patrician and put him in possession of great riches; then he went back to his homeland.

— John Skylitzes: A Synopsis of Byzantine History, 811–1057

Emperor Constantine narrated in his work De Administrando Imperio that Bulcsú, together with Termacsu – a member of the Árpád dynasty and Árpád's great-grandson – led a Hungarian delegation to Constantinople "recently", i.e. around 948. It is likely that they came to extend the five-year peace treaty with Byzantium that had been concluded in 943 as a closure of the last attack on the empire. While Termacsu spoke on behalf of the ruling dynasty, Bulcsú represented the Hungarian aristocracy during their journey, according to György Szabados, who also argued that their joint appearance in the Byzantine court reflects the fact that they represented the unified Hungarian principality (rejecting Kristó's theory of quasi semi-independent "tribal states" in the 10th-century Carpathian Basin) and they were sent to Constantinople by Grand Prince Fajsz. Their diplomatic mission took place when, for the Hungarians, the possibility of regular tribute and looting in the western direction seemed to be completely lost (defeats in 937, 938, 943), thus regular income from Byzantium was vital for the Principality of Hungary. As for Emperor Constantine, he attempted to form a strong and solid alliance with the Hungarians against the First Bulgarian Empire. There are historians' ideas that Bulcsú dominated the diplomatic mission over the young Termacsu, but the wording of Constantine's work ("Termatzous who came here recently [...] with Boultzous") belies this, and Termacsu acted as head of the Hungarians' embassy to Constantinople in 948.

Hungarian historiography has long believed that the embassy of Termacsu and Bulcsú, in addition to other reports, was the main source for Constantine's information about the Hungarians, which he recorded in the 38–40th chapters of his work De Administrando Imperio compiled around 952. István Kapitánffy argued that most information, with the exception of the lineage of Árpád's descendants, is based on earlier (9th century) records. They informed the emperor through a Slav interpreter, who then rendered in Greek. Róna-Tas argued that the visiting Hungarians' statements were probably not delivered directly to Constantine himself, but carefully noted down in the imperial court. They informed the Byzantines on Hungarians living in East. Dezső Dümmerth claimed that Bulcsú consciously magnified the role of the Khavars when narrating the history of the Hungarian events before the conquest (the dependence from Khazars and the story of Levedi) and neglected the role of Álmos. However, this is disputed by most historians as baseless speculation. Gyula Kristó argued that Termacsu and Bulcsú deliberately kept quiet about Álmos' "ritual sacrifice" because it had become a "sensitive and avoidable issue". The 19th-century historians still thought that the parts of the De Administrando Imperio about the Hungarians were compiled from mainly Khazar, Pecheneg and Byzantine reports, refusing the role of Termacsu and Bulcsú's delegation in this context. Based on the linguistic examinations of Zoltán Gombocz and Géza Fehér in the early 20th century, this belief gradually withered away and the Hungarian diplomatic missions to the Byzantine Empire (948, 952) became the primary sources of information. Ádám Bollók and János B. Szabó returned to the 19th-century mainstream arguing that two Hungarian chieftains were responsible only the information of Árpád's descendants which Constantine's work preserved.

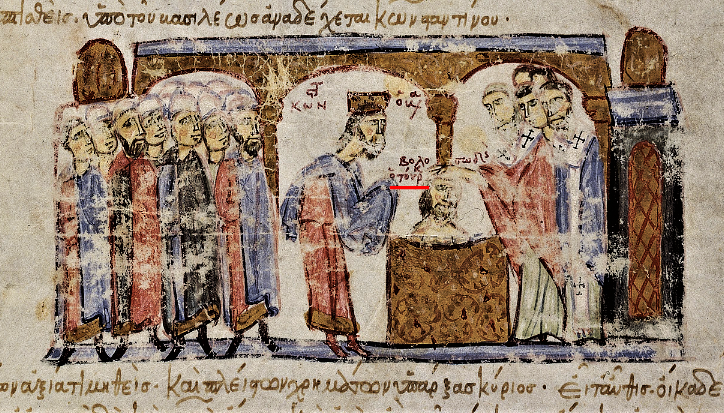
The baptism of Bulcsú depicted in the 12th-century Madrid Skylitzes

The 11th-century chronicler John Skylitzes' narrates in his Synopsis of Histories that Bulcsú converted to Christianity while stayed in Constantinople. During a ceremony with great pomp, Bulcsú was christened at the Baptistry in Hagia Sophia by Emperor Constantine VII and Theophylact Lekapenos, the Ecumenical Patriarch of Constantinople. In addition, Bulcsú was ceremonially granted the title of patrician (patrikios) in the Chrysotriklinos, or Golden Reception Hall, by the emperor, who also became his godfather during his baptism. One of the images of the 12th-century Madrid Skylitzes, an illustrated variant of Skylitzes' chronicle depicts a naked Bulcsú sitting in the baptismal font, on his left are Byzantine bishops, including the patriarch, who holds his hand above the head of the newly converted chieftain. To Bulcsú's right, the emperor stands with a towel in his hand, waiting to dry the man immersed in the water of the cross. John Zonaras, who, among others, extracted Skylitzes' chronicle, also mentions that – merging the two legations occurred in 948 and 952 – Bulcsú and Gyula II "came to the emperor, and both of them partook of the divine bath of rebirth, and were initiated into the sacred mysteries of our religion". An Old Slavic narration, the 15th-century Povesti o latinech ("Narration about the Latins") and the Nikon Chronicle also confirm that "two princes [i.e. Bulcsú and Gyula II] of the Peons [Hungarians], by divine inspiration, along with all their warriors, immediately decided to go as far as the city of Constantine with complete humility and love, hoping to receive holy baptism and the word of divine wisdom, for which they were found worthy. And having received baptism and [accepting] the gospel of Christ, they returned home".

With the act, Bulcsú became the first known Hungarian who converted to Christianity. Constantine was able to demonstrate the transcendence of the Byzantine Empire (long and bright ceremonies, rich gifts, awarding titles, emperor as godfather), which could have meant the hope that the impressed guest would embrace the (at least nominal) acceptance of Byzantium's supremacy. During the process, Bulcsú received generous gifts from the ruler's favor and returned to Hungary as a "rich man". Dániel Bácsatyai considered that for Bulcsú, the baptism served, in addition to the immediate acquisition of wealth, that he was in a difficult situation and perhaps wanted to overcome his internal opponents (perhaps Gyula II) with Byzantine political support. The Byzantine sources state that Bulcsú did not convert out of religious conviction, in contrast to Gyula, who invited priest Hierotheos to convert his people. Skylitzes writes that Bulcsú, "on the other hand, violated his contract with God and often invaded Roman land with all his people". These raids plausibly took place in the first half of the 950s in a direction to the Balkans, but no further information is available. Despite that György Györffy claimed that Bulcsú also invited Greek proselytizing priests, who were able to speak Slavic, to his seat Zalavár after his conversation. István Herényi also attributed the Greek-rite churches (for instance, Rum, Zalaszentiván, Szentkozmadombja) established in Transdanubia to Bulcsú.

=== 954 campaign ===
Upon learning this [the death of his nephew], King Bulgio – at least that is what they said – was furious and mourned the death of his companion, and wanting to take revenge for the premature death of his nephew, he and his men attacked the city again. Then after that they raged very wildly outside, but they resisted firmly inside, they fought for a long time on both sides, they fought with all kinds of weapons. They [the Hungarians] were persistently fueled by anger over the death of a nephew, while they [the citizens of Cambrai] were given courage by the love of their homeland and the ultimate hope.

— Gesta episcoporum Cameracensium

Since the disastrous 938 raid, when the Hungarians were soundly defeated in Thuringia and Saxony against the army of Otto the Great, westward attacks became rare. Despite the dynastic conflicts in Germany in 939 and 941, the Hungarians could not take advantage of the favorable situation. The Battle of Wels also resulted a Hungarian defeat from Berthold, Duke of Bavaria in 943 (or 945). In the same year, when Bulcsú visited Constantinople, two Hungarian armies attacked Bavaria and Carinthia, but they were defeated at Flozzun in Nordgau by Henry I, Duke of Bavaria, Otto's younger brother. There were subsequent skirmishes between Hungarians and Germans along the river Enns (the natural border between the two entities) in 949 and 950, which resulted that Henry I led an army into Western Hungary in 950 or 951, plundering the region and taking captives, this phenomenon occurred for the first time since the Battle of Pressburg (907). Otto's expedition to Italy and his coronation as king also resulted the closure of way to the Hungarian raids into the peninsula. Otto ruled vast territories from Baltic Sea to Adriatic Sea, making the westward aspirations of the Hungarians completely impossible. Henry's invasion affected mainly the tribal territory of Bulcsú in the southwestern part of the Principality of Hungary.

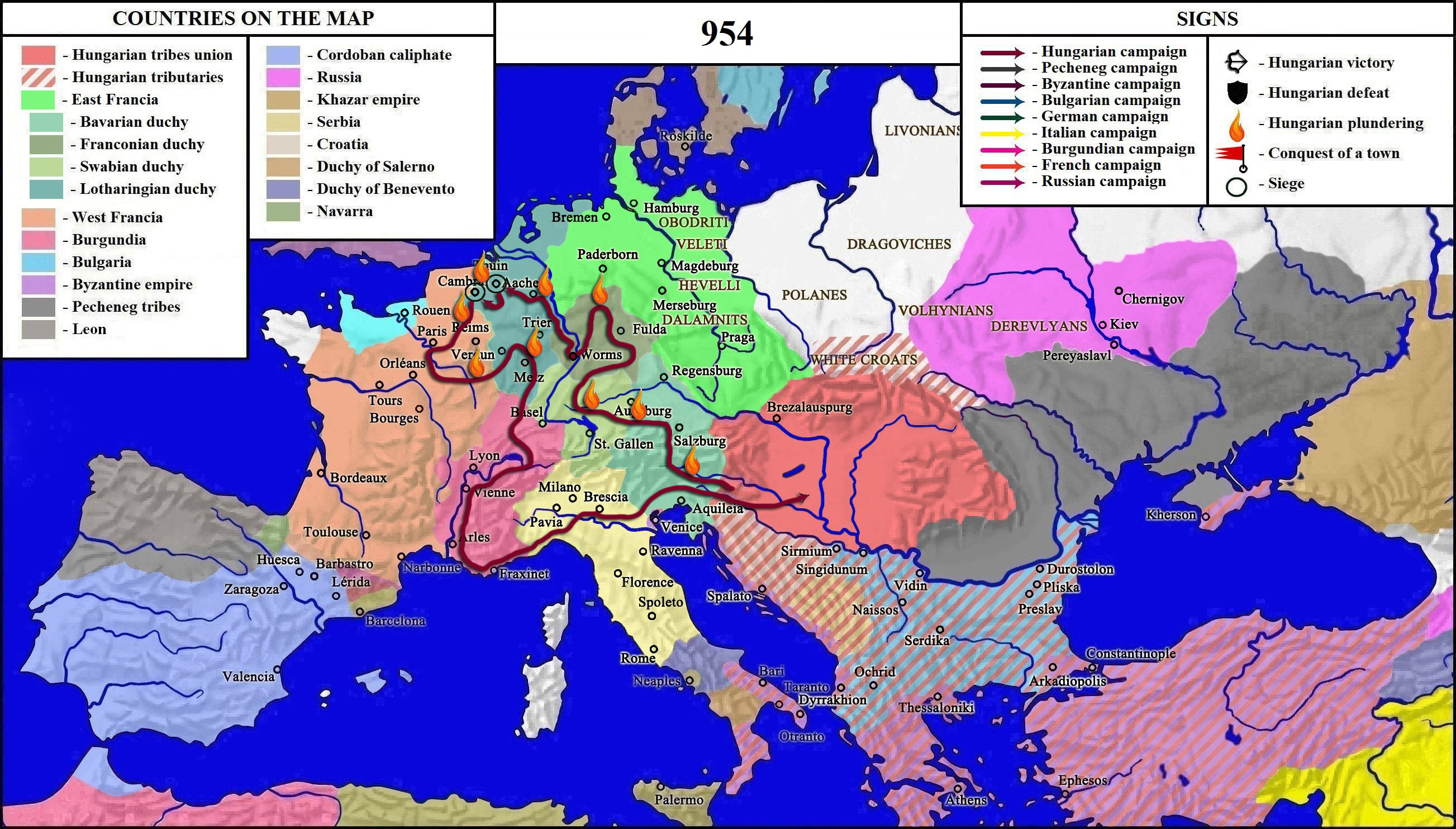
Bulcsú's campaign against East and West Francia in 954

A nationwide rebellion broke out against Otto and his brother Henry in the spring of 953, led by Liudolf, Duke of Swabia (Otto's son) and Conrad, Duke of Lorraine, because of Otto's second marriage with Adelaide of Italy and Liudolf felt his position threatened. Soon, Arnulf II, the Count Palatine of Regensburg, who then governed Bavaria on behalf of Henry during his absent, joined their cause; he was the son of the late Arnulf, Duke of Bavaria and he could not forgive Otto for giving the duchy to his own younger brother Henry in 948. The German army was unable to capture Regensburg and Bishop Ulrich of Augsburg remained the only supporter of Otto in Bavaria by the end of the year. This situation prompted the Hungarians to intervene German domestic affairs, who appeared in Bavaria in the first months of 954. According to the chronicler Widukind of Corvey, the rebellious lords invited the Hungarians to provide assistance against Otto and Henry. Widukind also notes that Liudolf gave large sums to the Hungarians only to spare his own subjects. Thus it is plausible that the rebellious prince concluded an alliance with the Hungarians under pressure.

The Hungarian invasion army, which stormed into East Francia, was led by Bulcsú. They marched into Bavaria through Carinthia. To avoid direct confrontation with Otto's army, Bulcsú managed his light cavalry to Franconia, where they plundered the estates of Ernst, Count of Sualafeld (otherwise, a lord who supported Liudolf's rebellion), taking about a thousand civilian prisoners. In February–March 954, the Hungarians crossed Rhine and arrived to Worms, which paid a ransom to avoid looting on 19 March. Conrad the Red encouraged the Hungarians, "their uneasy ally" to leave into Lower Lotharingia. His army escorted Bulcsú's units till Maastricht in Western Francia. Thereafter, they plundered and devastated Gembloux, Tournai, Wintershoven and Lobbes Abbey in early April, possibly hired by Reginar III, Count of Hainaut. Bulcsú's troops arrived to the walls of Cambrai on 6 April 954. The Gesta episcoporum Cameracensium preserved the name of Bulcsú ("Bulgio") as general of the Hungarian army. Under his leadership, the Hungarians began the siege of the city. They pillaged buildings outside the city walls and seized a lot of civilian property, but most of the townspeople barricaded themselves behind the city walls. A nephew (nepos) of Bulcsú with a small escort left the Hungarian camp to spy on enemy movements, but a small defense unit led by a certain Odo discovered and chased them. Bulcsú's nephew got involved in an unequal struggle, because he did not want to run away because of his pride, unlike his companions. He was killed and his severed head was impaled on a spear on the city wall. Hearing this, Bulcsú was enraged and began a desperate four-day siege to regain the head, but the Hungarians could not capture Cambrai. Bulcsú was ready to give up all booty and prisoners in exchange for the head, but the townspeople suspected a ruse. Having failing the capture of the city itself, the Hungarians looted and devastated the nearby Church of St. Géry. Bulcsú decided to leave Cambrai on 10 April. After the pillaging of the regions of Vermandois, Laon, Reims and Châlons-sur-Marne, the Hungarians moved to Burgundy, from where they went home via Italy. For the German rebels, the Hungarians did not offer any assistance. When Otto again laid siege to Regensburg in mid-954, the Hungarians had been abandoned East Francia for months. Arnulf was killed during the siege while Liudolf swore loyalty to his father, along with Conrad. Bulcsú was unable to make Bavaria a permanent marching ground for the Hungarians again, and after the departure from East Francia, the goal of the campaign became purely the acquisition of booty.

=== Defeat at Lechfeld ===
In the meantime, when they were preparing for battle both inside and outside, Berthold, son of Arnulf came from the castle called Reisenburg to the king of the Hungarians [Bulcsú] and informed him of the arrival of the glorious King Otto. As soon as he heard this, he blew his horn, which was known to the whole army, and at the sound of the horn the whole army left off the battle of the city, and hastened to confer with the king. And he, having discussed the situation with his men, stopped fighting against the city by God's gift and marched against the glorious king with the intention of crushing him with his men and returning as a victor to freely occupy the city and the entire country.

— Gerhard: Vita Sancti Udalrici

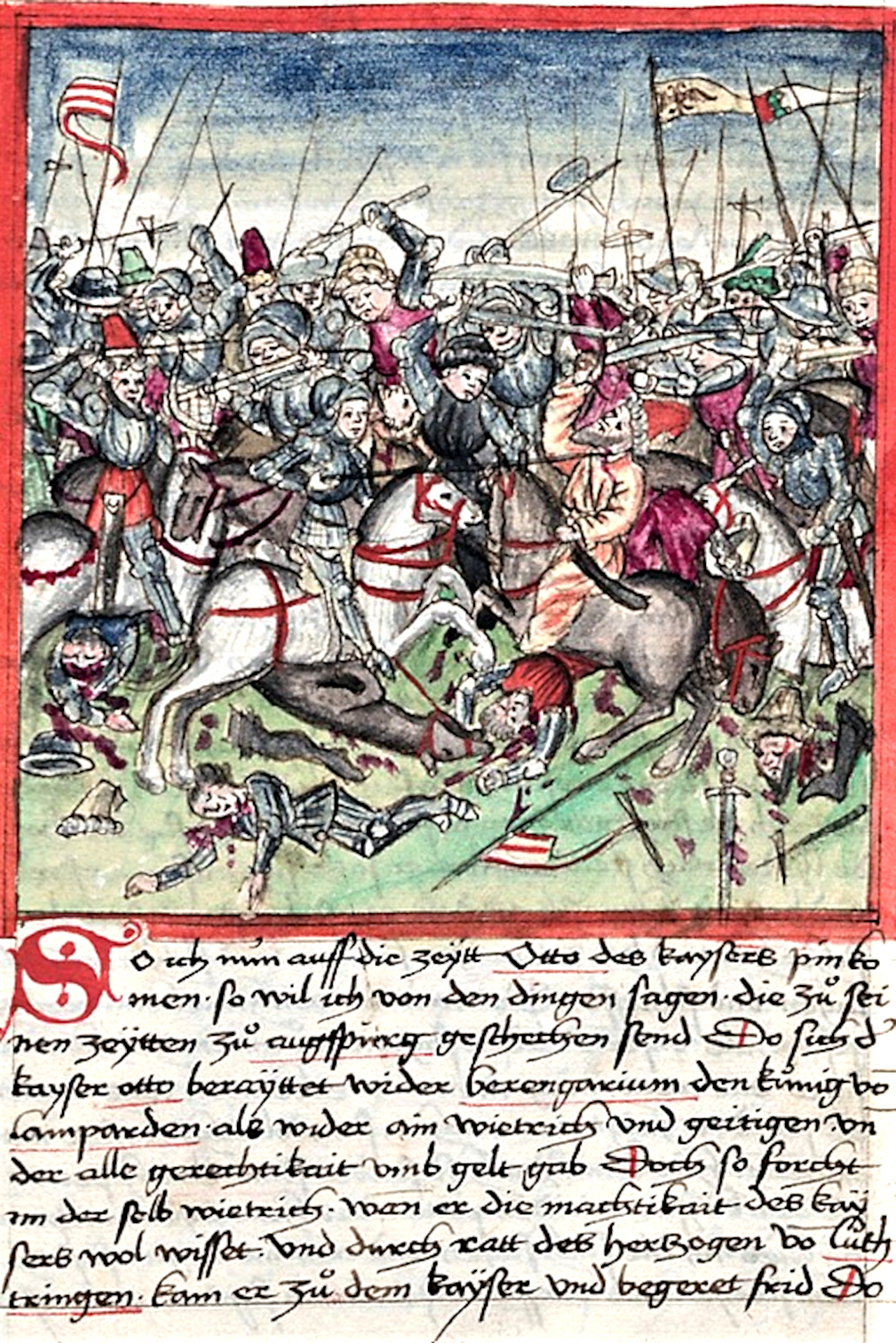
The Battle of Lechfeld, from a 1457 illustration in Sigmund Meisterlin's codex of Nuremberg history

The domestic politics in Bavaria remained tense between Henry and his local opponents, which resulted clashes at Mühldorf in the spring of 955. Leaving Saxony, Otto and Henry laid siege to Regensburg after Easter. After a stiff resistance, as their supplies ran out, the city surrendered, ending the civil war broke out in 953. However, the internal situation hardly improved after the defeat of the rebellion, as the nephews of Prince Hermann of Saxony frequently raided the duchy, allying with the Polabian Slavs. Otto left Bavaria for Saxony thereafter. In early July, the monarch received Hungarian legates, who claimed to come in peace, but who the Germans suspected were actually assessing the outcome of the rebellion, as Widukind narrates. Soon, couriers from Henry arrived to inform Otto in Magdeburg of a Hungarian invasion. Widukind states that Otto "acting as if he had not endured any labor in the war just ended, began to march against the enemy. He took a small force with him, and particularly few from among the Saxons, because they were now threatened by a war with the Slavs". Flodoard claims that the Hungarians' original destination was West Francia, as the year before. Gyula Kristó considered that the Hungarians wanted to take advantage of the German domestic political turmoil as soon as possible, before it finally subsided and Otto stabilized his power.

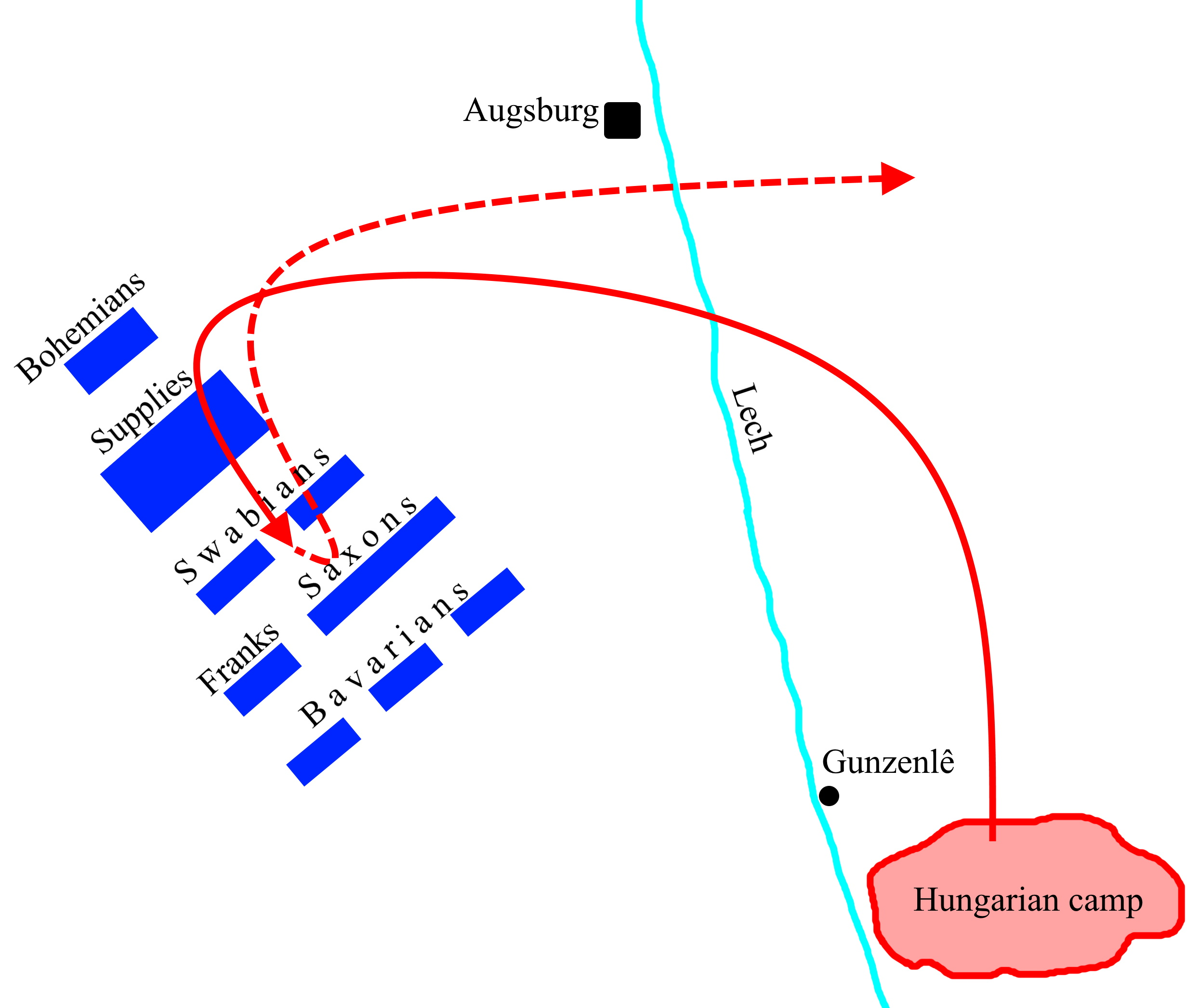
Map of the battle

The Hungarians stormed into Bavaria in mid-July 955. Their army was led by Bulcsú and his sub-commanders were Lehel (a member of the Árpád dynasty) and Súr (possibly of Pecheneg origin). According to the 16th-century historian Johannes Aventinus, Taksony and Csaba also served as Bulcsú's lieutenants during the campaign. Tóth argued that the 955 campaign was a large-scale military expedition in which the entire forces of four or five tribes participated. The Annales Sangallenses maiores considers the Hungarian army consisted of 100,000 warriors, in fact Bulcsú and his lieutenants commanded 8,000–10,000 horse archers. According to Gerhard of Augsburg, who wrote the hagiography of Bishop Ulrich, the Hungarian invaders "devastated the land of Noricum (i.e. Bavaria) from the Danube to the Black Forest, which goes to the mountainous regions". Thereafter, the Hungarians crossed the river Lech, reaching Swabia, where plundered the region around Augsburg and looted many churches, including Saint Afra church, devastating whole Swabia from the Danube to Iller. In early August, Bulcsú ordered the gathering of Hungarian raiding units in Lechfeld at the walls of Augsburg, because he decided to besiege the episcopal city with the siege engines he brought with him. The Hungarians calculated that the city promises to be easy prey, because in the previous year's civil war, the city suffered a lot from Arnulf's attacks. However, Augsburg was bravely defended by its bishop Ulrich, who ordered his soldiers to not fight the Hungarians in the open and reinforce the main south gate of the fortress instead. Simon of Kéza mentions that the Hungarians harassed Augsburg with attacks all day and night. That means before the real siege they wished to take the city by rushes. After the harassment of the smaller units did not reach their goal, Bulcsú sent large crowds to break down the eastern gate of the city and occupy the city walls on 8 August. Ulrich led his professional milites soldiers out into the field to engage the enemy in close combat. According to him, the Hungarians could enter the gates anytime, however they lost their attacking commander during the skirmish, and withdrew to their camp taking the body. During the night, the defenders took positions in all towers and the Hungarians completely surrounded the city with siege engines and infantry, who were driven forward by the whips of the Hungarian leaders. Next day, on 9 August, when the fights barely started they were informed by the traitor Berthold of Reisensburg, the son of the late Arnulf that Otto I deployed his troops near. Bulcsú ordered to suspend the siege, and the Hungarian leaders held a war council. Bulcsú and his lieutenants decided to abandon the siege and the Hungarian army set out to meet Otto's army, hoping that their victory will ultimately mean the surrender of the city and the entire kingdom.

Under Bulcsú, the Hungarians immediately crossed the river Lech to surprise the German army that was just standing up on 10 August. They hastily moved to the rear of the army, where they began to decimate the Bohemian legion that was standing in the rear with their arrows, obtaining the army supplies. They advanced to attack Otto's sixth and seventh legions (the Swabians led by their duke Burchard III), scattering their troops. As a result, Otto sent Conrad the Red and his fourth legion (the Franks) rearwards, who successfully liberated the captives, recovered the loot and drove away the marauding Hungarian units. A melee then ensued between the Hungarians and Otto's main army, consisted of Saxons and Bavarians, which was fatal for the Hungarian light infantry. The Hungarians began to flee frantically across the Lech river. Some sought refuge in nearby villages, where locals attacked and massacred them. The Annales Sangallenses maiores says that Bulcsú was taken prisoner already on 10 August. Otto and his army, who also suffered heave losses (including Conrad), spent the night in Augsburg, where Bishop Ulrich welcomed them. On 11 August, the king specifically issued the order that all river crossings were to be held. The Bohemian auxiliary army commanded by Boleslaus I, Duke of Bohemia clashed with a large fleeing group of the Hungarians in the eastern part of Lechfeld on 11 August, where Lehel and Súr were captured near the fort of Ebersberg. Most of the Hungarians were killed or captured a day or two after the battle, when Otto gradually blocked the escape route from them.

== Execution ==
After the battle, Bulcsú and his two lieutenants, Lehel and Súr were taken to Regensburg "within days" (as Ulrich's hagiography states), where, under the supervision of the ailing Duke Henry (who did not participate in the battle and soon died), they were condemned to death and executed in the square by the duke's palace. The circumstances of their death have been recorded by many contemporaneous and later sources in different ways. Widukind says that "three leaders of the Avar [Hungarian] people were captured and led before Duke Henry. They were sentenced to a bad death, which they deserved. For their necks snapped from being hanged." The Annales Sangallenses maiores writes that "many [Hungarians] were captured and hanged together with their king, called Pulszi [Bulcsú]". The Necrologium Weissenburgensis states that the executions occurred on 15 August 955. Johannes Aventinus narrates that the prisoners were handed over to "Eberhard, leaders of the Bavarians, who then sent the king [Bulcsú] and the four princes [Lehel, Súr, Taksony and Csaba] to Duke Henry of Bavaria in Regensburg. Where in front of the eastern gate, which faces Hungary, they were dragged to the gallows and killed with a rope". Simon of Kéza writes that "when they saw what had happened, Lél and Bulcsú sought remedy in flight. They boarded a boat and set off down the Danube, hoping to make Hungary. However, they were intercepted as they passed Regensburg and sent captive to the emperor (sic!). The emperor condemned them to be hanged, and they were executed on the gallows at Regensburg. [...] The truth, as recorded in the chronicles, is that they foolishly uttered shameless blasphemies before the emperor and said that if they were put to death, in future no German captives would be allowed to live but would either be condemned to servitude forever or put to death without trial".

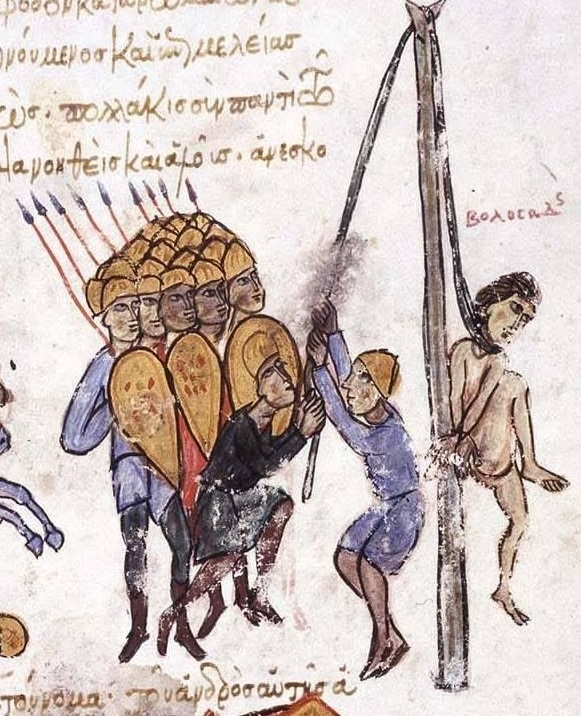
The execution of Bulcsú depicted in the 12th-century Madrid Skylitzes

Apart from Western sources, Byzantine works also narrate the execution of Bulcsú. John Skylitzes writes that he was "seized and impaled by Otto their [Franks'] emperor", while John Zonaras mentions that Bulcsú "was crucified" by the Franks. The Madrid Skylitzes depicts a naked Bulcsú with his hands tied as he is hung from a rope over a forked rod with one knee raised. Legal scholar Pál Szabó pointed out that the two Byzantine works use the Greek verbs (a)naskolopizw, a)nastaurw which describe the type of execution a special fork-shaped gallow was useful to both hanging and crucifixion, citing the work of Theophylact Simocatta and the Madrid Skylitzes' aforementioned illustration. The Byzantine legal terminology used the verb from Latin furkidzó for this type of execution. The original chronicler probably wrote about the hanging (in line with Western sources), which was then distorted in the public mind through later translations.

The execution of Bulcsú and his two sub-commanders were extraordinary in the 10th century. In previous years (for instance, 924 and 938), it was observed that a huge ransom or non-aggression pact were demanded for the captured warlords. Kristó considered that Otto knew that in the Hungarian military there was an extraordinary cult surrounding the leaders, whose loss could have a paralyzing effect (954) he resorted to this harsh punishment as a further deterrent to the Hungarians to launch invasions westwards. The contemporary Ulrich hagiography written by Gerard also emphasizes that the hanging of the Hungarian leaders was done "for the disgrace of their people". Györffy argued the execution of Bulcsú and Lehel caused a psychological shock in Hungary; in accordance with the Hungarian mythology, the three leaders became servants of the Germans in the afterlife, and since they were buried ingloriously and without a sign, they meant misfortune to the living. Despite the fact that only a part of the Hungarian army was lost there (this is proven by the campaigns towards Byzantium until 970), the Hungarians no longer dared to attack the west. Bácsatyai argued the executions could appear to be a necessary sacrifice to achieve lasting peace, and the Hungarians were forced to abandon their gyepű land between the rivers Traisen and Enns. There are also opinions – István Bóna – that Bulcsú's execution was initiated by Otto's younger brother, the violent and cruel Henry.

== Aftermath ==
By the end of the 10th century, the territory of Somogy and Zala counties in Southern Transdanubia was ruled by Koppány, a member of the Árpád dynasty, who laid claim to the Hungarian throne against Grand Prince Stephen in 997. Bálint Hóman and Sándor László Tóth claimed that Zerind the Bald and his son Koppány held the title of harka after Bulcsú's death. Ferenc Makk argued that Taksony, who became Grand Prince after the disastrous Battle of Lechfeld (and thus Aventinus wrongly claimed that he was executed in 955 too), invaded and conquered the territory of Bulcsú's tribe sometime between 955 and 958. Then, he relocated Bulcsú's tribe from Lake Balaton to parts to the north and west. Attila Zsoldos argued that Zerind the Bald was granted the territory by Grand Prince Géza (Stephen's father) as a compensation for which he and his descendants were excluded from power, disregarding the principle of seniority. In contrast, György Szabados argued this would have been too big a risk and according to the sources, Géza violently dealt with all his opponents. Györffy considered that Géza confiscated Zalavár and other territories from Bulcsú's descendants. As a result, when Koppány rebelled against Stephen, they swore loyalty to the duke and fought against Stephen.

Henrik Marczali, Bálint Hóman and Sándor László Tóth claimed that Zerind and Koppány descended from Bulcsú, thus they were not members of the ruling Árpád dynasty. Archaeologist Géza Nagy also argued that Koppány was the descendant of Bulcsú and his aim was to prevent the concentration of the three princely dignities (grand prince, gyula and harka) in one person. However, after Bulcsú's death, the harka position no longer appears in the sources and Szabados considered that the localization of Koppány's territory did not coincide with the area of Bulcsú.

Bulcsú's descendants, the Lád genus (also known as Vérbulcsú in the second half of the 13th century) remained landowners in Zala County, but they could not acquire considerable political power for themselves, except Bulcsú Lád, who served as Bishop of Csanád from 1229 to 1254. The Ládi family was the only known offspring of the clan. Its last known male member was litteratus Pál Ládi (or Miketinci), who lived in the early 16th century, and possessed lands in Balaton-mellék and Slavonia until he died without an heir. The ancient estate Lád was devastated during the Ottoman–Habsburg wars.

== Legacy ==
=== Tradition ===
In this place the illustrious captains Lél and Bulcsú were made captive and brought before the emperor. When he asked them why they were so cruel towards the Christians, they replied: "We are the great God's vengeance, destined by Him to be a scourge unto you, and therefore we are captured and slain by you when we cease to persecute you." To which the emperor replied: "Choose what death you wish to die." Lél said to him: "Let my horn be brought to me, and when I have blown a blast upon it I will answer you." So his horn was brought to him, and coming near to the emperor he made as if to blow it, and then with his horn he smote the emperor so strongly upon the forehead that with that single blow the emperor was dead. "You shall go before me," he said to him, "and will be my slave in the other world," for the Scythians believe that whomsoever they kill in their lifetime, these are obliged to serve them in the next world.

— Illuminated Chronicle

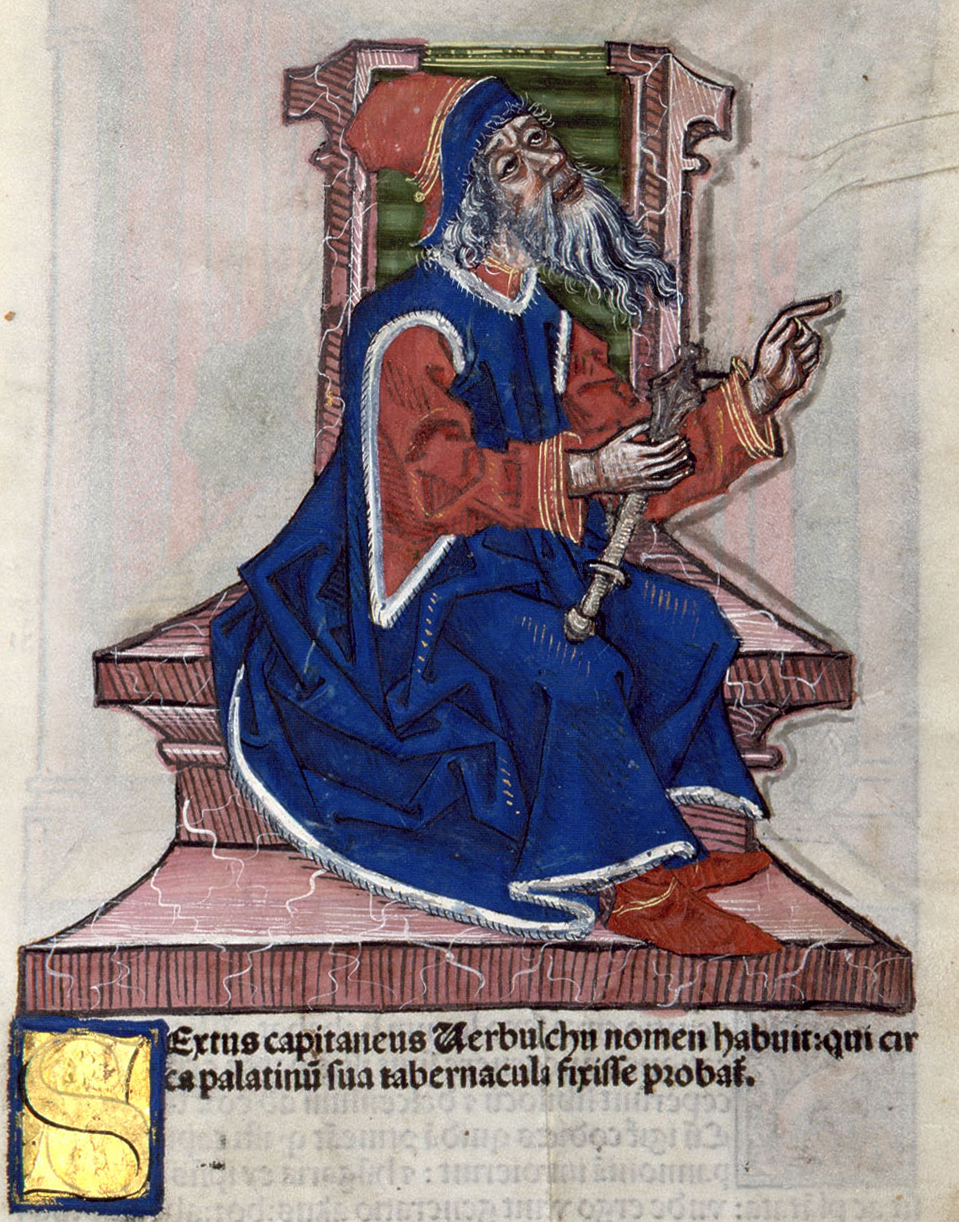
Captain Vérbulcsú depicted in the 15th-century Chronica Hungarorum

The 10th-century Hungarian invasions of Europe and the pagan chieftains like Bulcsú represented an ambivalent legacy for the Christian medieval Hungarian kingdom established in 1000, where the new self-identity and national sense of self prevailed at the same time. Bulcsú's personality stood out so much looking back in later centuries that even though his actions were already forgotten, the 13th-century chroniclers Anonymus and Simon of Kéza both put his live to the era of the Hungarian conquest (late 9th century), a generation or two earlier. Anonymus' Bulcsú (a son of Bogát) was a "chief man and commander" of Árpád. Together with Lehel and Botond, he fought against local Bulgarian lord Salan and his Byzantine allies in the Danube–Tisza Interfluve. Thereafter, they captured forts in Slavonia. The Gesta Hungarorum says when the child Zolta succeeded his father Árpád as grand prince, Bulcsú, Lehel and Botond fought in Carinthia and Lombardy. Anonymus erroneously claimed that Bulcsú and Lehel were executed after the defeat at Inn in 913. Simon of Kéza listed Bulcsú ("Vérbulcsú") the seventh of the seven chieftains of the Hungarians, who led the people to conquer the Carpathian Basin. The Illuminated Chronicle preserved this list and Bulcsú is mentioned as the sixth captain. Later chronicles utilized this text (for instance, Chronica Hungarorum); Bulcsú is also depicted in full-length portrait as the 6th Captain of Hungary in the 17th-century Nádasdy Mausoleum.

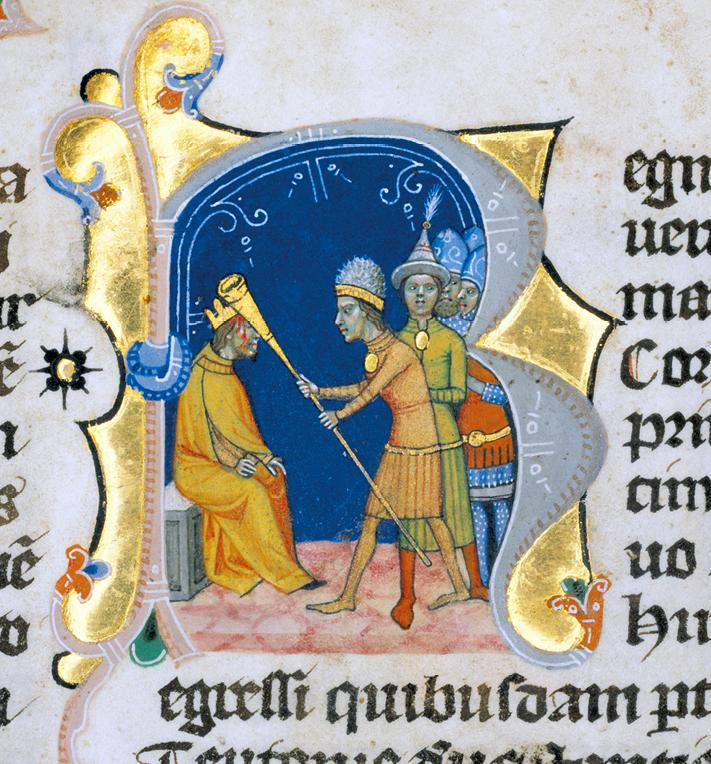
Captains Lehel and Bulcsú front of the German Emperor (Chronicon Pictum)

The execution of Bulcsú and Lehel created the folk legend "Lehel's Horn", which attempted to offset the heavy defeat of the Hungarians at the Battle of Lechfeld and reflecting on the fact that the leaders did not die an inglorious death and did not become servants of their enemies in the afterlife. The mid-13th century chronicler Ákos preserved this oral tradition in his addition of the Urgesta, which thus became part of the text of the Illuminated Chronicle and the other variants. In contrast, Simon of Kéza remained skeptical about the reliability of the legend; "Some authors give a different version of their fate, telling a fanciful story of how when they were brought before the emperor one of them [Lehel] struck the emperor on the head with his trumpet and killed him. Of course this is quite implausible, and anyone believing such a tale would be making an exhibition of his credulity. After all, felons are normally brought before princes with their hands bound".

Bulcsú's character may have influenced German folktale literature as well; according to Heinrich Kunstmann, the name of Hunnic chieftain Craco, who appears as the antagonist in the Dollingersage (which has common roots with the legend of Rasso), is derived from the harka, the title of Bulcsú. Kunstmann argued that "in the allegorical duel in Regensburg, which symbolized the victorious battle in Augsburg, the harka Bulcsú transformed into the pagan Craco, represented the camp of the vanquished", when he was defeated by knight Hans Dollinger, a symbol of the German Christians. Kunstmann identified the knight, who was previously in prison for insulting majesty, with Liudolf, Otto's rebellious son, who later reconciled with his father.

=== Historiography ===
Bulcsú was the most influential and most frequently mentioned military leader in the last phase of the Hungarian invasions of Europe. Despite this, his cult in Hungarian historiography only developed in the 20th-century Interwar Hungary through Bálint Hóman, who wrote the medieval period of the high impact monograph series Magyar történet (1928). Despite that Bulcsú's name is explicitly mentioned only regarding the 954–955 campaigns, Hóman attributed the large-scale expeditions (937) to him, comparing his military skills and the concept of his campaigns to Attila's wars against the Western Roman Empire and Bayan I against the Byzantine Empire. Hóman described Bulcsú as an example of an "eminently talented Oriental diplomat-general". In mainstream historiography, the prominence of Bulcsú faded away in the late 1950s, when György Györffy established his concept of the rapid disintegration of tribes at the beginning of the 10th century. Accordingly, Bulcsú was degraded from the image of a sovereign, independent chieftain to the executor and general of the Árpád dynasty's central princely authority. Dániel Bácsatyai, who wrote the first monograph about the chieftain (2024), marked Bulcsú's death as an epochal boundary in Hungarian history. The historian considered that Bulcsú is a symbol of that two-decade search for a way from the Battle of Riade (933) to the final defeat at Lechfeld (955), when the main sources of income (ransoms, tributes and booty) for Hungarians began to disappear, and this made the decisive test of strength inevitable between Hungary and Western Europe.

After Hóman's work, Bulcsú was included in the pantheon of Hungarian heroes written by the military specialist author Ferenc Julier in 1930. Right-wing politician Endre Bajcsy-Zsilinszky called Bulcsú as a "great warlord, who gave whole Europe a thrashing [...] and the Germans were afraid of him". Bulcsú also began to appear in prose works of fiction. In György Rónay's novel (Namur alatt, 1939), the chieftain is in a dilemma between the ancient faith and Christianity. In Erzsébet D. Kenese's novel (Vérbulcs, 1942), the character repents and pleads with Jesus when he is led to the gallows in Regensburg. Essayist Viktor Padányi, who emigrated to Australia after the World War II, wrote his essay Vérbulcsu in 1955. Padányi, whose work contains several factual errors, described the events from 937 to 955 as the personal duel between Bulcsú and Otto the Great. According to him, all of Bulcsú's actions were aimed at preventing the creation of a German superpower, the Holy Roman Empire. He completely neglected the issue of Bulcsú's baptism. Padányi's essay was utilized by the far-right Neopaganist movement in Hungary after the end of Communism, for instance the picture album Bulcsu (2008) written by Tamás Kubínyi and Sándor Pörzse.

== Sources ==
=== Primary sources ===
- Constantine Porphyrogenitus: De Administrando Imperio (Greek text edited by Gyula Moravcsik, English translation by Romillyi J. H. Jenkins) (1967). Dumbarton Oaks Center for Byzantine Studies. ISBN 0-88402-021-5.
- Widukind of Corvey (2014). Deeds of the Saxons. Translated by Bachrach, Bernard S.; Bachrach, David S. The Catholic University of America Press. ISBN 978-0813226934.
- Wortley, John, ed. (2010). John Skylitzes: A Synopsis of Byzantine History, 811–1057. Cambridge: Cambridge University Press. ISBN 978-0-521-76705-7.
- Anonymus, Notary of King Béla: The Deeds of the Hungarians (Edited, Translated and Annotated by Martyn Rady and László Veszprémy) (2010). In: Rady, Martyn; Veszprémy, László; Bak, János M. (2010); Anonymus and Master Roger; CEU Press; ISBN 978-963-9776-95-1.
- Simon of Kéza: The Deeds of the Hungarians (Edited and translated by László Veszprémy and Frank Schaer with a study by Jenő Szűcs) (1999). CEU Press. ISBN 963-9116-31-9.
- Bak, János M.; Veszprémy, László; Kersken, Norbert (2018). Chronica de gestis Hungarorum e codice picto saec. XIV [The Illuminated Chronicle: Chronicle of the deeds of the Hungarians from the fourteenth-century illuminated codex]. Budapest: Central European University Press. ISBN 978-9-6338-6264-3.

=== Secondary sources ===
- B. Szabó, János (2018). "Koppány népe, hej! Symigtől, Symegig, Koppány duxtól Bulcsu karchaszig – kései széljegyzetek a "Somogy-vitához" [People of Koppány, Hey! From Symig to Symeg, from Dux Koppány to Harka Bulcsú – Late Marginal Notes to the "Somogy County Debate"]". In Kincses, Katalin Mária (ed.). Hadi és más nevezetes történetek. Tanulmányok Veszprémy László tiszteletére (in Hungarian). HM Hadtörténeti Intézet és Múzeum. pp. 18–23. ISBN 978-963-7097-87-4.
- Bácsatyai, Dániel (2017). A kalandozó hadjáratok nyugati kútfői [A Critical Inquiry into the Latin Sources of the 10th-Century Hungarian Incursions] (in Hungarian). HM Hadtörténeti Intézet és Múzeum. ISBN 978-963-7097-83-6.
- Bácsatyai, Dániel (2024). Bulcsú (in Hungarian). Corvina. ISBN 978-963-13-7016-4.
- Bollók, Ádám; B. Szabó, János (2022). A császár és Árpád népe [The Emperor and the People of Árpád] (in Hungarian). BTK Magyar Őstörténeti Kutatócsoport, Források és tanulmányok 8., ELKH Bölcsészettudományi Kutatóközpont. ISBN 978-963-416-304-6.
- Györffy, György (2013). István király és műve [King Stephen and his work] (in Hungarian). Balassi Kiadó. ISBN 978-963-506-896-8.
- Herényi, István (1971). "Bulcsu nemzetségének nyári szállása az Árpádok korában [The Summer Residence of Bulcsú's Kindred during the Age of Árpáds]". Századok (in Hungarian). 105 (2). Magyar Történelmi Társulat: 355–386. ISSN 0039-8098.
- Herényi, István (2008). Bulcsú horka és más tanulmányok [Horka Bulcsú and Other Publications] (in Hungarian). Vol. A Magyar Nyugat Történeti Kiskönyvtára 8. Magyar Nyugat Könyvkiadó. ISBN 978-963-8761-25-5.
- Kordé, Zoltán (1994). "Bulcsú". In Kristó, Gyula; Engel, Pál; Makk, Ferenc (eds.). Korai magyar történeti lexikon (9-14. század) [Encyclopedia of the Early Hungarian History (9th-14th centuries)] (in Hungarian). Akadémiai Kiadó. pp. 132–133. ISBN 963-05-6722-9.
- Kristó, Gyula (1980). Levedi törzsszövetségétől Szent István államáig (From Levedi's Tribal Federation to Saint Stephen's State) (in Hungarian). Magvető. ISBN 963-271-154-8.
- Kristó, Gyula (1985). Az augsburgi csata [The Battle of Augsburg] (in Hungarian). Akadémiai Kiadó. ISBN 963-05-3838-5.
- Kristó, Gyula, ed. (1995). A honfoglalás korának írott forrásai [Written Sources of the Era of the Conquest]. Szeged. ISBN 963-04-5166-2.
- Kristó, Gyula (1998). "Magyar kalandozók német mondákban [The Hungarian Raiders in German Legends]". In Tusor, Péter (ed.). R. Várkonyi Ágnes emlékkönyv születésének 70. évfordulója ünnepére [A Memory Book for Ágnes R. Várkonyi to Commemorate the 70th Anniversary of Her Birth] (in Hungarian). Eötvös Loránd University. pp. 31–35. ISBN 963-4631-41-X.
- Melich, János (1913). "Bulcsú". Magyar Nyelv (in Hungarian). 9 (7). Magyar Nyelvtudományi Társaság: 325–327. ISSN 0025-0228.
- Moravcsik, Gyula (1984). Az Árpád-kori magyar történet bizánci forrásai [The Byzantine Sources of Hungarian History in the Age of Árpáds]. Akadémiai Kiadó. ISBN 978-963-0526-70-8.
- Pais, Dezső (1956). "Bulcsú II. Nyelvészeti fejtegetések [Bulcsú, Vol. 2. Linguistic Explanations]". Magyar Nyelv (in Hungarian). 52 (2). Magyar Nyelvtudományi Társaság: 139–144. ISSN 0025-0228.
- Róna-Tas, András (1999). Hungarians and Europe in the Early Middle Ages: An Introduction to Early Hungarian History (Translated by Nicholas Bodoczky). CEU Press. ISBN 978-963-9116-48-1.
- Szabados, György (2011). Magyar államalapítások a IX-X. században [Foundations of the Hungarian States in the 9th–10th Centuries] (in Hungarian). Szegedi Középkorász Műhely. ISBN 978-963-08-2083-7.
- Szabó, Pál (2012). "»...fogságba került, és ágasra húzatta.« A bizánci források jogi szóhasználata és az akasztás végrehajtásának bizánci gyakorlata Bulcsú kivégzése kapcsán ["...he was captured and hanged." The Legal Terminology of Byzantine Sources and the Byzantine Practice of Hanging in Relation to the Execution of Bulcsú]". Publicationes Universitatis Miskolcinensis, Sectio Juridica et Politica (in Hungarian). 30 (1). Miskolci Egyetem: 161–185. ISSN 0866-6032.
- Tóth, Sándor László (2015). A magyar törzsszövetség politikai életrajza [A Political Biography of the Hungarian Tribal Federation] (in Hungarian). Belvedere Meridionale. ISBN 978-615-5372-39-1.
