= Kál (chieftain) =

10th-century Magyar chieftain and military leader

Harka
- Reign: 910/920–930s (?)
- Predecessor: first known
- Successor: Bulcsú
- Noble family: gens Lád
- Issue: Bulcsú another child

Kál or Káli (Greek: Καλῆ; "Kalis") was a Hungarian chieftain at the turn of the 9th and 10th centuries. He held the title of harka (Greek: karchas). His son was the influential military leader Bulcsú.

== Name and title ==
Tebelis is dead, and it is his son Termatzous who came here recently as "friend" with Boultzous, third prince and karchas of Tourkia. The karchas Boultzous is the son of the karchas Kalis, and Kalis is a proper name, but karchas is a dignity, like gylas, which is superior to karchas.

— Constantine Porphyrogenitus: De Administrando Imperio

The contemporary mid-10th-century De Administrando Imperio is the only source which mentions Kál as the father of Bulcsú, who visited Constantinople in 948 as a member of a Hungarian embassy and was a key informant of the emperor regarding the family relations of the Árpád dynasty. Nor Kál neither Bulcsú were members of the ruling house. However, the early 13th-century chronicler Anonymus' in his Gesta Hungarorum refers to Bulcsú as the son of Bogát. The majority of historians accepted Kál's fatherhood as authentic. Kál had at least another child, because Bulcsú's nephew is mentioned in 954. Because of his frequent appearance with the Árpáds, some historians attempted to connect Bulcsú's person to the ruling dynasty. For instance, Bálint Hóman claimed that Kál was the son of Liüntika, while István Herényi considered that Bulcsú was a descendant of chieftain Tétény through his grandfather Bogát and father Kál.

Archaeologist Géza Nagy derived Kál's name from the Turkic verb kal ("stay"), accepted this theory by linguist Dezső Pais. Its derivative kalu or kalyu is the immediate antecedent of the chieftain's name. Byzantinist Mátyás Gyóni claimed that the name Kál means Khalyzian, thus Constantine's work misunderstood Bulcsú's narration and reflected to his ethnicity. Gyóni assumed that both Kál and Bulcsú were of Khalyzian or Khavar ethnicity. Based on this, László Szegfű considered that Kál and Bogát were identical.

The title harka (or karchas) was the third most prestigious position in the Principality of Hungary, after the (grand) prince and "gylas" (gyula). Both gylas and karchas "have the rank of judge", according to the De Administrando Imperio. Sándor László Tóth considered that the dignity of harka, a relatively short-lived title, was established sometime between 900 and 920 and Kál was the first office-holder, while András Róna-Tas claimed that the title was originally held by Kurszán until his murder in 904 and he was succeeded by Kál thereafter. According to Róna-Tas, Kál then Bulcsú ruled over the joined and/or subjugated peoples, holding the title of harka. As a combination of the narrations of Constantine and Anonymus, László Makkai claimed that initially Bogát, himself possibly a son of Tétény, served as harka until he was elevated to the dignity of gyula which resulted his settlement from the western part of the Carpathian Basin to Transylvania in the early 920s. Kál succeeded him as harka. According to Gyula Kristó, Bulcsú held the title at least from 942, when he was mentioned among the Hungarian chieftains by Muslim author Ibn Ḥayyān. According to György Szabados, this information reflects the statehood-nature of the Principality of Hungary and the title of harka was a hereditary position (at least in the relation of Kál and Bulcsú).

== Tribal territory ==
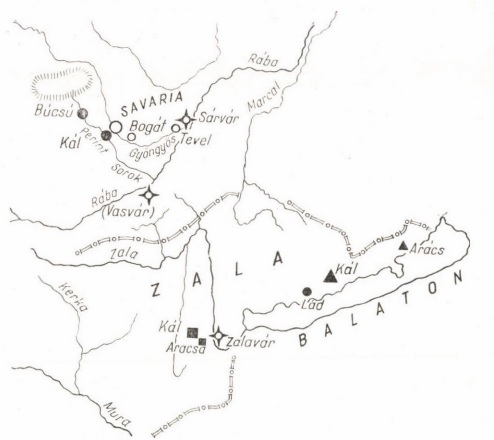
The tribal territory of Kál then Bulcsú, according to György Györffy

According to the chronicle tradition, Bulcsú "have settled at Zala around Lake Balaton". The chieftain's descendants, the Lád kindred indeed possessed lands in the region in the mid-13th century, for instance, Badacsonylábdihegy (present-day a borough of Badacsonytördemic). Although there are arguments that later chroniclers referred the Láds' possession area back to the 9–10th centuries, a block in the region that bears the name of Bulcsú's father can be identified from the place names; Instead Bulcsú, Kál (or his father) was that chieftain, who conquered the aforementioned region in the late 9th century or early 10th century. According to György Györffy, his summer residence was the Kál Basin (also named after the chieftain), where present-day Köveskál and Mindszentkálla in Veszprém County preserved his name. A vineyard called Harka is also known in Balatonhenye, also located in the Kál Basin. Continuing west, Kál established his winter residence in present-day Dióskál (at Little Balaton), which laid near the Carolingian fort Mosaburg (Zalavár). Thereafter, Mosaburg became the seat of Kál then Bulcsú's territory. Kál's tribe advanced north along the river Zala, reaching the Rába valley along Lake Neusiedl (Fertő) and the area of Szombathely. There the village Bucsu in Vas County preserved Bulcsú's name, as Györffy considered.

There are several villages in Transylvania and Tiszántúl – for instance, Kál in Heves County – which plausibly bear the name Kál or Bulcsú (and also Bogát). According to Györffy, these are the linguistic memories of the temporary residence areas where Bulcsú's tribe initially seized during the first stage of the Hungarian conquest. According to other arguments, these could also be later name adoptions, since the name Bulcsú was relatively common in the 11–14th centuries.

== Sources ==
=== Primary sources ===
- Constantine Porphyrogenitus: De Administrando Imperio (Greek text edited by Gyula Moravcsik, English translation by Romillyi J. H. Jenkins) (1967). Dumbarton Oaks Center for Byzantine Studies. ISBN 0-88402-021-5.

=== Secondary sources ===
- Bácsatyai, Dániel (2024). Bulcsú (in Hungarian). Corvina. ISBN 978-963-13-7016-4.
- Györffy, György (2013). István király és műve [King Stephen and his work] (in Hungarian). Balassi Kiadó. ISBN 978-963-506-896-8.
- Herényi, István (1971). "Bulcsu nemzetségének nyári szállása az Árpádok korában [The Summer Residence of Bulcsú's Kindred during the Age of Árpáds]". Századok (in Hungarian). 105 (2). Magyar Történelmi Társulat: 355–386. ISSN 0039-8098.
- Moravcsik, Gyula (1984). Az Árpád-kori magyar történet bizánci forrásai [The Byzantine Sources of Hungarian History in the Age of Árpáds]. Akadémiai Kiadó. ISBN 978-963-0526-70-8.
- Pais, Dezső (1929). "Kál és társai [Kál and Others]". Magyar Nyelv (in Hungarian). 25 (3–4). Magyar Nyelvtudományi Társaság: 121–124. ISSN 0025-0228.
- Róna-Tas, András (1999). Hungarians and Europe in the Early Middle Ages: An Introduction to Early Hungarian History (Translated by Nicholas Bodoczky). CEU Press. ISBN 978-963-9116-48-1.
- Szabados, György (2011). Magyar államalapítások a IX-X. században [Foundations of the Hungarian States in the 9th–10th Centuries] (in Hungarian). Szegedi Középkorász Műhely. ISBN 978-963-08-2083-7.
- Tóth, Sándor László (2015). A magyar törzsszövetség politikai életrajza [A Political Biography of the Hungarian Tribal Federation] (in Hungarian). Belvedere Meridionale. ISBN 978-615-5372-39-1.
