= Bulcsú Lád =

13th-century Hungarian Catholic bishop

- Bishop of Csanád
- Installed: 1229
- Term ended: 1254
- Predecessor: Desiderius
- Successor: Briccius
- Other posts: Provost of Győr; Chancellor

Personal details
- Died: 1254/59
- Denomination: Catholic Church

Bulcsú from the kindred Lád (Hungarian: Lád nembeli Bulcsú, also known as Blaise or Basil; died after 1254) was a Hungarian Catholic prelate in the 13th century, who served as Bishop of Csanád between 1229 and 1254. Prior to that he functioned as Provost of Győr from 1221 to 1229. He was chancellor in the royal court of King Andrew II of Hungary between 1228 and 1229.

== Name ==
Bulcsú (Bölcs) is referred by various name formats in contemporary records, for instance, Bulch, Bulchi, Bulchu, Bulchv, Bulsu, Bulzo or Wulshw. His name also appears as Blaise (Blasius) and Basil (also Vazul, Basilius), mostly in post-Mongol invasion sources. In addition, there is also a single mention of Bulcsú as "Benedict", an obvious typographical error. Because of the different name variants, several historians – including János Karácsonyi and Kálmán Juhász – distinguished the prelates Bulcsú and Blaise (Basil) from each other, considering the latter succeeded Bulcsú as Bishop of Csanád after the 1241–1242 Mongol invasion. However, as historian Attila Zsoldos pointed out, some documents from the pre-Mongol invasion period (in 1232, 1234 and 1240) already refer to the prelate as "Blaise" or "Basil", while a single mention of "Bulcsú" as the incumbent bishop from the year 1245 was also preserved. Therefore, the three name variants covered the same person.

== Early life ==
Bulcsú was born into the ancient Hungarian gens (clan) Lád (also known as Vérbulcsú), which took part in the Hungarian conquest of the Carpathian Basin in the late 9th century. According to Simon of Kéza's Gesta Hunnorum et Hungarorum, the ancestor the kindred was the skilled 10th-century military leader Bulcsú. The clan settled down near the Lake Balaton on the west side of the mountain Badacsony. The eponymous estate Lád laid near present-day Badacsonytomaj and Badacsonytördemic in Veszprém County. Bulcsú's parentage is unknown, but his relatives were Alexander, Amadeus and Stephen, who possessed lands in Veszprém in 1258. Bulcsú had an unidentified brother, who owned a meadow in Keszi of Zala County in 1247.

Bulcsú was possibly born in the second half of the 12th century; In 1237, during an ecclesiastical conflict (see below), he invoked his "old age", but this could also be a factual lie on his part, because he was still alive in 1254. As a royal envoy, Bulcsú visited the Holy See in 1219. By the year 1221, Bulcsú elevated into the position of provost of Győr. He held the office until 1229. In this capacity, Pope Honorius III delegated Bulcsú to that ecclesiastical judicial court to judge the lawsuit between Pannonhalma Abbey and Stephen II, Bishop of Zagreb over the tithes in the lands beyond the Drava river at the turn of 1226 and 1227. He also judged over another lawsuit between the abbey and the Knights Hospitaller. Pope Gregory IX also entrusted Bulcsú to supervise the compliance with the agreement between Uros of Pannonhalma and the superior of Pilis Abbey. These assignments imply that Bulcsú was a connoisseur of canon law.

Replacing Stephen of Zagreb, Bulcsú served as royal chancellor in the court of Andrew II from 1228 to 1229. Upon the request of Uros of Pannonhalma, the Hungarian king entrusted Bulcsú to copy and deposit the former verdicts in favor of the abbey by Archbishop Ugrin Csák and Palatine Nicholas Szák. Bulcsú was skilled in examining the appearance and content of diplomas from the point of view of authenticity. He personally examined the letters of Nicholas Szák in the abbey of Pannonhalma, before confirming and transcribing them. The so-called salva semper preludes (arenga) in the royal charters between 1228 and 1229 connect to Bulcsú's activity as chancellor, but it is plausible that all three documents were formulated in the chancellery of Pannonhalma Abbey. The use of a double introduction and the uniformity of sealing formulas became characteristic of royal charters during Bulcsú's term.

== Bishop of Csanád ==
=== Papal mandates ===
Following the death of Desiderius, Bulcsú Lád was elected Bishop of Csanád in 1229. When Robert, Archbishop of Esztergom initiated the canonization of his late predecessor Lucas in 1231, Pope Gregory IX entrusted Bulcsú and two other clergymen – the abbot of Cikádor and the master of the Knights Hospitaller in Esztergom – on 28 August 1231 to conduct an investigation and send their report to Rome. After receiving the report and the letter in support of Andrew II, the pope ordered papal legate James of Pecorara on 17 February 1233 to deal with the canonization issue among other matters. In March 1232, the pope also commissioned Bulcsú to persuade the bishops of Belgrade and Braničevo (Barancs) in Bulgaria to return to Roman Catholicism from Orthodoxy and – if the two bishops are not willing to do so – place the two ecclesiastical provinces under the jurisdiction of the Diocese of Syrmia in Hungary (the Bulgarian historiography consider the pope's letter sparked a Hungarian–Bulgarian war in that year).

Around the same year, Pope Gregory entrusted him to investigate the jurisdictional conflict between the Kolozsmonostor Abbey and Raynald of Belleville, the Bishop of Transylvania; the prelate ignored and violated the monastery's privileges and rights, while Raynald accused the convention of violating his episcopal rights. After a hearing of both parties in Rome, the pope delegated Bulcsú and two other clerics – the Bishop of Cumania (possibly Theodoric) and the provost of Bethlen (present-day Beclean, Romania) – to judge over the lawsuit in November 1235. During the conclusion of the Oath of Bereg (August 1233), papal legate James of Pecorara instructed Bulcsú and four other Hungarian prelates, whose dioceses were inhabited by a significant number of Muslim or Jewish communities, to separate those people from Christian settlements and ensure the permanence of segregation during their annual cruises. Upon King Andrew's request, Pope Gregory IX allowed the investigation of the separation of non-Christians to take place once every two years after 1235. The pope mandated Bulcsú and two clergymen to judge over the lawsuit between Archbishop Robert of Esztergom and the abbey of Garamszentbenedek (today Hronský Beňadik, Slovakia) in September 1235.

=== Conflict with the Bizere Abbey ===
In the 1230s, Bulcsú Lád was embroiled in a harsh and unprecedented confrontation with the Benedictine abbey of Bizere, which laid on the left bank of the river Mureș (Maros) in Arad County (present-day Frumușeni, Romania). Bulcsú intended to exercise right of patronage (ius patronatus) over the monastery. In response, the unidentified abbot filed a complaint to papal legate James of Pecorara, who resided in Hungary since 1232. Following an investigation process, the legate ruled in favor of the abbot. Bulcsú refused to acknowledge the verdict; his episcopal troops plundered and seized the territory of the Bizere Abbey, capturing and imprisoning the abbot and 32 Benedictine friars. Thereafter, the bishop appointed his confidant, a certain friar Cornelius as abbot of the monastery. Pope Gregory demanded the release of the prisoners and established an investigation court, which suspended Bulcsú from his bishopric and excommunicated some of his confidants, convicting them for sacrilege.

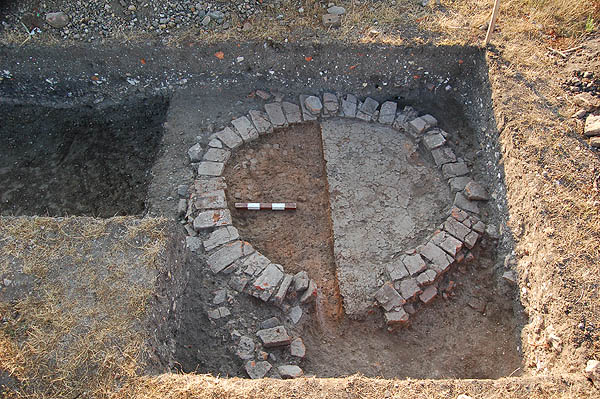
Remnants of the Bizere Abbey near present-day Frumușeni, Romania

Bulcsú released the prisoners and apparently reconciled with the monks, but with passivity prevented the conduct of a proper papal investigation. The pope summoned Bulcsú to visit the Roman Curia, but the bishop was reluctant to do so. Pope Gregory appointed cardinal Rinaldo di Jenne (future Pope Alexander IV) to conduct the papal investigation of the conflict, but due to the absence of the bishop, he did not make a decision. The pope, then, mandated Hungarian abbots Uros of Pannonhalma and N of Szekszárd to represent the interests of the abbey and validate the ecclesiastical censures against Bulcsú and his partisans. Bulcsú continued to ignore their activity, after which the two abbots condemned him with anathema. A papal letter from June 1236 narrates the subsequent events: the conflict deteriorated in an unprecedented way, even among the conditions of the time, when Bulcsú sent another armed force against the monastery. During the skirmish and turmoil, the abbot along with several friars and servants were slaughtered. The perpetrators fled under the protection of the bishop, proving his involvement as instigator of the incident. Pope Gregory IX delegated the abbots of Pécsvárad, Tihany and Ercsi to investigate the crime and perform the excommunication against Bulcsú and his accomplices (including Cornelius). They were mandated to clarify the role of the bishop in the attack too. In September 1236, the pope appointed another three Hungarian clerics – the provost of Szenttamás, the abbot of Vértes and the provost of Zsámbék – to arrange the indemnification of the monastery and the imminent summons of Bulcsú to Rome.

The bishop justified his absence with his old age and severe diseases, including the near-blindness of his eyes. Therefore, Pope Gregory appointed the abbot of Zirc, the prior of the Knights Hospitaller in Hungary and Lucas, the provost of Győr to verify Bulcsú's claims in his letter issued August 1237. If Bulcsú was found unfit to fulfill his dignity, he had to be forced to resign and a new bishop should have been elected to supervise the observance of canon law, according to the papal instruction. Bulcsú sent his envoy (procurator) to Rome, where James of Pecorara dealt with the issue. The envoy emphasized Bulcsú's poor health and questioned the credibility of witnesses regarding previous investigations conducted by the abbot of Pécsvárad and his co-judges. A repeated trial proved that some monks from Bizere were also involved in the massacre on the bishop's side. These persons were excommunicated to, also maintaining the validity of previous judgments against Cornelius and his companions. The pope renewed the mandate of Lucas and his co-judges in 1238. The Holy See ordered to appoint auxiliary bishops to assist the "seriously ill" Bulcsú, but the investigation process did not find the bishop so ill that this would have been necessary, and sent their report to Rome by July 1238. Pope Gregory authorized his chaplain Johannes de Civitella, who resided in Hungary during that time, and the abbot of Pilis in February 1241 to examines Bulcsú's state of health. The pope suspected that the previous investigators had all covered for the bishop, withholding the truth from the Holy See. The imminent Mongol invasion of Hungary, which was followed by the death of Pope Gregory IX and a multi-year sede vacante from the end of the year swept Bulcsú's case away simultaneously in Hungary and the Holy See.

=== Mongol invasion and aftermath ===
However, when Bishop Bulcsú of Csanád and Nicholas son of Barc, together with many noblemen, tried to move their wives, sons, daughters and servants to upper Hungary and then quickly join the king's army, they were confronted by Cumans and fought very hard with them. Unable to resist them, almost all perished by the sword. While the fighting was going on, the bishop, lying sick in a carriage, was taken away with a few companions. The Cumans then wasted the land just like the Tatars [Mongols]; they assembled and crossed the Danube from this side and hastened, thus wasting, towards the March [Syrmia].

— Master Roger's Epistle to the Sorrowful Lament upon the Destruction of the Kingdom of Hungary by the Tatars

The Mongols broke through the barricades erected in the Verecke Pass (Veretsky Pass, Ukraine) and invaded the Kingdom of Hungary on 12 March 1241. When the citizens of Pest realized the presence of Cumans in the invading army, mass hysteria emerged. The townsfolk accused their leader Köten and their Cumans of cooperating with the enemy. A riot broke out and the mob massacred Köten and his retinue on 17 March 1241. On hearing about Köten's fate, the Cumans decided to leave Hungary. Bulcsú Lád and Nicholas Szák was among those prelates and barons, who attempted to join the royal army in order to clash with the advancing Mongols. According to historian Kálmán Juhász, the troops of the diocese, in addition to the armies of local ispáns William of Kraszna, Saul of Arad and Demetrius Csák of Csanád summoned near Temesvár (today Timișoara, Romania), where from their united army marched into Central Hungary. However their army, accompanied by a large number of civilian refugees, were confronted by the fleeing Cumans in the Danube–Tisza Interfluve, who looted and destroyed many villages on their way towards the Balkan Peninsula via the region Syrmia. Their army crossed the marauders in the central parts of the kingdom, where the Cumans perished them in late March 1241. Nicholas Szák was killed in the skirmish, while Bulcsú Lád seriously injured and could narrowly escape. The bishop fled to his clan's estates on the northern shore of Balaton, where he waited for the withdrawal of the Mongols until the spring of 1242.

Csanád (today Cenad, Romania), the episcopal see was seized and set on fire by the Mongols led by Böyek (Bogutai), while the whole region was occupied and looted. Under Bulcsú, the demolished St. George cathedral in Csanád was reconstructed, in addition to the Holy Savior church and the Benedictine church of St. Mary in the town. He reorganized the parishes throughout the diocese. Bulcsú initiated the fortification of several towns, churches and monasteries in the territory of his diocese, learned from the experiences of the Mongol invasion. The newly elected Pope Innocent IV instructed Bulcsú on 7 July 1243 to consecrate Stephen Báncsa, the new Archbishop of Esztergom. The pope also ordered Bulcsú, Bishop Zlaudus Ják of Veszprém and the abbot of Pilis to investigate the circumstances of the election and aptitude of Philip Türje as Bishop of Zagreb in 1248. Bulcsú was last mentioned as a living person in 1254. He was succeeded by Briccius, first mentioned in this capacity in 1259.

== Sources ==
=== Primary sources ===
- Master Roger's Epistle to the Sorrowful Lament upon the Destruction of the Kingdom of Hungary by the Tatars (Translated and Annotated by János M. Bak and Martyn Rady) (2010). In: Rady, Martyn; Veszprémy, László; Bak, János M. (2010); Anonymus and Master Roger; CEU Press; ISBN 978-9639776951.

=== Secondary sources ===
- Barabás, Gábor (2015). A pápaság és Magyarország a 13. század első felében. Pápai hatás – együttműködés – érdekellentét [The Papacy and Hungary in the First Half of the 13th Century. Papal influence – cooperation – clash of interests] (in Hungarian). Pécsi Történettudományért Kulturális Egyesület. ISBN 978-963-89482-5-0.
- C. Tóth, Norbert; Horváth, Terézia (2019). A győri székeskáptalan archontológiája 1200–1458 [Archontology of the Cathedral of Győr, 1200–1458] (in Hungarian). Győri Egyházmegyei Levéltár. ISBN 978-615-5035-16-6.
- Juhász, Kálmán (1930). A csanádi püspökség története alapításától a tatárjárásig (1030–1242) [The History of the Diocese of Csanád from its Foundation to the Mongol Invasion (1030–1242)] (in Hungarian). Csanádvármegyei Könyvtár 19–20.
- Juhász, Kálmán (1933). A csanádi püspökség története (1243–1307) [The History of the Diocese of Csanád (1243–1307)] (in Hungarian). Csanádvármegyei Könyvtár 24.
- Karácsonyi, János (1901). A magyar nemzetségek a XIV. század közepéig. II. kötet [The Hungarian genera until the middle of the 14th century, Vol. 2] (in Hungarian). Hungarian Academy of Sciences.
- Markó, László (2006). A magyar állam főméltóságai Szent Istvántól napjainkig: Életrajzi Lexikon [Great Officers of State in Hungary from King Saint Stephen to Our Days: A Biographical Encyclopedia] (in Hungarian). Helikon Kiadó. ISBN 963-208-970-7.
- Veres, Kristóf György (2019). "A magyar királyi kancellária okleveles gyakorlata 1172 és 1235 között [The institutional practice of the Hungarian royal chancery between 1172 and 1235]". Turul (in Hungarian). 92 (1). Magyar Heraldikai és Genealógiai Társaság: 1–26. ISSN 1216-7258.
- Zsoldos, Attila (2011). Magyarország világi archontológiája, 1000–1301 [Secular Archontology of Hungary, 1000–1301] (in Hungarian). História, MTA Történettudományi Intézete. ISBN 978-963-9627-38-3.

Bulcsú Genus Lád Born: ? Died: 1254/59
Political offices
Preceded by Stephen	Chancellor; 1228–1229	Succeeded by Albert
Catholic Church titles
Preceded by Desiderius	Bishop of Csanád; 1229–1254	Succeeded by Briccius
