= József Egry =

Hungarian painter

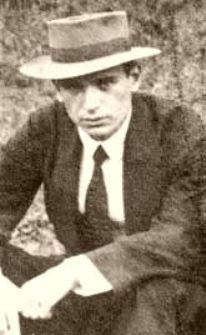
- Born: Egry, József; 1883; Zalaújlak
- Died: 1951 (aged 67–68); Badacsonytomaj

József Egry (1883–1951) was a Hungarian painter, considered a significant representative of Hungarian modernism.

== Life ==
He was a self-taught painter. Spent a year in Paris with the help of Károly Lyka. From there he entered the College of Fine Arts with Pál Szinyei Merse and Károly Ferenczy. He was an exhibiting artist from 1910.

In 1911, he reached Belgium, where he was greatly influenced by the figures of the painter and sculptor Meunier, who portrayed port workers. For a few years, he himself painted workers living on the outskirts of the city in a summary style in a golden-brown color scheme.

He also studied in Munich and Vienna in 1904 and at the Académie Julian in Paris in 1905. He continued his studies in Brussels. Egry's works were Expressionist and Constructivist in nature. He was called as painter of Lake Balaton.

During World War I, he suffered a serious accident during training, after which he was sent to the Badacsony military hospital. There he met his future wife Juliska Pauler, who worked as a volunteer nurse at the hospital.

In the 1920s, he began to deal with the transforming power of light. At first, he approached the cult of the sun with expressionist symbolism, painting troubled, restless pictures with individual strength. He developed a mixed oil-pastel technique in order to work with incorporeal surfaces suitable for halo phenomena.

The atmosphere permeated by light remained his theme throughout. He found orderliness between 1924-1929. "I wear holiday clothes for my soul when I paint." "He who enters nature loses his reality." The image of a rainbow was inspired by the rainbow semicircle seen on Grünewald's altar in Isenheim, a symbol of life after death. He included this in his own observations of light phenomena. His self-portraits and the Herald, which is a hidden self-portrait, are documents of his loneliness.

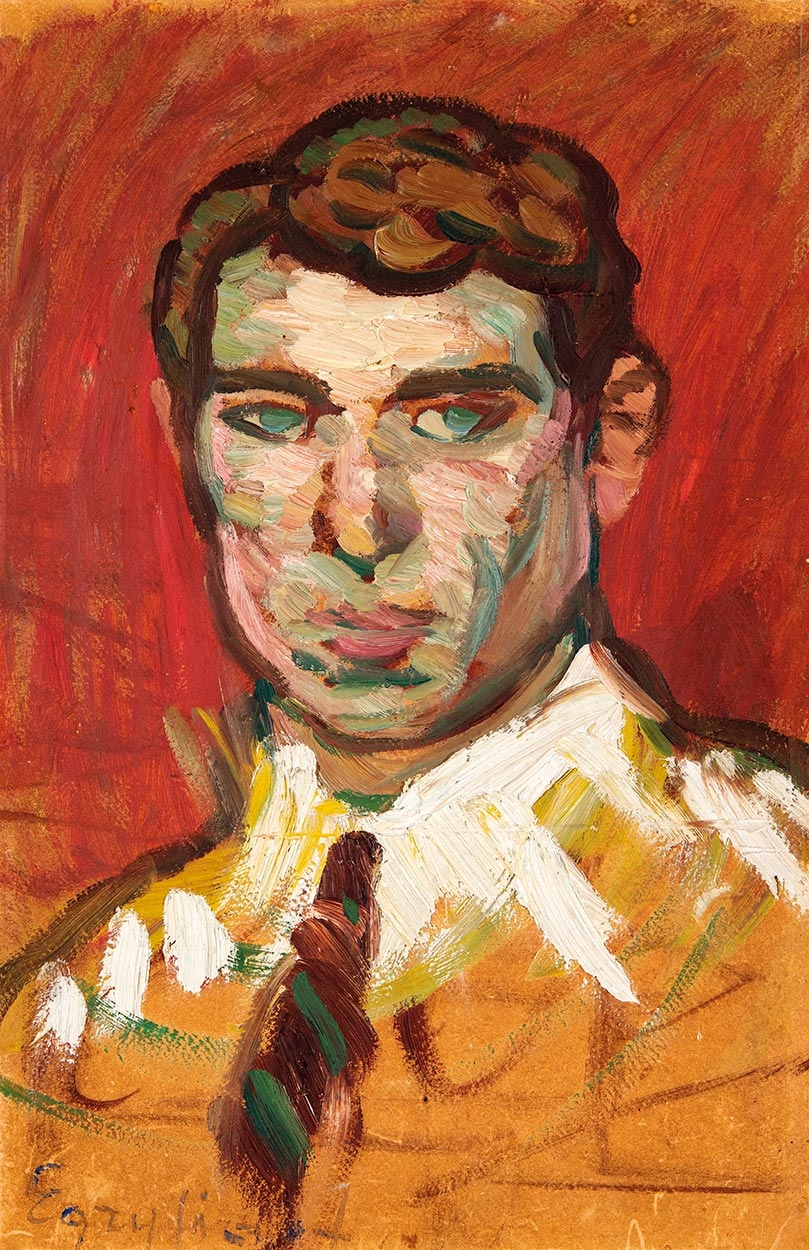
Self portrait

Partly due to his deteriorating health as a result of his war injuries, he went on trips to Italy, mainly to Sicily. His works Taormina (1930) and then Nervi (1938) came from these trips. The bright lights he saw there solidified his ideas.

His works varied a theme, mainly the Balaton landscape. It disassembles and edits at the same time. This is a new interpretation of naturalism, which is a completely original sound in European painting.

His last completed work is the 1944 Golden Gate.

In 1948, he was one of the first to receive the Kossuth Prize. He died in Badacsony in 1951 and is buried in the Badacsony-Tomaji cemetery. His widow died in 1957.

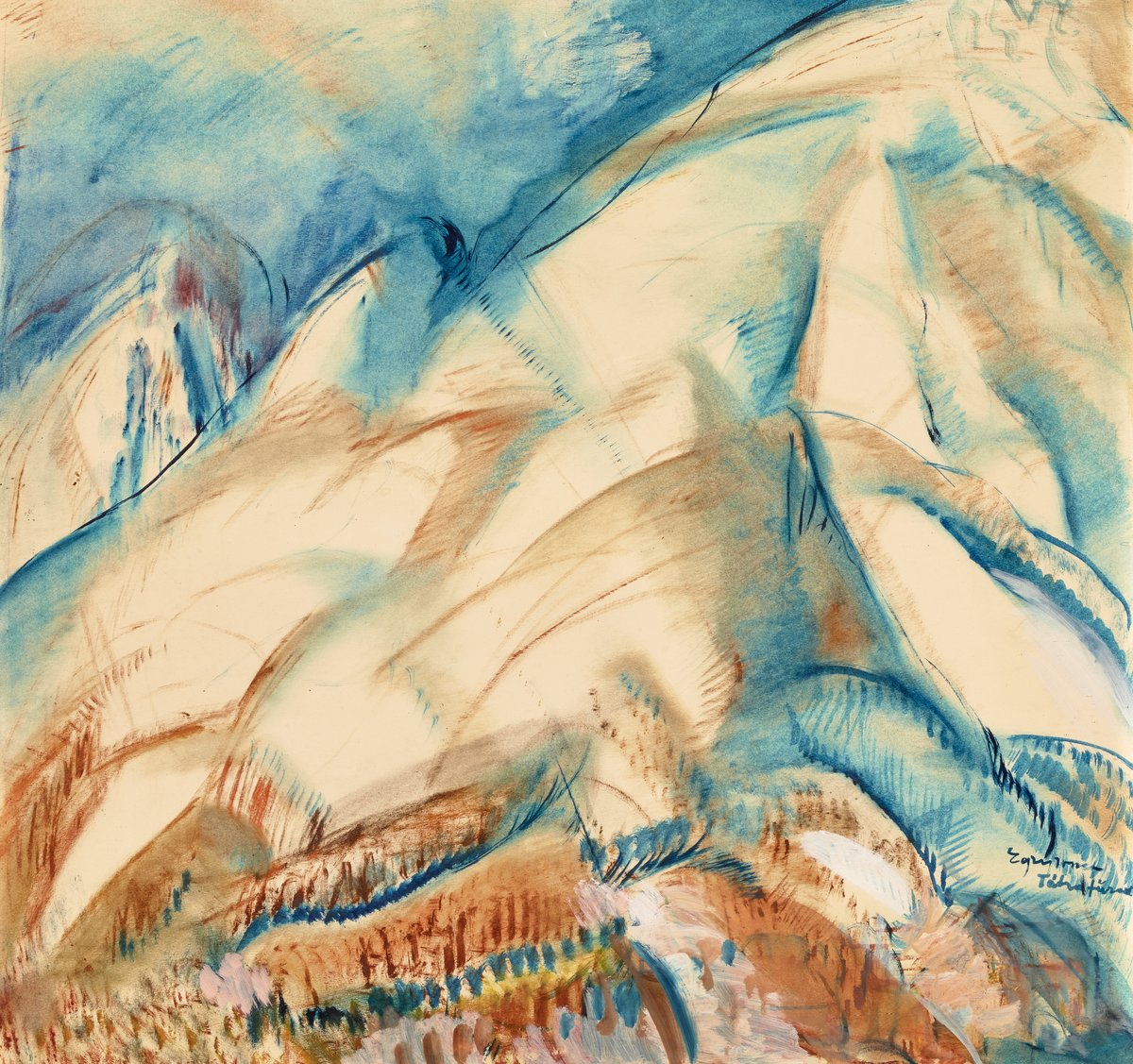
Tatra

== Sources ==
- Benezit Dictionary of Artists. Vol. 4/123. 2013-01-10.
- Vollmer encyclopedia. Vol. 2/16. 2013-01-10.
- Cyclopaedia of Hungarian Painters and Graphic Artists. Vol. 149. 2013-01-10.
- Art Encyclopedia. Vol. I/589. 2013-01-10.
