= Gregory (bishop of Csanád) =

13th-century Hungarian Catholic bishop

- Bishop of Csanád
- Installed: 1275
- Term ended: 1293 or later
- Predecessor: Briccius
- Successor: Anthony
- Other post: Chancellor

Personal details
- Died: 1293/98
- Denomination: Catholic Church

Gregory (Hungarian: Gergely; died between 1293 and 1298) was a Hungarian Catholic prelate in the 13th century, who served as Bishop of Csanád from 1275 to at least 1293. He was a confidant of Ladislaus IV of Hungary, briefly serving as his last chancellor between 1289 and 1290.

== Career ==
19th-century diocesan schematisms incorrectly identified him with Gregory Bicskei. His origins and early ecclesiastical career are unknown. Following the death of his predecessor Briccius, Gregory was elected Bishop of Csanád sometime in April or May 1275. He is referred to as bishop-elect in the documents between 30 May and 17 June. His election was confirmed by Pope Gregory X not long before 11 July 1275. He is styled as "elected and confirmed" bishop until 27 July 1275.

=== Cuman threat ===
Gregory's episcopal tenure coincided with a political turmoil in Hungary, the era of so-called "feudal anarchy". Ladislaus IV and his court visited the episcopal see Csanád (present-day Cenad, Romania) in June 1278, where the rebellious Stephen Gutkeled swore loyalty. Following that, the Gutkeled troops constantly harassed the properties of the diocese in the region. Gregory also had to deal with the situation of Cumans, who lived in large numbers in the territory of the diocese. The arriving papal legate Philip of Fermo summoned a general assembly in July 1279, which adopted the so-called Cuman laws in order to baptize and settle the nomadic people. The text prescribed that the Cumans should leave their tents and live "in houses attached to the ground". In addition, the laws recorded the place of the final settlement of the Cumans in the land, among others, between the rivers Temes (Timiș) and Maros (Mureș). In the latter respect, Philip entrusted Gregory with a baron and two local noblemen to visit each Cuman tribes (or clans) in the region between the two rivers in order to supervise the enforcement of the Cuman laws. Gregory had to baptize the still pagan people and had to compile a census of the uninhabited noble and castle warrior estates so that the nobles who lost their land could compensate.

During Philip's stay in Hungary, Gregory received papal mandates too. The legate refused to confirm the election of Thomas as the Bishop of Várad, because he was not ordained priest within a year after his election as provost of Vasvár despite the regulation of the Second Council of Lyon (1274). The chapter of Várad demonstrated that the rule applied only to the provosts of pastoral chapters, while Vasvár was a collegiate chapter. Pope Martin IV entrusted prelates John Hont-Pázmány of Kalocsa, Pouka of Syrmia and Gregory of Csanád to investigate the case in June 1282. The three prelates ruled in favor of Thomas; thereafter Gregory participated in the consecration of the bishop alongside Archbishop John Hont-Pázmány.

For the upcoming years, the Diocese of Csanád became the victim of the deterioration of the case of the Cumans. The Cumans rebelled against the royal power around July 1282, looting and pillaging the region between the rivers Tisza and Maros. For instance, they stormed Egres Abbey, where a large amount of royal treasury was kept. The Battle of Lake Hód, where the revolt was ultimately suppressed, also located in the territory of Gregory's episcopal see. The Cumans also plundered the estates of local influential lord Thomas Csanád (although the document which narrates his ordeals is a non-authentic forgery), when his letters of donations were burnt and destroyed. After the battle, Ladislaus IV instructed Gregory and his cathedral chapter to determine the estates of the lord by interrogating Thomas' relatives and neighbors. As a result of Gregory's investigation process, the king confirmed Thomas' estates in April 1285.

=== Royal chancellor ===
Ladislaus IV spent the last years of his life wandering from place to place, while Hungary's central government lost power because the prelates and the barons ruled the kingdom independently of the monarch. The king, who preferred the Cumans' way of life, usually resided in the Diocese of Csanád. He stayed in Kevevára (today Kovin, Serbia) in August 1286, within the walls of Egres Abbey in September 1288 and in Csanád throughout the first half of 1289. Gregory was one of the few barons and prelates in Hungary, who kept their loyalty to the king and remained members of his dwindling entourage. Gregory was appointed royal chancellor sometime between February and June 1289, replacing Thomas, Bishop of Vác. Sometimes he is incorrectly styled as vice-chancellor by contemporary documents, which demonstrates the regression of the bureaucratic system in the last regnal years of Ladislaus. It is plausible that Gregory held the office until the king's murder in July 1290. As a papal inquiry was carried out to find out "whether the king died as a Catholic Christian", Gregory transferred Ladislaus' body to his episcopal see, where he was buried in the St. George Cathedral of Csanád.

Gregory took an oath of allegiance to the new monarch Andrew III. He was last mentioned as bishop in July 1293. His successor Anthony first appeared in this dignity only in 1298.

== Sources ==
- Juhász, Kálmán (1933). A csanádi püspökség története (1243–1307) [The History of the Diocese of Csanád (1243–1307)] (in Hungarian). Csanádvármegyei Könyvtár 24.
- Markó, László (2006). A magyar állam főméltóságai Szent Istvántól napjainkig: Életrajzi Lexikon [Great Officers of State in Hungary from King Saint Stephen to Our Days: A Biographical Encyclopedia] (in Hungarian). Helikon Kiadó. ISBN 963-208-970-7.
- Zsoldos, Attila (2011). Magyarország világi archontológiája, 1000–1301 [Secular Archontology of Hungary, 1000–1301] (in Hungarian). História, MTA Történettudományi Intézete. ISBN 978-963-9627-38-3.

Catholic Church titles
Preceded by Briccius	Bishop of Csanád; 1275–1293	Succeeded by Anthony
Political offices
Preceded by Thomas	Chancellor; 1289–1290	Succeeded by John Hont-Pázmány
