= Briccius (bishop of Csanád) =

13th-century Hungarian Catholic bishop

- Bishop of Csanád
- Installed: 1259
- Term ended: 1275
- Predecessor: Bulcsú Lád
- Successor: Gregory

Personal details
- Died: January/April 1275
- Denomination: Catholic Church

Briccius (Hungarian: Bereck; died January/April 1275) was a Hungarian Catholic prelate in the 13th century, who served as Bishop of Csanád at least from 1259 until his death.

== Career ==
The origins and early ecclesiastical career of Briccius (also Bryccius or Brictius) are unknown. He is first referred to as Bishop of Csanád in 1259; since his last known predecessor Bulcsú Lád is last mentioned in this capacity in 1254, thus Briccius elevated into the position sometime in the period between the two years.

Briccius' episcopal term coincided with the domain of younger king Stephen, who ruled the eastern counties – including the territory of the Diocese of Csanád – de facto independent of his father, King Béla IV of Hungary. Their tense relationship turned into a civil war by the middle of 1260s. Within the diocese, numerous clergymen supported Stephen's efforts, including provosts John and, initially, Benedict, but Briccius' affiliation is unknown. The name of Bishop Briccius occurs ("+ BRITIVS – EPIS...OP") on a single 13th century imitation of Friesacher pfennigs minted in Hungary. According to numismatist Márton Gyöngyössy, the coin – can be dated to 1259 or 1260 – was minted by Briccius of Csanád presumably at Szeged. Formerly, Austrian numismatist Bernhard Koch connected the coin to Briccius, the bishop of Vác (1221–1236).

He is last mentioned as a living person on 29 January 1275. The Diocese of Csanád was already in the status of sede vacante by 3 April 1275. His successor Gregory was elected by 30 May 1275.

== Sources ==
- Gyöngyössy, Márton (2013). "Bereck püspök dénárja. A váci vagy a szegedi középkori pénzverés emléke? [The Denarius of Bishop Briccius. A Clue to the Medieval Episcopal Coinage at Vác or at Szeged?]". Az Érem (in Hungarian). 69 (2). Magyar Éremgyűjtők Egyesülete: 1–5. ISSN 0133-8005.
- Juhász, Kálmán (1933). A csanádi püspökség története (1243–1307) [The History of the Diocese of Csanád (1243–1307)] (in Hungarian). Csanádvármegyei Könyvtár 24.
- Zsoldos, Attila (2011). Magyarország világi archontológiája, 1000–1301 [Secular Archontology of Hungary, 1000–1301] (in Hungarian). História, MTA Történettudományi Intézete. ISBN 978-963-9627-38-3.

Catholic Church titles
Preceded by Bulcsú Lád	Bishop of Csanád; 1259–1275	Succeeded by Gregory
