= Horka (title) =

9th and 10th century Magyar tribal title

Horka, or harka, was a title used by the Magyar tribes in the 9th and 10th centuries. According to Byzantine Emperor Constantine VII in De administrando imperio, the horka had judicial authority. However, in other sources, the term was applied to a military leader (such as Bulcsú, who led the Magyar forces at the Battle of Lechfeld). At some point in the 10th century, the roles of horka and gyula (the chief warlord) had become similar, with the horka holding authority in Western Transdanubia and the gyula in Transylvania in the east. In later sources, the word appears only as a personal name.

The title is somewhat similar to the term harki, which refers to a soldier in Arabic.

== Known office-holders ==
- Kál
- Bulcsú (fl. 948–955)
