= Badacsonytomaj =

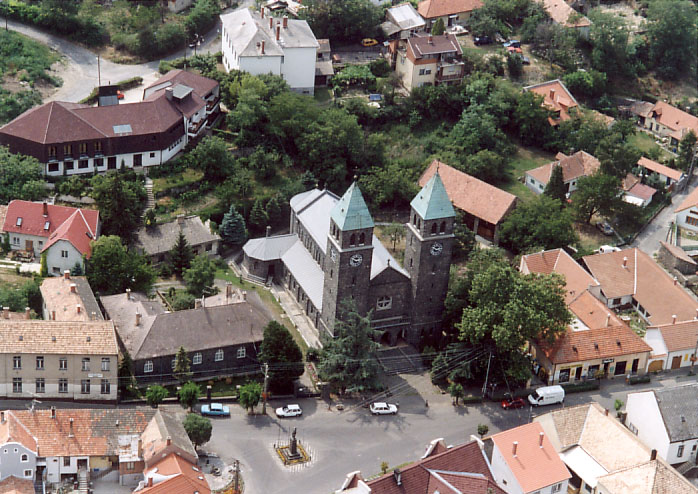

- Coat of arms

- Location of Veszprém county in Hungary

- Location of Badacsonytomaj
- Coordinates: 46.80908°N 17.50845°E
- Country: Hungary
- County: Veszprém

Area
  - Total: 32.71 km^{2} (12.63 sq mi)

Population (2017)
  - Total: 2,070
  - Density: 63.3/km^{2} (164/sq mi)
- Time zone: UTC+1 (CET)
  - Summer (DST): UTC+2 (CEST)
- Postal code: 8258
- Area code: 87

Badacsonytomaj (Hungarian pronunciation: [ˈbɒdɒt͡ʃoɲtomɒj]) is a town in the Hungarian county of Veszprém with 2,341 inhabitants, as of 2011. It is at the eastern foot of the volcanic Badacsony hill along the Lake Balaton in Hungary.

The greatest sight in the town is that of the hill itself, with its spectacular 60–70 m high basalt organs. The region around the town is well known for its high quality Hungarian wines.

The town's name was recently used in a viral promotion by Sony to promote a new feature in their PlayStation 3 Home Service. The viral campaign consisted of billboards being placed around Europe with various letters on them. Players had to piece together the letters and use the resulting word as a code.

As a municipality it includes the smaller villages of Badacsonyörs and Badacsony as well as the town center of Badacsonytomaj.

In the 19th and 20th centuries, a small Jewish community lived in the village, in 1910 56 Jews lived in the village, most of whom were murdered in the Holocaust. The community had a Jewish cemetery.

== Demography ==
Ethnic groups in the city of Badacsonytomaj
1. Hungarian (97.3%)
2. German (2.04%)
3. Unknown (0.63%)
4. Others (0.63%)
Religious groups in the village of Badacsonytomaj
1. Roman Catholic (55.1%)
2. No religion (6.19%)
3. Reformed (2.01%)
4. Lutheran (1.07%)
5. Unknown (34.8%)
6. Other (1.20%)

The majority ethnic group in the village is Hungarian (97.34%), followed by German (2.04%). The majority of residents are Roman Catholic (55.15%), 9% have no religion (6.19%). A significant number of residents' religions' are not known.
