= Dióskál =

Coordinates: 46°40′N 17°03′E

- Village
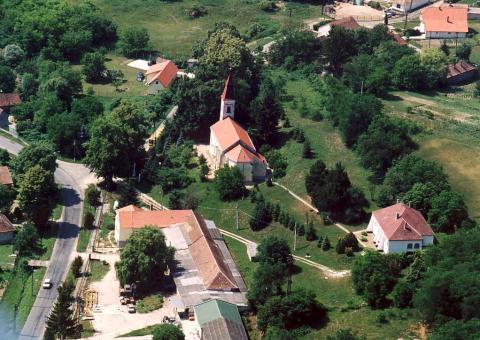
- Interactive map of Dióskál
- Country: Hungary
- Region: Western Transdanubia
- County: Zala
- District: Keszthely
- Time zone: UTC+1 (CET)
  - Summer (DST): UTC+2 (CEST)

Dióskál is a village in Keszthely District of Zala County in Hungary.
