= Köveskál =

- Location of Veszprém county in Hungary

- Location of Köveskál
- Coordinates: 46.88305°N 17.60520°E
- Country: Hungary
- County: Veszprém

Area
  - Total: 14.49 km^{2} (5.59 sq mi)

Population (2004)
  - Total: 440
  - Density: 30.36/km^{2} (78.6/sq mi)
- Time zone: UTC+1 (CET)
  - Summer (DST): UTC+2 (CEST)
- Postal code: 8274
- Area code: 87

Köveskál is a village in Veszprém county, Hungary.
