= Mindszentkálla =

- Location of Veszprém county in Hungary

- Location of Mindszentkálla
- Coordinates: 46.87505°N 17.55292°E
- Country: Hungary
- County: Veszprém

Area
  - Total: 10.84 km^{2} (4.19 sq mi)

Population (2025)
  - Total: 250
  - Density: 30.16/km^{2} (78.1/sq mi)
- Time zone: UTC+1 (CET)
  - Summer (DST): UTC+2 (CEST)
- Postal code: 8282
- Area code: 87
- Website: https://www.mindszentkalla.hu/

Mindszentkálla is a village in Veszprém county, Hungary, with a population of 250 (as of 2025). The ancient Eimann family has lived there since the beginning of the 18th century.
