= Balatonhenye =

- Location of Veszprém county in Hungary

- Location of Balatonhenye
- Coordinates: 46.91179°N 17.61307°E
- Country: Hungary
- County: Veszprém

Area
  - Total: 11.68 km^{2} (4.51 sq mi)

Population (2004)
  - Total: 151
  - Density: 12.92/km^{2} (33.5/sq mi)
- Time zone: UTC+1 (CET)
  - Summer (DST): UTC+2 (CEST)
- Postal code: 8275
- Area code: 87

Balatonhenye (Hungarian pronunciation: [ˈbɒlɒtonɦɛɲɛ]) is a village in Veszprém county, Hungary.
