= Badacsonytördemic =

- Flag Coat of arms

- Location of Badacsonytördemic in Hungary
- Coordinates: 46.81°N 17.4739°E
- Country: Hungary
- Region: Central Transdanubia
- County: Veszprém

Area
  - Total: 10.25 km^{2} (3.96 sq mi)

Population (2012)
  - Total: 820
  - Density: 80/km^{2} (210/sq mi)
- Time zone: UTC+1 (CET)
  - Summer (DST): UTC+2 (CEST)
- Postal code: 8263
- Area code: +36 87
- Website: https://badacsonytordemic.hu/

Badacsonytördemic (Hungarian pronunciation: [ˈbɒdɒt͡ʃoɲtørdɛmit͡s]) is a small village in Veszprém county, Hungary. Notable scenery in the region includes the Badacsony hill and the Balaton lake. It is one out of four Badacsony villages, and the least populous after Badacsonylábdihegy. In the village centre one can find two shops, (a co-op and a small independent shop) both selling basic items. There is also a doctor's surgery, a nursery and a church. On the Romai road one can find some apartments to stay in during the summer, and there is a small pub where one can find food, drinks, and ice cream. On the hill there is a car repair, and some wine cellars. At the edge of the village there is a small train station, Badacsonytördemic-Szigliget. Badacsonytördemic does not have a beach, as it's not actually on the shore, but both Szigliget and Badacsonylábdihegy beaches are nearby.
