= Badacsony =

Mountain in Hungary

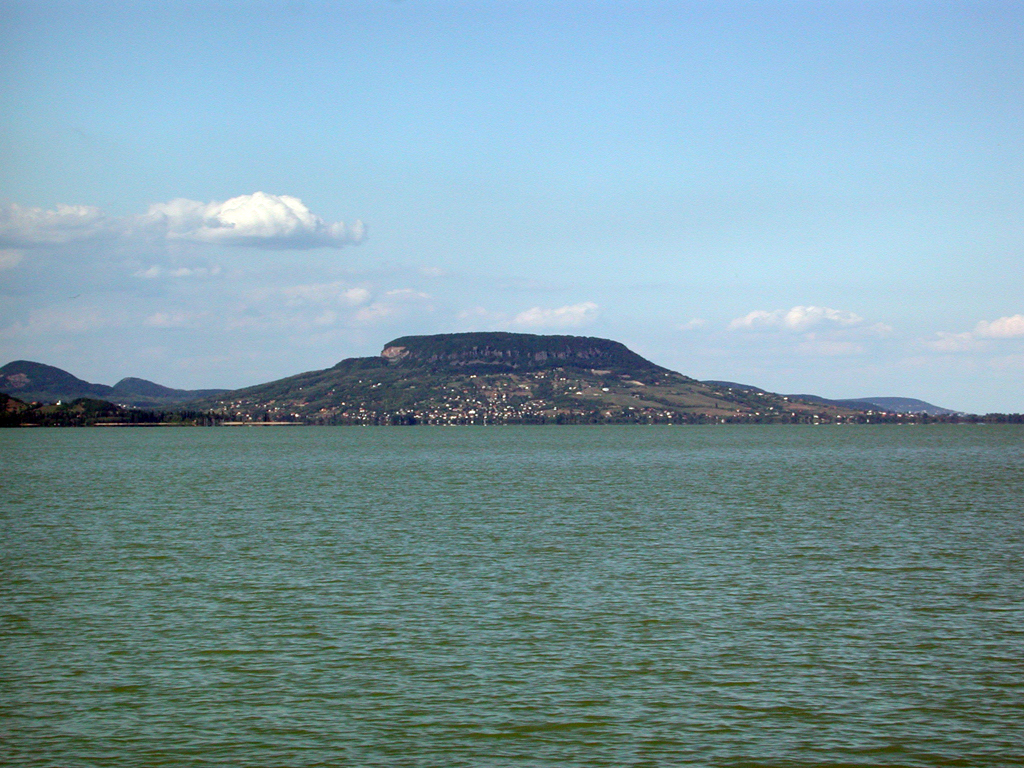

Highest point
- Elevation: 437.4 m (1,435 ft)
- Prominence: 300 m (984 ft)
- Coordinates: 46°48′12.64″N 17°29′45.01″E

Geography
- Location within Hungary
- Location: Hungary

Badacsony (Hungarian pronunciation: [ˈbɒdɒt͡ʃoɲ]) is the name of a region on the north shore of Lake Balaton in western Hungary, a mountain top and a town in that region.

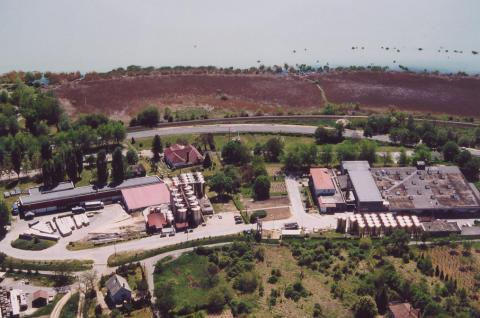
Aerial Photography: Badacsony Village

The nearby basalt mountains are unique geological relics, and the habitat of many rare plants and animals. These monadnocks are peculiarly shaped results of volcanic activity, formed before the period wherein Pannonia was an active geologic unit. Badacsony is the central part of the Badacsony wine region.

On the Badacsony mountain, poet Sándor Kisfaludy lived and first met his wife, Róza Szegedy. This event is commemorated by a small exhibition in a house on the mountain, the Róza Szegedy house, whilst the former house of Kisfaludy himself is now a restaurant.

Badacsony has a ferry landing with regular departures to Fonyód via a catamaran ferry the "Badacsony".

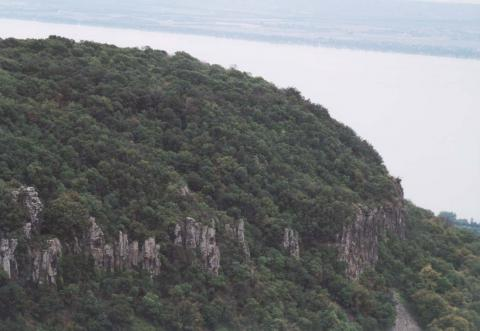
Mountain of Badacsony
