= Gyula (name) =

Hungarian male given name

- Gender: masculine
- Language: Hungarian
- Name day: April 12

Other gender
- Feminine: Júlia

Origin
- Language: Old Turkic
- Meaning: torch

Other names
- Nickname: Gyuszi
- Anglicisation: Julius

Gyula (Hungarian pronunciation: [ˈɟulɒ]) is a Hungarian male given name of presumably Turkic origin. Its meaning is 'torch'. It was revived in the 19th century when it was mistakenly identified with the Latin name Julius.

== History ==
Initially, it was a title within the Hungarian tribal alliance, but after establishing the Kingdom of Hungary, it evolved into a personal and placename. In the written sources from the end of the 10th century and the beginning of the 11th century, variations such as Giula, Geula, Gula, and Iula are already present. It became rare in the 16th century and almost disappeared. The name was revived during the 19th century when it was mistakenly believed to be derived from the Latin Julius. As a result, its female counterpart became Júlia. In 1823, István Széchenyi wrote: "Count Károly Andrássy and Countess Etelka Szápáry's son is the first Hungarian child in centuries to be baptized as Gyula."

== Etymology ==
The etymology of the name is disputed, however it is traditionally considered of Turkic origin. According to Lóránd Benkő, the word originates from Old Turkic, presumably from the Khazar language. Benkő assumed a *ǰula form derived from a Turkic word meaning 'torch.' Related words of Turkic origin can be found in the Hungarian language: gyúl (to catch fire, to be ignited) cf. West Old Turkic: *jul; East Old Turkic: *yul. András Róna-Tas and Árpád Berta also consider the latter to be a Turkic word. Dániel Németh suggested that the word may have Uralic origins. He derives it from the Finno-Ugric *ćȣlkɜ-, *ćȣ̈lkɜ- (shines, gleam, glitter) and the Ugric*čittɜ- (shine, illuminate) words. However, this theory was criticized by János B. Szabó and Balázs Sudár:

== As a settlement name ==
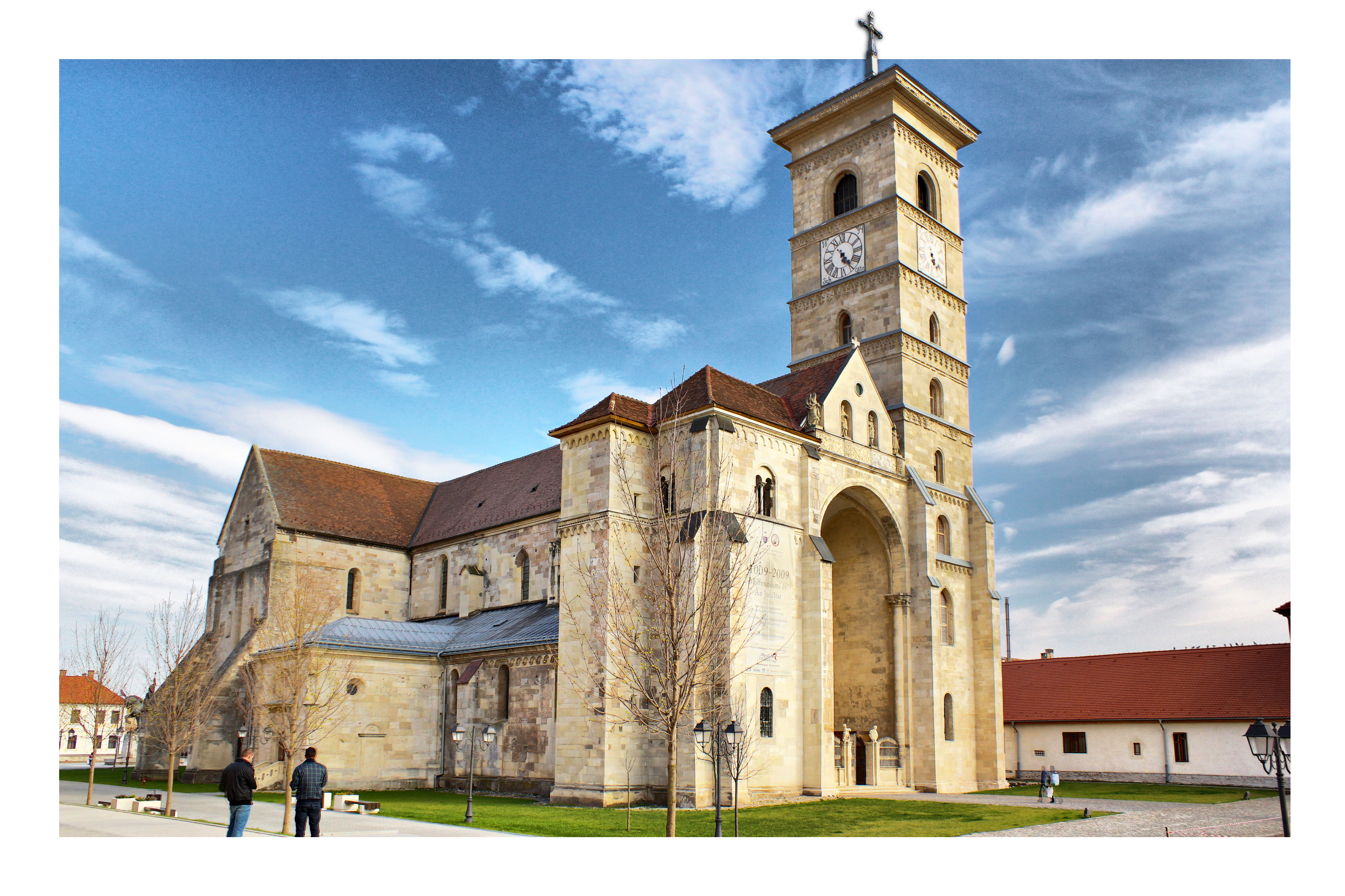
The Roman Catholic Cathedral in Alba Iulia (Gyulafehérvár), in the former capital of Transylvania, which city was named after Gyula II, a Hungarian tribal leader in the middle of the 10th century

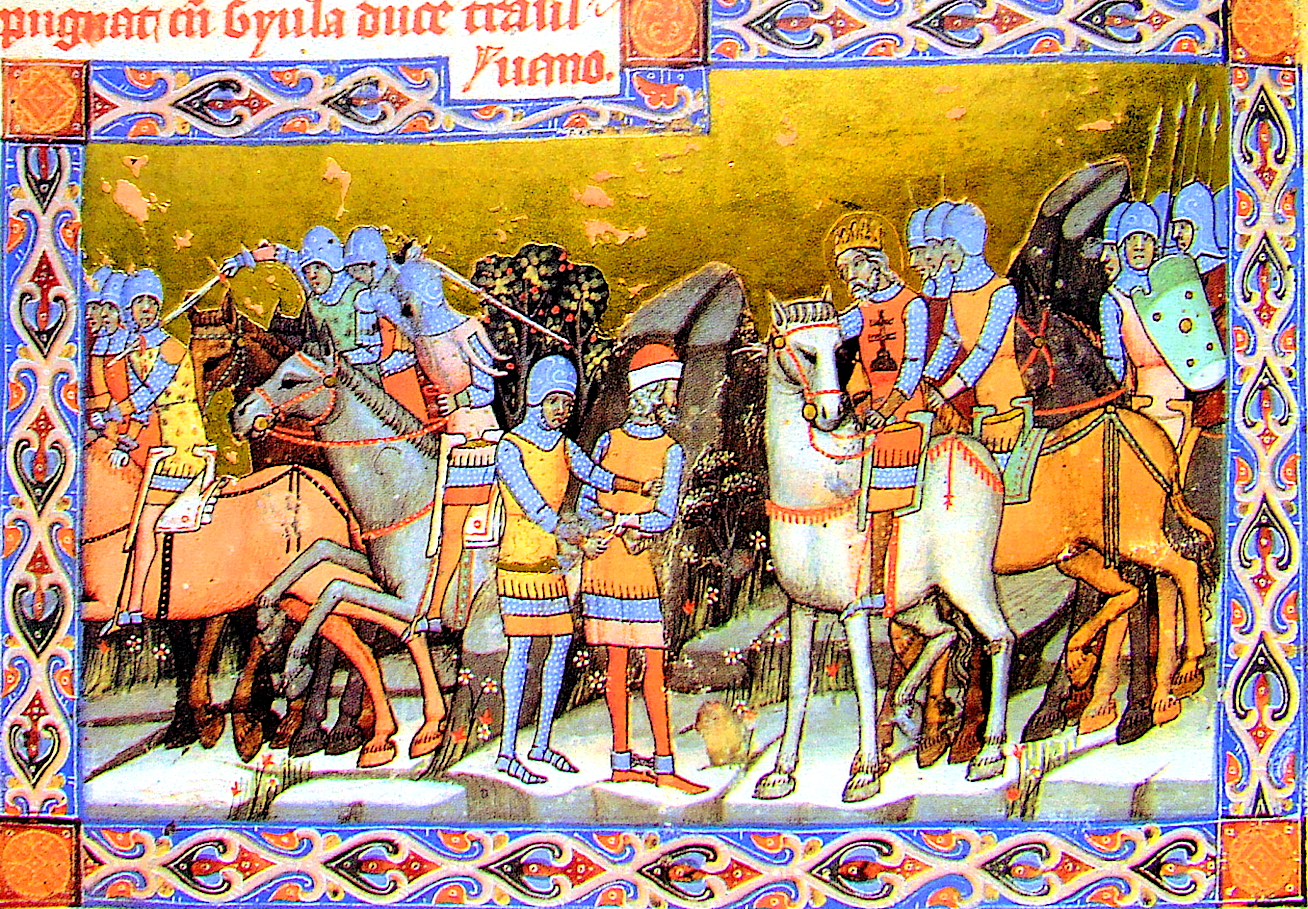
King Saint Stephen of Hungary captures his uncle Gyula III, the ruler of Transylvania (Chronicon Pictum, 1358)

The name often appears as a Hungarian toponym as well in the Carpathian Basin, in former territory of the Kingdom of Hungary.

- Gyula (Hungary)
- Gyula (Дюла, Ukraine)
- Gyulafehérvár (Alba Iulia, Romania)
- Gyulafirátót (Hungary)
- Gyulaháza (Hungary)
- Gyulaj (Hungary)
- Gyulakeszi (Hungary)
- Gyulakuta (Fântânele, Romania)
- Gyulamajor (Hungary)
- Gyulamajor (Ďulov Dvor, Slovakia)
- Gyulavári (Hungary)
- Gyulavarsánd (Vărșand, Romania)

== Notable persons ==
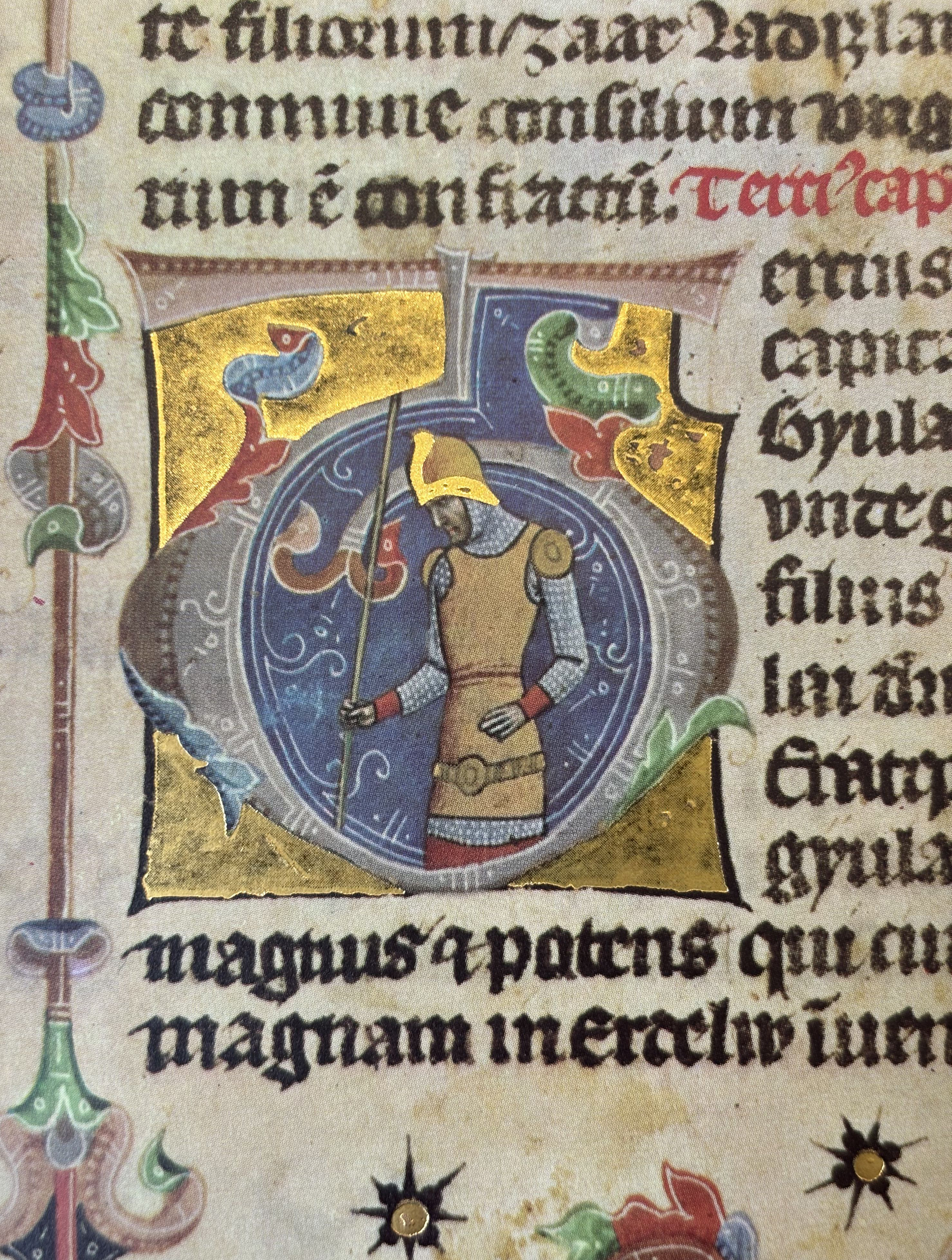
Gyula, third captain of the Hungarians during the Hungarian conquest of the Carpathian Basin, (Chronicon Pictum, 1358)

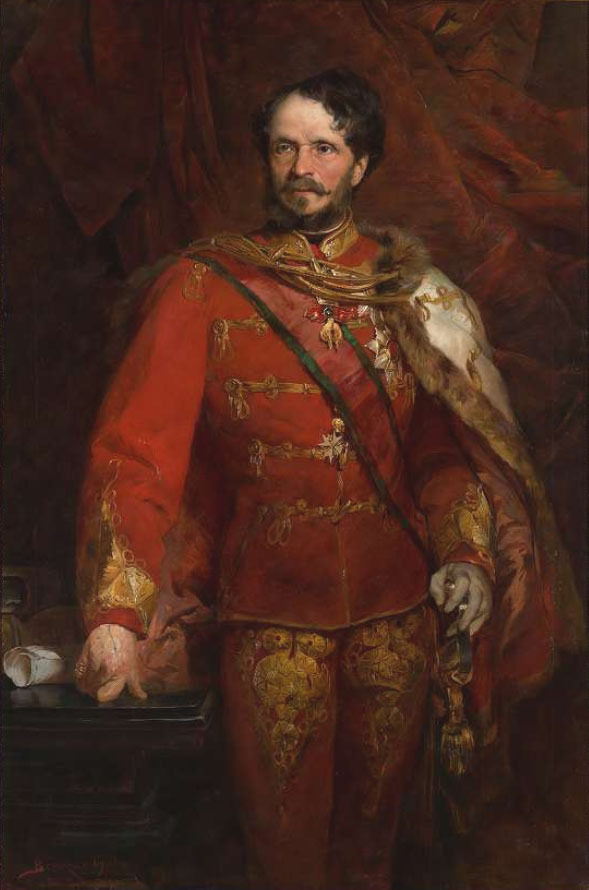
Gyula Andrássy Prime Minister of the Kingdom of Hungary (1867–1871) (painting by Gyula Benczúr in 1884)

- Gyula II
- Gyula III
- Gyula Aggházy (1850–1919), Hungarian genre painter and art teacher
- Gyula Andrássy (1823–1890), Hungarian statesman; Prime Minister of Hungary, Foreign Minister of Austria-Hungary
- Gyula Andrássy the Younger (1860–1929), Hungarian politician
- Gyula Babos (1949-2018), Hungarian jazz guitarist
- Gyula Bádonyi (1882–1944), Hungarian footballer
- Gyula Batthyány (1887-1959), Hungarian painter and graphic artist
- Gyula Benczúr (1844-1920), Hungarian artist
- Gyula Bíró (1890–1961), Hungarian Olympic football player
- Gyula Bóbis (1909–1972), Hungarian heavyweight wrestler
- Gyula Bodrogi (born 1934), Hungarian television and film actor
- Gyula Cseszneky (1914–1970), Hungarian aristocrat, poet, cavalry officer
- Gyula Csortos (1883–1945), Hungarian film and stage actor
- Gyula Derkovits (1894-1934) Hungarian painter and graphic artist
- Gyula Feldmann (1880—1955), Hungarian football player and coach
- Gyula Gál (born 1976), Hungarian handball player
- Gyula Germanus (1884–1979), Hungarian orientalist, politician, writer and academic
- Gyula Glykais (1893–1948), Hungarian fencer
- Gyula Gózon (1885–1972), Hungarian actor and comedian
- Gyula Gömbös (1886–1936), Hungarian military officer and politician, Prime Minister of Hungary
- Gyula Grosics (1926–2014), Hungarian footballer
- Gyula Horn (1932–2013), Hungarian politician; third Prime Minister of Hungary
- Gyula Horváth (born 1975), Hungarian footballer
- Gyula Illyés (1902–1983), Hungarian poet and novelist
- Gyula Kabos (1887–1941), Hungarian actor and comedian
- Gyula Kállai (1910–1996), Hungarian Communist politician
- Gyula Károlyi (1871–1947), Hungarian politician, Prime Minister of Hungary
- Gyula Katona (born 1941) Hungarian mathematician
- Gyula Kellner (1871–1940), Hungarian athlete
- Gyula Kertész (1888–1982), Hungarian footballer
- Gyula Koi (born 1977), Hungarian legal scholar and administrative lawyer
- Gyula Kőnig (1849–1913), Hungarian mathematician
- Gyula Kristó (1939–2004), Hungarian historian
- Gyula Krúdy (1878–1933), Hungarian writer and journalist
- Gyula László (1910–1998), Hungarian historian, archaeologist and artist
- Gyula Lóránt (1923–1981), Hungarian footballer and manager
- Gyula Mándi (1899–1969), Hungarian Olympic footballer and manager
- Gyula Moravcsik (1892–1972), Hungarian historian and byzantologist
- Gyula Németh (disambiguation), multiple people
- Gyula Ortutay (1910–1978), Hungarian ethnographer and politician
- Gyula Pados (born 1969), Hungarian cinematographer and director
- Gyula Pártos (1845–1916), Hungarian architect
- Gyula Sáringer (1928–2009), Hungarian agronomist and entomologist
- Gyula Szabó (1930–2014), Hungarian actor
- Gyula Szapáry (1832–1905), Hungarian politician, Prime Minister of Hungary
- Gyula Török (1938–2014), Hungarian boxer
- Gyula Vikidál (born 1948), Hungarian singer
- Gyula Wlassics (1852–1937), Hungarian politician
- Gyula Zsivótzky (1937–2007), Hungarian hammer thrower
- Gyula Grosz (1962), Hungarian Artist and Jewelry Designer

== See also ==
- Gyula (title)

== Sources ==
- Lóránd, Benkő (1967). A magyar nyelv történeti-etimológiai szótára (in Hungarian). Budapest: Akadémiai Kiadó.
- Lóránd, Benkő (1993). Etymologisches Wörterbuch des Ungarischen (in German). Vol. I. Budapest: Akadémiai Kiadó. ISBN 963 05 6227 8.
- Fercsik, Erzsébet; Rácz, Judit (2009). Keresztnevek enciklopédiája (PDF) (in Hungarian). Budapest: Tinta Könyvkiadó. ISBN 978 963 9902 18 3.
- Róna-Tas, András; Berta, Árpád (2011). West Old Turkic - Turkic Loanwords in Hungarian 1-2. Wiesbaden: Harrassowitz Verlag. ISBN 978 3 447 06260 2.
- Németh, Dániel (2023). "Régi és új etimológiák". Magyar Nyelv (in Hungarian). 119 (2). ISSN 1588-1210.

== See also ==
- Gyula (title)is a Hungarian title of the 9th to 10th centuries.
- Gyula II, the gyula who was baptized in Constantinople around 950.
- Gyula III, the gyula who was defeated by King Stephen I of Hungary around 1003.
