= Bogát =

Hungarian Gyula, General, and Prince of the Keszi Tribe

Bogát (Gyula I)

Gyula of the Hungarians (debated)
- Reign: fl. 920-922
- Predecessor: Kurszán (?)
- Successor: Gyula II
- Born: c. Late 9th Century; Principality of Hungary
- Died: Principality of Hungary
- Issue: Gyula II
- Father: Tétény

Bogát (Eng: Bogat) was a 10th century Hungarian General, according to Liudprand, Bogát was one of the leaders of the 921–922 Italian Campaign under the name Busak. According to László Makkai, he then became the first Gyula of Transylvania. Gyula Kristó explains the origin of his name from the Slavic word ("rich").

== Personal life ==
In 921–922, at the invitation of King Berengar I, Hungarian troops took part in the Italian civil wars. After 899–900, it was the second largest campaign in Italy. According to Liudprand, some Italian counts (Count Adalbert, Palatine- Count Odelrik, Count Gislebert and others) wanted to invite King Rudolph II of Burgundy to the Italian throne. The Hungarians, led by Dursak (Tarhacsi) and Bogat, rushed Berengar's unsuspecting opponents near Verona, killed Odelrik, and captured Adalbert and Gislebert. The Hungarians then made their way to southern Italy, and on February 4, 922, already under Byzantine authority, from Apulia.

Anonymus mistakenly calls him Bulcsú's father.

== Gyula of Transylvania ==
In his work Anonymus, he strongly mixed personal names and names of dignitaries (Gyula, Harka). from the time of the conquest. From a detailed analysis of place name data, it is likely that the first Gyula in Transylvania was the Bogát prince (Bugat rex), who, according to Liudprand Antapodosis, helped King Berengar I in 921 while accompanied by "Dursac rex" (probably Árpád's son Tarkacsu) with a Hungarian army. In this case, disentangling Anonymus' data, the order of inheritance emerges according to which the ancestor of the Transylvanian Gyulas is Harka Tétény and his son Harka Bogát, who was elevated to the dignity of Gyula when he moved from the western part of the Carpathian Basin to Transylvania around 921, and his son was Gyula Zombor, the ancestor of the Zsombor family.

== Sources ==
- Köpeczi, Béla (1986). Erdély története. Illustrated by Balatoni János, Csonka Sándor, Kiss E. Csaba, Palovics Lajos, Váliné Pogány Jolán. Budapest: Akadémiai Kiadó. ISBN 963-05-4203-X. OCLC 15550639.
- Liudprand: Liudprand: Antapodosis. magyarzenetortenet.hu (in Hungarian) (Hozzáférés: 2020. okt. 13.) arch
- Köpeczi, Béla (2001). History of Transylvania. Boulder, Colo.: Social Science Monographs. ISBN 0-88033-479-7. OCLC 49394338.
- Engel, Pál (2001). The realm of St. Stephen: a history of medieval Hungary, 895-1526. London: I.B. Tauris. ISBN 1-86064-061-3. OCLC 46570146.
