= List of Romania county name etymologies =

Many of the etymologies of Romanian counties are Romanian interpretations of Slavonic names (e.g.: Gorj and Dolj), as the administration documents in the Middle Ages Romanian Principalities (Wallachia and Moldavia) were written in this language.

| County name | Language of origin | Meaning |
|---|---|---|
| Alba | Latin | Named after the city of Alba-Iulia ("The white city of Julius/(the) Gyula; in Hungarian Gyulafehérvár, "White castle of (the) Gyula; also Bălgrad, "White city" in several Slavic languages), probably from the white colour of the city walls. |
| Arad | Hungarian | Named after the city of Arad, formerly Urod (11th century) after the name of a Hungarian knight, probably from the root ur meaning lord, meaning a place, which belongs to your (-od/today:ad) lord (úr). |
| Argeș | Dacian | Named after the Argeș River, in ancient times Argessos, probably meaning "shiny". |
| Bacău | Hungarian or Slavic or Cuman/Pecheneg (Turkic) or Latin | Named after the city of Bacău, in medieval times known as Bacovia in Latin, possibly meaning "the road of Bachus". The area was an important source of wine for the Romans. Alternatively Bakovia or Bakova derives from a person name Bako, found in Transylvania and as well in Bulgaria. The name is considered Hungarian or a derivation from Proto-Slavic byk (meaning "ox" or "bull"), or of Cuman/Pecheneg origin. The region was very suitable for raising cattle. |
| Bihor | Hungarian, Slavic | The county's name is the Romanian equivalent of the former Bihar County, which originates from the city of Bihar. The Hungarian Bihar derived from the word vihar (tempest, storm), that is of Slavic origin; vihor (whirlwind). |
| Bistrița-Năsăud | Slavic and Hungarian or German | Named after Bistrița (Slavic, "rapid"), a city and river and the city of Năsăud (Hungarian Naszód, German Nussdorf, "walnut tree village"). It may be also possible it derived from a person name, documented in 1269 as Naswod (current Nesvady). |
| Botoșani | Romanian (Mongolian) | Several possible origins: botoș (tick), botos (big-mouthed), botoșei (booties) and where Batu Khan split a part of his armies, invading what is now the northern Balkans, Hungary, Austria and Bohemia. "Batu", also pronounced "Botu", means "firm" in the Mongolian language. |
| Brașov | Uncertain, possibly Slavic | Possibly from baras, fortress. |
| Brăila | Turkish | Turkish origin from the proper name "Ibrail". Among the earlier names are Ibraila, Brilago, Uebereyl, Brailov. |
| București | Romanian | From Bucur, personal name meaning "joyful", cognate with Albanian bukur (beautiful) |
| Buzău | Greek | Greek origin from Μουσαίος (Mousaios), the original name of the city of Buzău. |
| Caraș-Severin | Turkish and Slavic | Named after the Caraș River (Turkish Kara, "dark, black") and Turnu Severin (Romanian, "Northern Tower": turn is borrowed from German Türm, "tower"; severin is a Slavic word meaning "Northern"). |
| Călărași | Romanian (Latin) | From călăraș, Historical term for "horseman" (military or courier). The word derives out of Romanian călare (riding), itself from cal (horse), Romanian cognate of Latin caballus. |
| Cluj | Hungarian, German or Latin | From the first part of Cluj-Napoca, deriving either from German Klause, "Mountain pass", Latin clusium, "enclosing", referring to the surrounding hills, or Hungarian Kolos, Miklós, after the first castellan of the local castle. |
| Constanța | Latin | Named after Constanța. The city, originally called Tomis, was renamed Constantiana by the Byzantine Emperor Constantine, in honor of his sister, Flavia Julia Constantia. |
| Covasna | Slavic | From Slavickvasny квасны, "soured, fermented", referring to the mineral waters of the region, with bubbles like beer and other fermented drinks. |
| Dâmbovița | Slavic | Named after the Dâmbovița River, from Дъб, dămb, meaning "oak" |
| Dolj | Slavic | From Dolu Jiu, the Jiu of the valley. The Jiu river flows through the county. |
| Galați | Cuman (Turkic) | From gala(t), borrowed to Turkish kala (fortress) (also, an unsourced speculation, ascribe the origin to a certain Galatian Celtic tribe) |
| Giurgiu | Unknown, possibly Italian | Possibly from Rossy vel Jargo, Jurcova or Zorio. (see external link). Possibly named after Giurgiu as the Genoese in the 14th century named it after San Giorgio, the patron of their city. |
| Gorj | Slavic | From Gora Jiu, "Jiu of the mountains". The Jiu river flows through the county. |
| Harghita | Uncertain | Possibly related to "Argeș" (Argessos), but the peculiar phonetic form indicates that there was an unknown intermediary language that was not Romanian, Hungarian or Slavic, possibly some form of Sarmatian or Scythian. |
| Hunedoara | Hungarian | "Hunedoara" is the transliteration of the Hungarian name "Hunyadvár" meaning "Castle of Hunyad." From Proto-Uralic *kuńa- (“to close eyes, blink”). |
| Ialomița | Slavic | Named after the Ialomița river, formerly known as Ialovnița, from Slavic jalov, "barren" |
| Iași | Possibly Sarmatian | Named after the Sarmatian Iazygi which lived in the 1st century. However, this does not explain the existence of other localities called Iași throughout Romania. |
| Ilfov | Slavic | Named after the Ilfov River, from Slavic "Elhovo" meaning "Alder" (Alnus glutinosa). |
| Maramureș | Indo-European | It originates from the Mara river which name is possibly derives from the Indo-European Mori (sea, still water) and Mors (dead). |
| Mehedinți | Romanian (Latin) | From the town of Mehadia, possibly be derived from the ancient Latin name of the colony: Ad mediam ("in the middle"). Mehedinți might also come from Mehadianți, as -ianțiu/-ianțu is a common ending for family names in the area. |
| Mureș | Latin | Named after the Mureș river, in Latin Maris ("murky"). |
| Neamț | Romanian (Slavic) | Named after Piatra Neamț, neamț means "German" (from Slavic nemeti). The Teutons built a fortress there to protect the Bicaz Pass, which leads to Transylvania |
| Olt | Dacian or unknown | Named after the Olt river, known to the Dacians as Alutus (etymology unknown). Contemporarily it has been also described as Alouta (Aλoύτα) and Aloutaz (Aλoύταζ). The initial "o" could indicate a Slavic intermediary. |
| Prahova | Slavic | Named after the Prahova river. Prahova derives either from prag ("water cataract") or prah ("dust"). |
| Satu Mare | Hungarian/Romanian | Named after the city of Satu Mare. Satu Mare means "Big village" in Romanian. However, the actual name derives from the Hungarian name Szatmár, itself possibly derived from the personal name Zotmar. Originally called by Romanians as Sătmar, it later it has been officially changed to Satu Mare and the meaning of "big village" came about through folk etymology as it coincidentally sounded similar to these Romanian words. Besides all of these, some suggest that the original root may have come from the German Salzmarkt. |
| Sălaj | Hungarian | Named after the Sălaj River, from Hungarian Szilágy "elm creek", composed from szil, "elm" and ágy "riverbed". |
| Sibiu | Slavic | Slavic: from sviba, "horn". Latin: from Cibinum, the name of the town of Sibiu as mentioned in 1191 - ultimately derived from the name of the river Cibin that passes through the town. |
| Suceava | Hungarian | From Szűcsvár, "Town of the skin-workers", from szűcs, "fourrier" and vár, "city". |
| Teleorman | Cuman (Turkic) | From deli orman "thick forest" (lit. "mad forest"). |
| Timiș | Possibly Latin | After the Timiș River, known to the Romans as Tibisis or Tibiscus, of uncertain etymology. |
| Tulcea | Uncertain, possibly Tatar | Named after the city of Tulcea. Meaning unknown. -cea is a common Turkish ending. There is a town with a similar name (Tulchin) in Southern Ukraine, reinforcing the Tatar hypothesis. |
| Vaslui | Cuman (Turkic) | Named after the Vaslui River, which shows a typical Cuman ending for hydronyms: -ui, "water". |
| Vâlcea | Romanian/Slavic | Romanian for "little valley", from vale, "valley" (Latin vallis). Also possibly from vlk ("wolf"), the name of a Dark Age Slavic warlord mentioned in Hungarian chronicles. |
| Vrancea | Slavic | Ultimately from vrana, "raven". |

== Historical counties ==
| County name | Language of origin | Meaning |
|---|---|---|
| Bălți | Romanian | "ponds" |
| Caliacra | Greek | From "καλός" ("beautiful") and "άκρα" ("headland" or "edge" or "extremity") |
| Covurlui | Cuman | From kurgu, "dry" + suffix -ui, "water" |
| Cetatea Albă | Romanian (Latin) | "White fortress" |
| Câmpulung | Romanian (Latin) | "long plain" |
| Durostor | Greek | From the Roman name of Silistra, Durostorum, ultimately from the Ancient Greek Δουρόστορον (Douróstoron). |
| Odorhei | Hungarian | First part of Odorheiu Secuiesc, from Székelyudvarhely, "Market-town of the Székely" |
| Muscel | Romanian (Dacian?) | "hillock" |
| Soroca | Slavic | "magpie" |
| Vlașca | Slavic (ultimately Germanic) | "land of the Vlachs" (see Vlachs#Etymology) |

== See also ==
- Counties of Romania
