= Principality of Hungary =

State in Central Europe (c. 895–1000)

Grand Principality of Hungary Magyar Nagyfejedelemség (Hungarian)
- c. 895–1000; Árpád dynasty
- Top: Magyar banner of the Conquest Era; Bottom: Banner of the Árpád dynasty Attributed Turul coat of arms from the Chronicon Pictum (c. 1370) Arms of the Árpád dynasty

- Principality of Hungary (c. 1000)
- Status: Principality
- Capital: Esztergom and Székesfehérvár (from the reigns of Taksony and Géza)
- Religion: Hungarian paganism; Slavic paganism; Tengrism; Chalcedonian Christianity
- Demonym: Hungarian
- Government: Gyula–Kende sacred diarchy (early); Tribal confederation
- Kende
  - 890s – c. 904: Kurszán
- Grand Prince
  - c. 895 – c. 907: Árpád
  - c. 907 – c. 950: Zoltán
  - c. 950 – c. 955: Fajsz
  - c. 955 – c. 972: Taksony
  - c. 972 – 997: Géza
  - 997–1000: Stephen
- Historical era: Middle Ages
  - Established: c. 895
  - Hungarian invasions of Europe: 839–970
  - Battle of Pressburg: 4–6 July 907
  - Battle of Lechfeld: 10–12 August 955
  - Koppány's revolt: 997
  - Coronation of Stephen I: 25 December 1000 or 1 January 1001
Preceded by
Etelköz
Great Moravia
Principality of Lower Pannonia
First Bulgarian Empire
Huns
Avar Khaganate
Succeeded by
Kingdom of Hungary

The Grand Principality of Hungary or Duchy of Hungary (Hungarian: Magyar Nagyfejedelemség: "Hungarian Grand Principality", Byzantine Greek: Τουρκία (Tourkia)) was the earliest documented Hungarian state in the Carpathian Basin, established around 895, following the 9th century Magyar invasion of the Carpathian Basin. The Hungarians took possession of the Carpathian Basin in a pre-planned manner, with a long move-in between 862–895.

The Hungarians, a semi-nomadic people, formed a tribal alliance led by Árpád (founder of the Árpád dynasty) who arrived from Etelköz, their earlier principality east of the Carpathians.

During the period, the power of the Hungarian Grand Prince seemed to be decreasing irrespective of the success of the Hungarian military raids across Europe. The tribal territories, ruled by Hungarian warlords (chieftains), became semi-independent polities (e.g., the domains of Gyula the Younger in Transylvania). These territories were united again only under the rule of St. Stephen. The semi-nomadic Hungarian population adopted settled life. The chiefdom society changed to a state society. From the second half of the 10th century, Christianity started to spread. The principality was succeeded by the Christian Kingdom of Hungary with the coronation of St Stephen I at Esztergom on Christmas Day 1000 (its alternative date is 1 January 1001).

The period from 895 to 1000 is called "the age of principality" within Hungarian historiography.

== Etymology ==
The ethnonym of the Hungarian tribal alliance is uncertain. According to one view, following the description in the 13th century chronicle, Gesta Hungarorum, the federation was called "Hetumoger / Seven Magyars" ("VII principales persone qui Hetumoger dicuntur", "seven princely persons who are called Seven Magyars"), though the word "Magyar" possibly comes from the name of the most prominent Hungarian tribe, called Megyer. The tribal name "Megyer" became "Magyar" referring to the Hungarian people as a whole. Written sources called Magyars as "Hungarians" prior to their invasion of the Carpathian Basin when they still lived on the steppes of Eastern Europe (in 837 "Ungri" mentioned by Georgius Monachus, in 862 "Ungri" by Annales Bertiniani, in 881 "Ungari" by the Annales ex Annalibus Iuvavensibus).

In contemporary Byzantine sources, written in Greek, the country was known as "Western Tourkia" in contrast to Eastern (Khazar) Tourkia. The Jewish Hasdai ibn Shaprut around 960 called the polity "the land of the Hungrin" (the land of the Hungarians) in a letter to Joseph of the Khazars.

== History ==
=== Background ===
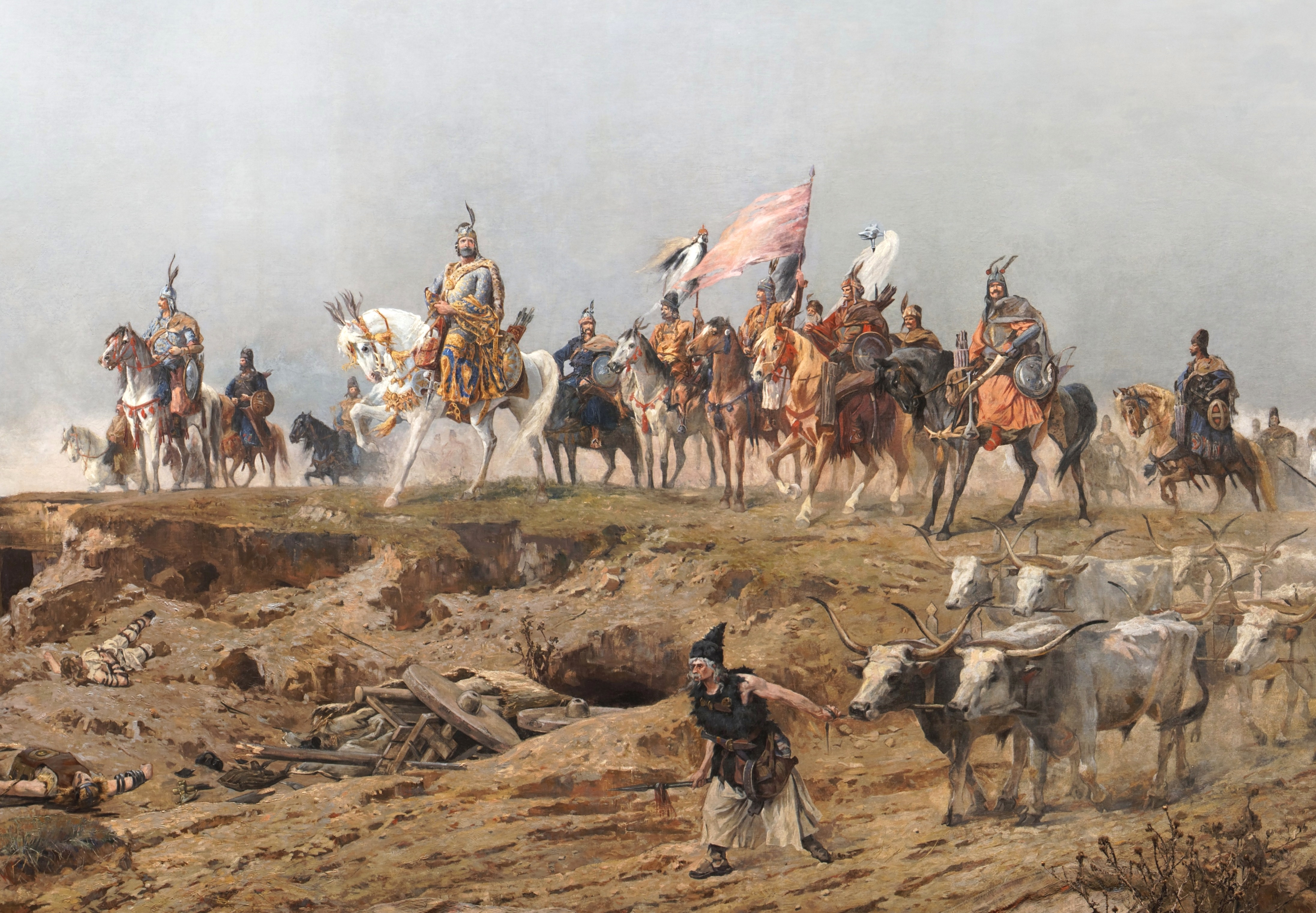
A detail of the Arrival of the Hungarians, Árpád Feszty's and his assistants' vast (1800 m^{2}) cyclorama, painted to celebrate the 1000th anniversary of the Magyar invasion of Hungary, now displayed at the Ópusztaszer National Heritage Park in Hungary

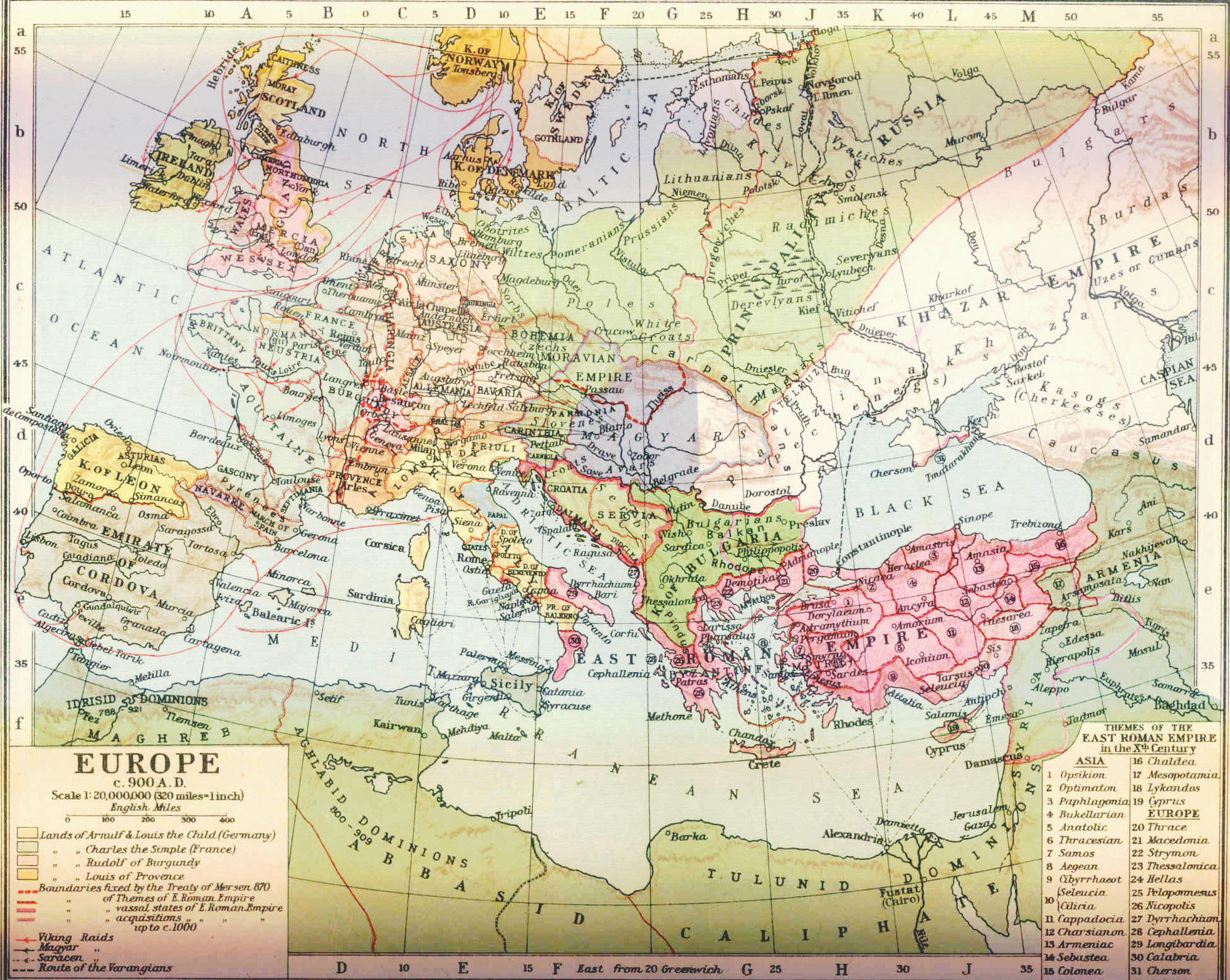
Europe around 900

On the eve of the arrival of the Hungarians (Magyars), around 895, East Francia, the First Bulgarian Empire and Great Moravia ruled the territory of the Carpathian Basin. The Hungarians had much knowledge about this region because they were frequently hired as mercenaries by the surrounding polities and had led their own campaigns in this area for decades. This area had been sparsely populated since Charlemagne's destruction of the Avar state in 803, and the Magyars were able to move in peacefully and virtually unopposed during the 9th century. The first mention of them living in the region dates back to 862. The conquest proper started from 894, when armed conflicts opened with the Bulgarians and Moravians after the requests for help from Arnulf, Frankish king and Leo VI, Byzantine emperor. During the occupation, the Hungarians found sparse population and met no well-established states or effective control of any empire in the plain. They were able to take over the basin quickly, defeating the First Bulgarian Tsardom, disintegrating the Principality of Moravia, and firmly establishing their state there by 900. The invasion was not aimed at plundering the acquired lands as attacks were led by gyula Árpád and kende Kurszán, the two highest-ranking leaders, who left no mass graves behind them showing that the transition back to an Avar-like system was peaceful for the locals. Archaeological findings indicate that they settled in the lands near the Sava and Nyitra by this time.

=== Military achievements ===
The principality as a warrior state, with a new-found military might, conducted vigorous raids ranging widely from Constantinople to central Spain. Three major Frankish imperial armies were defeated decisively by the Hungarians between 907 and 910. The Hungarians succeeded in extending the de jure Bavarian-Hungarian border to the River Enns (until 955), after the Battle of Pressburg in 907, a western army did not attack Hungary for more than 100 years until 1030. The intermittent Hungarian campaigns lasted until 970, but two military defeats in 955 (Lechfeld) and 970 (Arcadiopolis) marked a shift in the evolution of the Hungarian principality.

=== Transition ===
The change from a ranked chiefdom society to a state society was one of the most important developments during this time. Initially, the Magyars retained a semi-nomadic lifestyle, practising transhumance: they would migrate along a river between winter and summer pastures, finding water for their livestock. According to Györffy's theory derived from placenames, Árpád's winter quarters -clearly after his occupation of Pannonia in 900- were possibly in 'Árpádváros' (Árpád's town), now a district of Pécs, and his summer quarters -as confirmed by Anonymus- were on Csepel Island. Later, his new summer quarters were in Csallóköz according to this theory, however the exact location of the early center of the state is disputed. According to Gyula Kristó the center was located between the Danube and Tisza rivers, but the archaeological findings imply a location in the region of the Upper Tisza.

Constantine VII's De Administrando Imperio, written around 950 AD, tries to define precisely the whole land of the Hungarians, or Tourkia. Constantine described the previous inhabitants of Hungary (e.g., the Moravians), described early Hungarian settlements and neighbors, and located Hungarian rivers (Temes, Maros, Körös, Tisza, Tutisz). Constantine had much more knowledge about the eastern parts of Hungary; therefore, according to one theory, Tourkia did not mean the land of the whole federation, but a tribal settlement and the source of the description of Hungary could have been Gyula whose tribe populated the five rivers around 950. According to another hypothesis, mainly based on Constantine's description, the Hungarians started to really settle western Hungary (Transdanubia) only after 950, because the eastern part of the country was more suitable for a nomadic lifestyle.

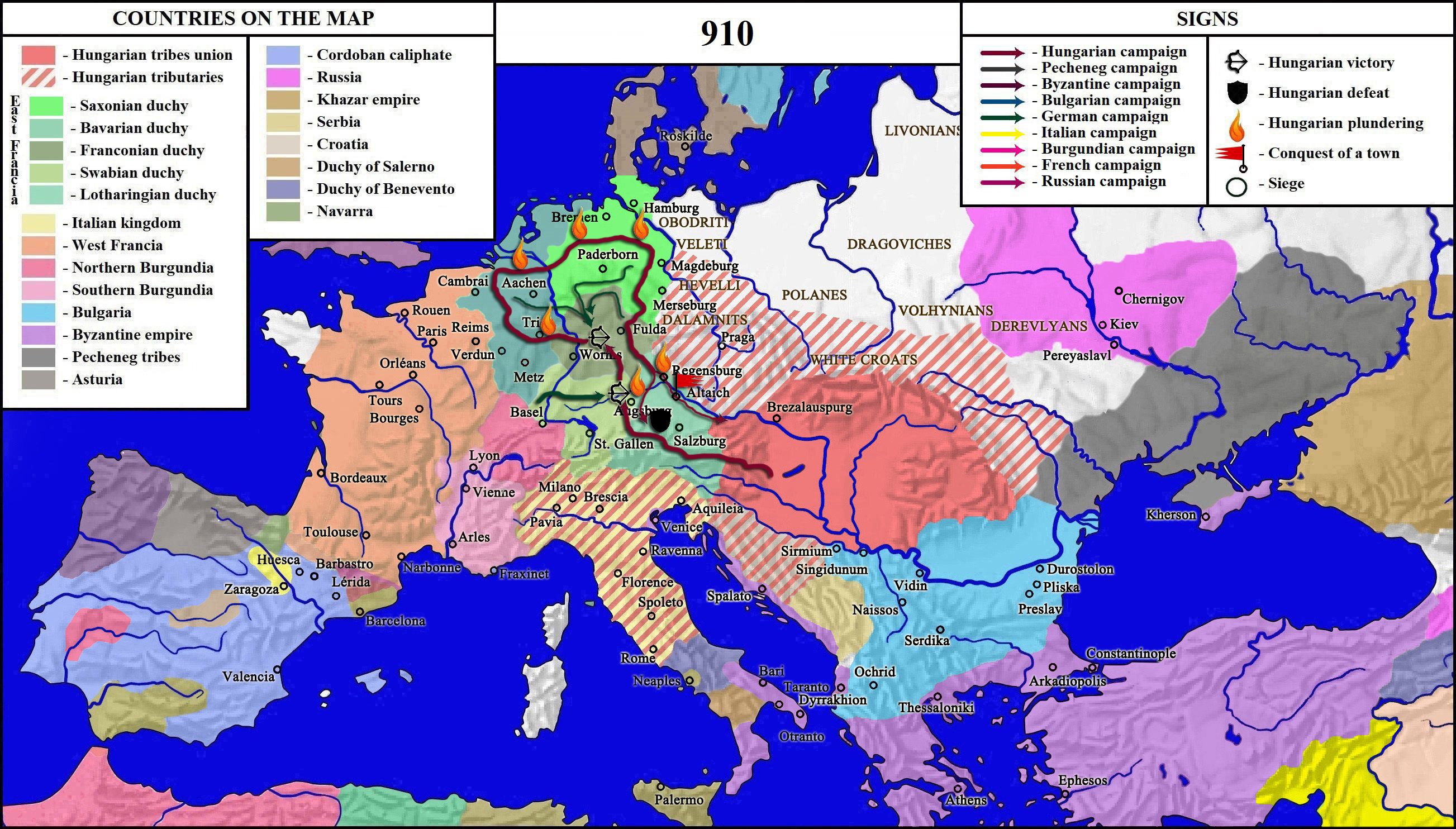
The Hungarian campaign in the East Frankish duchies of 910

Due to changed economic circumstances, insufficient pasturage to support a nomadic society and the impossibility of moving on, the semi-nomadic Hungarian lifestyle began to change and the Magyars adopted a settled life and turned to agriculture, though the start of this change can be dated to the 8th century. The society became more homogeneous: the local Slavic and other populations merged with the Hungarians. The Hungarian tribal leaders and their clans established fortified centers in the country and later their castles became centers of the counties. The whole system of Hungarian villages developed in the 10th century.

Fajsz and Taksony, the Grand Princes of the Hungarians, began to reform the power structure. They invited Christian missionaries for the first time and built forts. Taksony abolished the old center of the Hungarian principality (possibly at Upper Tisza) and sought new ones at Székesfehérvár and Esztergom. Taksony also reintroduced the old style military service, changed the weaponry of the army, and implemented large-scale organized resettlements of the Hungarian population.

The consolidation of the Hungarian state began during the reign of Géza. After the battle of Arcadiopolis, the Byzantine Empire was the main enemy of the Hungarians. The Byzantine expansion threatened the Hungarians, since the subjugated First Bulgarian Empire was allied with the Magyars at that time. The situation became more difficult for the principality when the Byzantine Empire and the Holy Roman Empire made an alliance in 972. In 973, twelve illustrious Magyar envoys, whom Géza had probably appointed, participated in the Diet held by Otto I, Holy Roman Emperor. Géza established close ties with the Bavarian court, inviting missionaries and marrying his son to Gisela, daughter of Duke Henry II. Géza of the Árpád dynasty, Grand Prince of the Hungarians, who ruled only part of the united territory, the nominal overlord of all seven Magyar tribes, intended to integrate Hungary into Christian Western Europe, rebuilding the state according to the Western political and social model. Géza's eldest son St Stephen (István, Stephen I of Hungary) became the first King of Hungary after defeating his uncle Koppány, who also claimed the throne. The unification of Hungary, the foundation of the Christian state and its transformation into a European feudal monarchy was accomplished by Stephen.

=== Christianization ===
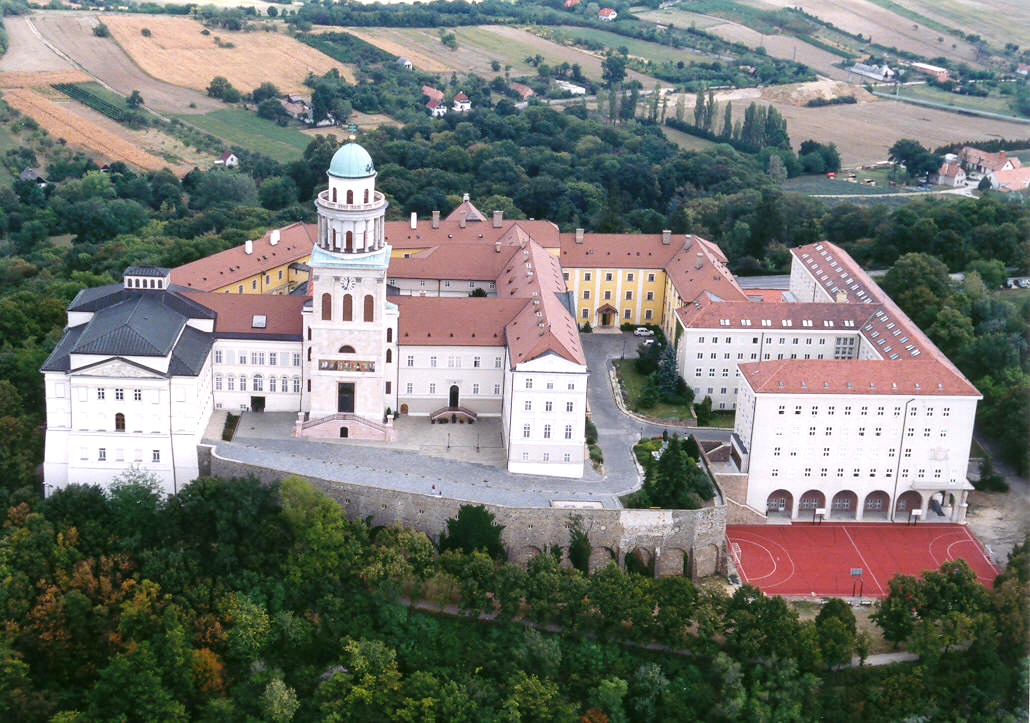
The first Hungarian Benedictine monastery in Pannonhalma, founded by Prince Géza in 996

The new Hungarian state was located on the border with Christendom. Since the second half of the 10th century AD, Christianity was flourished in Hungary as the German Catholic missionaries arrived from East Francia. Between 945 and 963, the main office-holders of the Principality (the gyula and the horka) agreed to convert to Christianity. In 973 Géza I and all his household were baptised, and a formal peace concluded with the Holy Roman Emperor Otto I; however he remained essentially pagan even after his baptism: Géza had been educated by his father Taksony as a pagan prince. The first Hungarian Benedictine monastery was founded in 996 by Prince Géza. During Géza's reign, the nation conclusively renounced its nomadic way of life and within a few decades of the Battle of Lechfeld became a Christian kingdom.

== Organization of the state ==
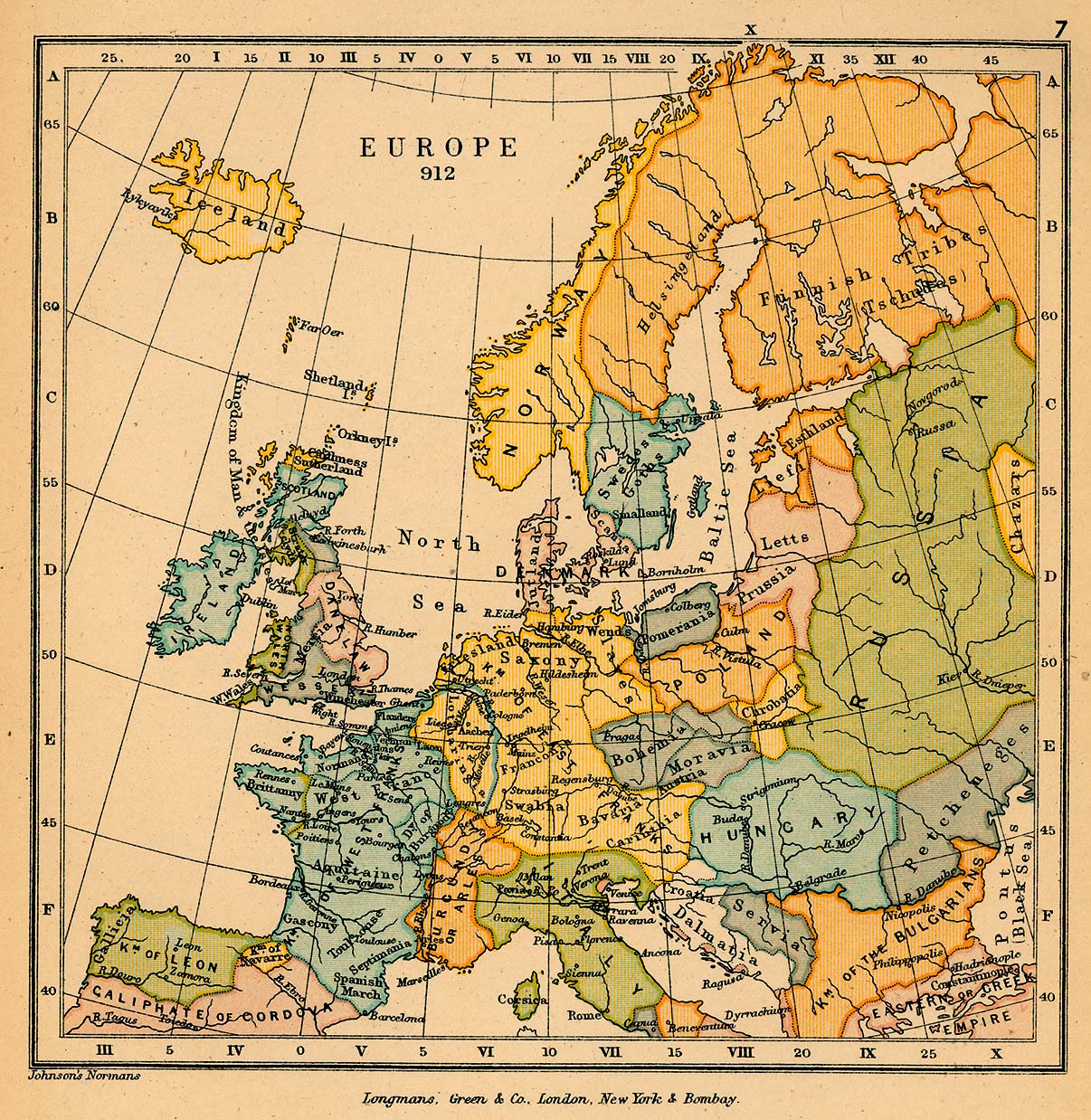
Europe in 912

Until 907 (or 904), the Hungarian state was under joint rule (perhaps adopted from the Khazars). The kingship had been divided between the sacral king (some sources report the titles "prince" or "khan"), or Kende, and the military leader, or gyula. It is not known which of the two roles were assigned to Árpád and which to Kurszán. Possibly, after the Kende Kurszán's death, this division ceased and Árpád became the sole ruler of the principality. The Byzantine Constantine Porphyrogennetos called Árpád "ho megas Tourkias archon" (the great prince of Tourkia), and all of the 10th-century princes who ruled the country held this title. According to the Agnatic seniority the oldest members of the ruling clan inherited the principality. The Grand Princes of Hungary probably did not hold superior power, because during the military campaigns to the west and to the south the initially strong princely power had decreased. Moreover, the records do not refer to Grand Princes in the first half of the 10th century, except in one case, where they mention Taksony as 'duke of Hungary' (Taxis-dux, dux Tocsun) in 947. The role of military leaders (Bulcsú, Lél) grew more significant. The princes of the Árpád dynasty bore Turkic names as did the majority of the Hungarian tribes.

=== Titles ===
- Kende (in Arabic sources) or megas archon (in Byzantine sources), rex (in Latin sources), the Grand Prince of Hungarians (after 907 CE)
- Gyla or djila (gyula) or magnus princeps (in western sources), the military leader (second rank), the Grand Prince of Hungarians
- Horca, Kharkhas, the judge (third rank)

== Population ==
There are various estimates of the size of the country's population in the 10th century, ranging from 250,000 to 1.5 million in 900 AD. There is no archaeological evidence that the Hungarian nobles lived in castles in the 10th century. Archaeology revealed only one fortified building dated to the late 9th century (the castle of Mosapurc). Only excavations of 11th century buildings give certain evidence of castle building. However, the result of the excavations in Borsod may imply that the prelates and nobles lived in stone houses as early as the 10th century. Muslim geographers mentioned that Hungarians lived in tents. Beside tents, the common people lived in pit-dwellings, though there is archaeological proof of the appearance of multi-roomed and wood-and-stone house types.

== Further theories ==
Some historians believe that Prince Árpád's people were Turkic speakers and the Magyars had been in the Basin since 680s. Their main argument is that the newcomers' cemeteries are too small, indicating that the population was not big enough to make Magyar the dominant language in the Basin. However, it seems that Árpád led the Megyer tribe, and it would be tricky if the Megyer tribe would have spoken Bulgar Turkic. Of course, in principle anything may happen in a symbiosis.

== See also ==
- List of Hungarian rulers
- Magyar tribes
- Seven chieftains of the Magyars
- Hungarian mythology
- Hunor and Magor
- Turul
- Old Hungarian script
