= Gyula III =

Early mediaeval ruler in Transylvania

Gyula III (Prokui?)

Gyula of the Hungarians
- Reign: c. 980-1003/1004
- Predecessor: Zombor
- Successor: Title abolished
- Born: c. Mid-late 10th Century; Principality of Hungary
- Died: 11th Century; Kingdom of Hungary
- Wars and battles: Rebellion against Stephen I of Hungary
- Offices: Gyula
- Issue: Bolya (Bua); Bonyha (Bucna)
- Father: Zombor

Gyula III, also Iula or Gyula the Younger, Geula or Gyla, was an early medieval ruler in Transylvania (c. 980 – 1003/1004). Around 1003, he and his family were attacked, dispossessed and captured by King Stephen I of Hungary (1000/1001-1038). The name "Gyula" was also a title, the second highest rank in Hungarian tribal confederation.

According to Gyula Kristó, his actual name was probably Prokui. However, certain historians like István Bóna disagree with this identification.

== Family ==
Hungarian chronicles preserved contradictory reports of Gyula's family. According to the Gesta Hungarorum, Gyula, or "the younger Gyula", was the son of Zombor and nephew of the elder Gyula. The same chronicle said that Zombor's grandfather, Tétény – one of the seven chieftains of the Magyars, or Hungarians, at the time of their conquest of the Carpathian Basin – had defeated Gelou, the Vlach ruler of Transylvania, forcing Gelou's Slav and Vlach subjects to yield to him. Historian Florin Curta writes that the Gesta Hungarorum presented Gyula's family based on a local legend which "seems to have been blown out of proportions and linked to an earlier confusion between a family name and the name of a military rank [gyula] in the Magyar federation of tribes". Historian Gyula Kristó says that the anonymous writer of the Gesta arbitrarily made a connection between the noble Gyula-Zombor kindred of Pest and Nógrád counties and the family of the gyulas of Transylvania when writing about Gyula's ancestors. Simon of Kéza's Gesta Hunnorum et Hungarorum listed one Gyula among the seven chieftains of the conquering Hungarians, stating that "[a]lthough he came into Pannonia with the others, Gyula finally settled in Transylvania." Finally, the 14th- and 15th-century chronicles (including the Illuminated Chronicle) distinguished three Gyulas, among whom the first Gyula – one of the seven Magyar chieftains – "found a great city which had been built in former times by the Romans" while he was hunting in Transylvania. The great city is identified as Gyulafehérvár (now Alba Iulia in Romania).

The 10th-century Byzantine Emperor Constantine Porphyrogenitus wrote of a Hungarian leader, titled gyula, who was second in rank among the leaders of the federation of the Hungarian tribes. The Byzantine historian, John Skylitzes mentioned a "chieftain of the Turks", or Hungarians, named Gylas, who was baptised in Constantinople around 952. Skylitzes also stated that Gylas "remained faithful to Christianity" and did not invade the Byzantine Empire after his baptism.

One view is that Transylvania in the 10th century seems to have been an independent principality which was governed by a line of princes who were invariably called Gyula; they were the successors, and perhaps also the descendants, of the gyula who had been the military leader of the Hungarian tribal federation at the time of the conquest of the Carpathian Basin. Another view is that the family of the gyulas moved to Transylvania only after 970. The Romanian historian Vlad Georgescu argues that Gyula (Gyla) seems to have been of Pecheneg origin, since Byzantine sources speak of the existence of a Petcheneg tribe called Gylas; a life of the monarch-saint Stephen I also mentions battles with Pechenegs in the heart of Transylvania.

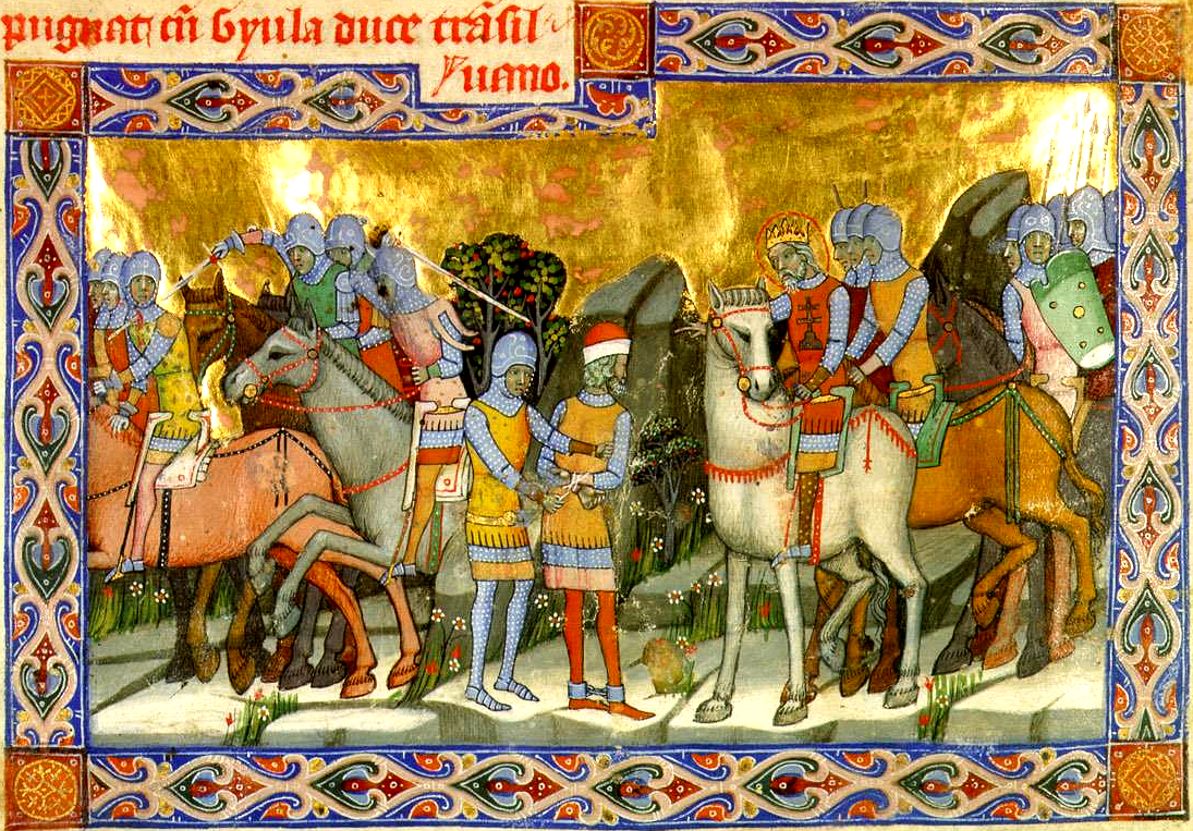
King St. Stephen captures Gyula (Chronicon Pictum)

Before he could be crowned king of Hungary in title and in fact, the young Prince Stephen, whose mother was Gyula's sister Sarolt according to the almost contemporary Annales Hildesheimenses (“The Annals of Hildesheim”), had to battle to overcome rebellious lords led by, among others, his relative and rival Koppány. The Chronicon Pictum ("Illuminated Chronicle") narrates that Stephen inflicted a devastating defeat upon Koppány whose corpse was quartered. One quarter of Koppány's body was delivered to Gyula at his Alba Iulia (in Hungarian, Gyulafehérvár ‘Gyula’s White Castle’) residence in Transylvania. This quarter of the corpse was pinned to the gate of Alba Iulia.

In 1003 (maybe in 1002 or 1004), Stephen, who had been crowned in 1000 or 1001, personally led his army against his maternal uncle, and Gyula surrendered without a fight. The Romanian historian Florin Curta suggests that the only contemporary source to mention Stephen's attack against “rex Geula” is the Annales Hildesheimenses. On the other hand, Thietmar of Merseburg (975-1018) refers to another character (Procui) who was King Stephen's uncle and whose land was occupied by the king. Florin Curta argues that Procui cannot possibly be the same as Gyula: according to the 13th century Gesta Ungarorum, Gyula was captured by King Stephen I and kept in prison for the rest of his life; by contrast, Procui was expelled from his estates, given back his wife, and later appointed warden of a frontier fort by King Boleslav I of Poland. The name Procui is probably of Slavic origin.

King Stephen of Hungary led an army against his maternal uncle, King Gyula; having captured him together with his wife and two sons, he obliged his country by force to adopt the Christian faith.

— Annales Hildesheimenses (Note: Stephanus rex Ungaricus super avunculum suum regem Iulum cum exercitu venit; quem cum conprehendisset cum uxore et filiis duobus, regnum eius vi ad christianitatem compulit. (Annales Hildesheimenses. In usum scholarum ex Monumentis Germaniae Historicis Recusi (1878). Hannover, p. 29.)

Now, I have said enough regarding that matter, since I must still relate certain things regarding Duke Boleslav’s misfortune. The latter’s territory included a certain burg, located near the border with the Hungarians. Its guardian was lord Prokui, an uncle of the Hungarian king. Both in the past and more recently, Prokui had been driven from his lands by the king and his wife had been taken captive. When he was unable to free her, his nephew arranged for her unconditional release, even though he was Prokui’s enemy. I have never heard of anyone who showed such restraint towards a defeated foe.

— Thietmar of Merseburg: Chronicon

Zumbor begat the younger Geula, father of Bua and Bucna, during whose time the holy King Stephen subjugated to himself the land of Transylvania and led Geula in fetters to Hungary and held him imprisoned for all the days of his life because he was false in faith and refused to be a Christian and did many things against the holy King Stephen, even though he was of the line of his mother.

— Anonymous: Gesta Ungarorum

== See also ==
- Ajtony
- Gesta Hungarorum
- Gyula (title)
- History of Transylvania
- Kingdom of Hungary in the Middle Ages
- Koppány
- Romania in the Early Middle Ages
- Stephen I of Hungary
- Principality of Hungary

== Sources ==
=== Primary sources ===
- Anonymus, Notary of King Béla: The Deeds of the Hungarians (Edited, Translated and Annotated by Martyn Rady and László Veszprémy) (2010). In: Rady, Martyn; Veszprémy, László; Bak, János M. (2010); Anonymus and Master Roger; CEU Press; ISBN 978-963-9776-95-1.
- Ottonian Germany: The Chronicon of Thietmar of Merseburg (Translated and annotated by David A. Warner) (2001). Manchester University Press. ISBN 0-7190-4926-1.
- Simon of Kéza: The Deeds of the Hungarians (Edited and translated by László Veszprémy and Frank Schaer with a study by Jenő Szűcs) (1999). CEU Press. ISBN 963-9116-31-9.
- The Hungarian Illuminated Chronicle: Chronica de Gestis Hungarorum (Edited by Dezső Dercsényi) (1970). Corvina, Taplinger Publishing. ISBN 0-8008-4015-1.

=== Secondary sources ===
- Curta, Florin (2001). "Transylvania around A.D. 1000". In Urbańczyk, Przemysław (ed.). Europe around the year 1000. Wydawn. DiG. pp. 141–165. ISBN 978-837-1-8121-18.
- Engel, Pál (2001). The Realm of St Stephen: A History of Medieval Hungary, 895–1526. I.B. Tauris Publishers. ISBN 1-86064-061-3.
- Georgescu, Vlad (1991). The Romanians: A History. Ohio State University Press. ISBN 0-8142-0511-9.
- Kontler, László (1999). Millennium in Central Europe: A History of Hungary. Atlantisz Publishing House. ISBN 963-9165-37-9.
- Kristó, Gyula (2003). Early Transylvania (895-1324). Lucidus Kiadó. ISBN 963-9465-12-7.
- Molnár, Miklós (2001). A Concise History of Hungary. Cambridge University Press. ISBN 978-0-521-66736-4.
- Pop, Ioan Aurel (1996). Romanians and Hungarians from the 9th to the 14th Century: The Genesis of the Transylvanian Medieval State. Centrul de Studii Transilvane, Fundaţia Culturală Română. ISBN 973-577-037-7.
- Sălăgean, Tudor (2006). Tara lui Gelou: Contributii la istoria Transilvaniei de Nord in secolele IX-XI [Gelou's Realm: Contribution to the History of Northern Transylvania in the 9th–11th Centuries] (in Romanian). Ed. Argonaut. ISBN 978-973-109-007-8.
- Szegfű, László (1994). "Gyula 3.". In Kristó, Gyula; Engel, Pál; Makk, Ferenc (eds.). Korai magyar történeti lexikon (9–14. század) [Encyclopedia of the Early Hungarian History (9th–14th centuries)] (in Hungarian). Akadémiai Kiadó. p. 245. ISBN 963-05-6722-9.
