= Gyula II =

Hungarian Gyula and Prince of the Keszi Tribe

Zombor (Gyula II)

Gyula of the Hungarians
- Reign: fl. 950-952
- Predecessor: Kurszán or Bogát (?)
- Successor: Gyula III
- Born: c. early 10th century Principality of Hungary
- Baptised: 952; Constantinople, Byzantine Empire
- Died: c. late 10th century Principality of Hungary
- Noble family: Gyula lineage
- Issue: Gyula III; Sarolt; Karold
- Father: Gyula I (?)

Zombor, also referred to as Gyula II or Gylas, was a Hungarian tribal leader in the middle of the 10th century. He visited Constantinople, where he was baptized in 952 with the baptismal name of Stephen.

== Life ==
=== Ancestry ===
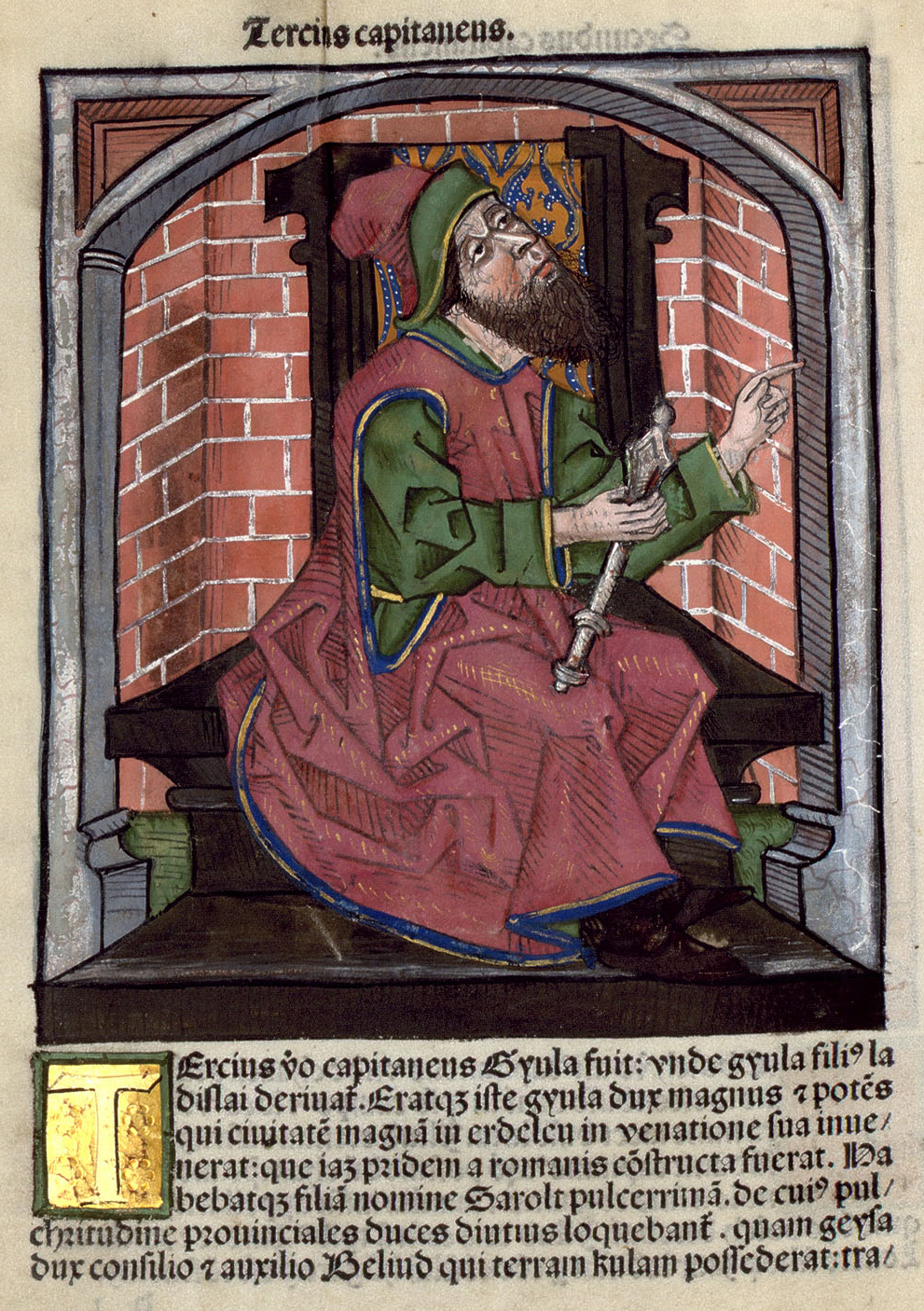
Father of Gyula II depicted in the Chronica Hungarorum as the Third Captain among the seven chieftains of the Hungarians

He descended from a family whose members held the hereditary title gyula, which was the second in rank among the leaders of the Hungarian tribal federation. Hungarian scholars identify him as Zombor (Zubor) who is mentioned in the 13th-century Gesta Hungarorum, although the anonymous author of the Gesta presents Gyula (Gyyla/Geula) and Zombor as being brothers. According to the Hungarian chronicles, his family's progenitor was one of the seven conquering chiefs who occupied Transylvania at the time of the Hungarian conquest of the Carpathian Basin.

=== Ruler of Transylvania ===
The Hungarian historian Gyula Kristó argues that the area where his domains were situated around 950 lay in the region bordered by the rivers Temes (Timiș), Maros (Mureș), Körös (Criș), Tisza and Tutisz (unknown, but possibly the Béga (Bega)), because it equals to the entire dwelling area of Turkia (Hungary) as described by the contemporary Byzantine Emperor Constantine Porphyrogenitus. The Romanian-born American historian, Florin Curta suggests that it is possible that the gyula and the harka (title of the leader of the Hungarian tribal federation) ruled over the southern region of the Carpathian Basin, because most finds of 10th-century artifacts of Byzantine origin found in Hungary cluster at the confluence of the rivers Tisza and Maros. According to the Hungarian Péter Váczy, Gyula’s tribe moved to Transylvania in his time.

Gyula and his tribe centered in the former Roman fort Apulum, located in the settlement later known as Gyulafehérvár, today's Alba Iulia, Romania. Meaning "white castle of the Gyula", the name of the town and the castle refer to Gyula II. Under his leadership, his clan formed a "tribal state" within the Principality of Hungary, which ruled over the tribes across northern and southern Transylvania, according to historian Gyula Kristó. The various Slavic, Avar, and especially Bulgarian groups found in the region were subjugated by the Hungarians and integrated into their own socio-economic order. Archaeological, historical and linguistic research proves that Gyula extended his influence to South Transylvania, where formerly several historians erroneously have placed the Bulgarian principality of local lord Kean.

=== Baptism ===
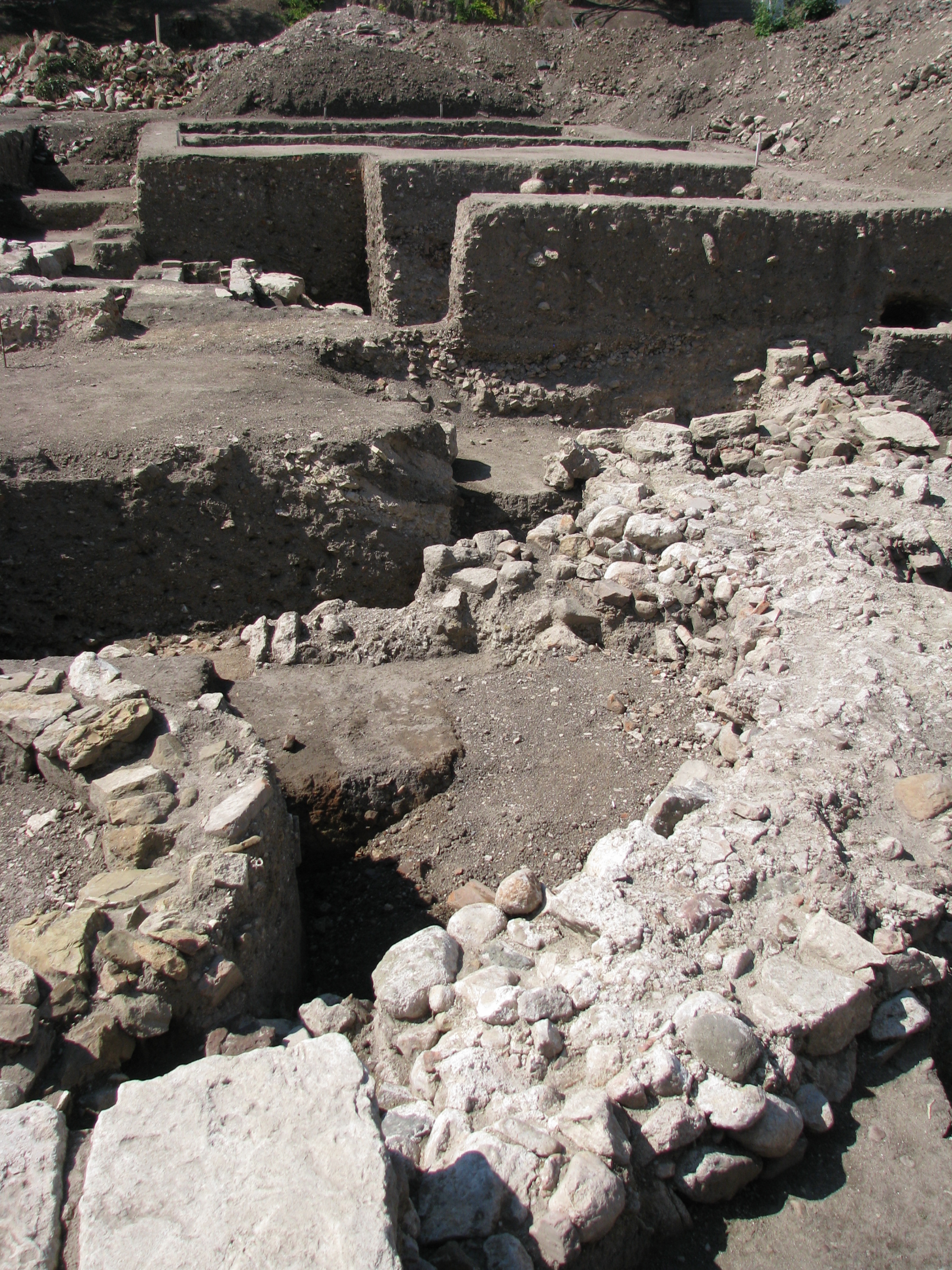
Ruins of 10th-century Christian church in Alba Iulia, Romania. There are theories that it served as seat of the Metropolitanate of Tourkia, which was established under the reign of Gyula II

Not long after [the legation of Bulcsú and Termacsu], Gylas [Gyula], who was also the prince of the Turks, came to the imperial city, was baptized, and received the same benefits and honors. He took with him a monk named Hierotheos, famous for his piety, whom Theophylaktos consecrated as the bishop of Turkia, who, arriving there, led many from the barbaric strays to Christianity. And Gylas remained in his faith, he himself never made an incursion into the territory of the Romans [Byzantine Empire], and he did not forget about the captured Christians, but rather he redeemed them, he was concerned about them and set them free.

— John Skylitzes: A Synopsis of Byzantine History, 811–1057

Ioannes Skylitzes narrates that around 952 Gyula visited Constantinople, where he was baptized, and Emperor Constantine VII lifted him from the baptismal font. Instead of 952, Romanian historian Alexandru Madgearu put the date of Gyula's visit to Constantinople to the year 948, when chieftains Bulcsú and Termacsu were also sent to the city as envoys of Grand Prince Fajsz. While in Constantinople, he also received the honorary title patrikios. Gyula was given a bishop named Hierotheos who accompanied him back to Turkia (Hungary). Thus Gyula adopted the Christian faith, what is more, its Eastern Orthodox (Byzantine) variety. Gyula received the Christian name of Stephen (Stefan or Stephanos) according to Old Slavic sources, such as the Nikon Chronicle. Hierotheos, who was appointed bishop of Tourkia by Patriarch Theophylact of Constantinople, converted many Hungarians. Constantine Porphyrogenitus associated Tourkia with lands to the east of the river Tisza in one of his books written around the same time, which covered the gyulas' territory. Finds of 10th-century Byzantine coins, earrings, reliquary crosses and similar artefacts abound in the region of Szeged. Both facts imply that Gyula's domains were located near the confluence of the Tisza and Maros, according to historian Paul Stephenson. In contrast, Hungarian historian Gábor Thoroczkay argued that Hierotheos' proselytizing mission took place in Transylvania, where Gyula had moved his seat by then.

The cooperative relationship between the Byzantine Empire and Gyula lasted plausibly until 958, when Constantine VII ceased the payment of tribute to the Hungarians following the latter's defeat at the Battle of Lechfeld. Bishop Hierotheos had to leave Hungary with immediate effect. Gyula II had a son, Prokui (Gyula III), his successor as tribal leader in Transylvania, and two daughters, Karold and Sarolt. The latter became the wife of Géza, Grand Prince of the Hungarians. Their only known son, Stephen I, was crowned as the first king of Hungary.

== See also ==
- Gyula (title)
- Gyula III
- History of Transylvania
- Kingdom of Hungary in the Middle Ages
- Romania in the Early Middle Ages

== Sources ==
- Berend, Nóra – Laszlovszky, József – Szakács, Béla Zsolt: The Kingdom of Hungary; in: Berend, Nora (Editor): Christianization and the Rise of Christian Monarchy: Scandinavia, Central Europe and Rus’ c. 900-1200; Cambridge University Press, 2007, Cambridge&New York; ISBN 978-0-521-87616-2
- Curta, Florin: Southeastern Europe in the Middle Ages - 500-1250; Cambridge University Press, 2006, Cambridge; ISBN 978-0-521-89452-4
- Kristó, Gyula (General Editor) – Engel, Pál - Makk, Ferenc (Editors): Korai Magyar történeti lexikon (9-14. század) /Encyclopedia of the Early Hungarian History (9th-14th centuries)/; Akadémiai Kiadó, 1994, Budapest; ISBN 963-05-6722-9 (the entry “gyula” was written by Alfréd Márton, “Gyula” by Sándor László Tóth and László Szegfű)
- Kristó, Gyula: Early Transylvania (895-1324); Lucidus Kiadó, 2003, Budapest; ISBN 963-9465-12-7
- Révész, Éva (2020). "A Gyulák és a magyarok korai kereszténysége [The Gyulas and the Hungarian's early Christianity]". Belvedere Meridionale (in Hungarian). 32 (1): 33–42. ISSN 1419-0222.
- Stephenson, Paul (2000). Byzantium's Balkan Frontier: A Political Study of the Northern Balkans, 900-1204. Cambridge University Press. ISBN 9780521770170.
- Thoroczkay, Gábor (2022). "Gyulafehérvár korai egyházi történetéhez. A Hierotheos-féle térítés [On the Early Ecclesiastical History of Gyulafehérvár (Alba Iulia). The Mission of Hierotheos]". In Bagi, Dániel; Barabás, Gábor; Fedeles, Tamás; Kiss, Gergely (eds.). Ruscia – Hungaria – Europa. Ünnepi kötet Font Márta professzor asszony 70. születésnapjára (in Hungarian). Kronosz Kiadó. pp. 577–585. ISBN 978-615-6339-45-4.
