= Sarolt =

Grand Princess of the Hungarians (c. 950 – c. 1008)

- Grand Princess of the Hungarians
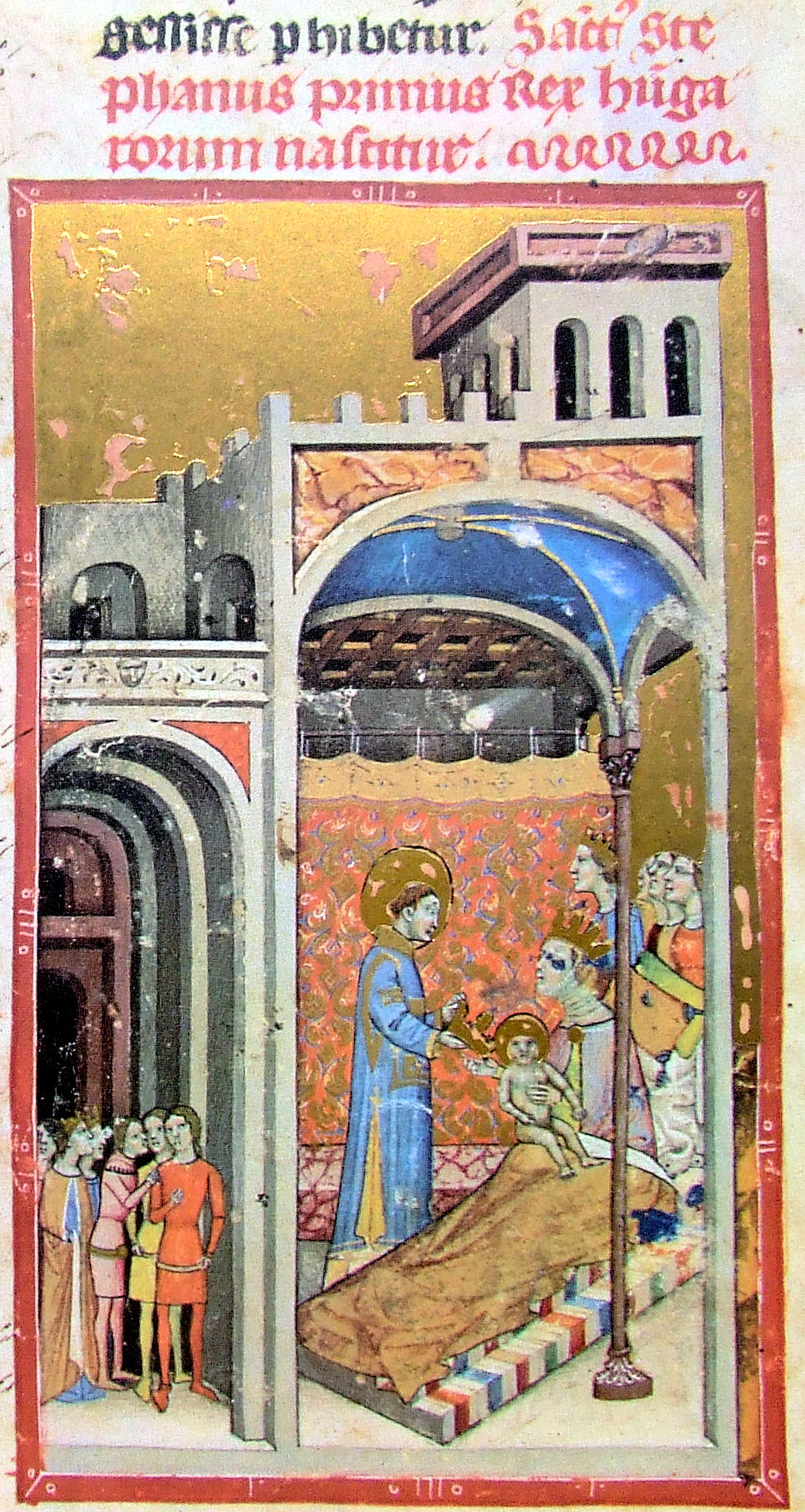
- Stephen's birth depicted in the Illuminated Chronicle
- Tenure: before 972 – c. 997
- Born: c. 950
- Died: c. 1008
- Burial: St. Peter and Paul Cathedral, Székesfehérvár
- Spouse: Géza of Hungary
- Issue: Judith of Hungary; Margaret, Tsaritsa of Bulgaria; Saint Stephen; Grimelda of Hungary; Sarolt?, Queen of Hungary
- House: House of Arpad
- Father: Gyula of Transylvania
- Religion: Eastern Christianity

Sarolt (c. 950 – c. 1008) was the wife of Géza, Grand Prince of the Hungarians.

She was born a daughter of Zombor (or Gyula II), gyula of Transylvania, second in rank among the leaders of the Hungarian tribal federation.

Sarolt exerted a powerful influence on her husband which allowed her to also influence his government. She was watched with suspicion by Catholic missionaries. The chronicles accused her of drinking insatiably and even committing manslaughter.

Sarolt and her husband received baptism late in life. They raised their son as a Christian and changed his name from Vajk to Stephen as a sign of their faith. After her husband's death in 997, one of his distant cousins, Koppány, who declared his claim to the leadership of the Magyars against her son, Stephen (Vajk), wanted to marry Sarolt, referring to the Hungarian tradition. Koppány, nevertheless, was defeated, and shortly afterward Sarolt's son was crowned as the first King of Hungary.

== Ancestry and early life ==
Sarolt was the daughter of a gyula who reportedly converted to Byzantine Christianity in Constantinople after 950, and who then established the first Christian mission in Hungary. It is likely that his family and household, including his daughter Sarolt was baptised in the Byzantine rite, too.

It is unsure whether Sarolt's father was named Gyula or Zombor, but he was the gyula of Transylvania and as such, the second-highest-ranking leader in the Hungarian tribal federation after the Grand Prince of the Hungarians. He was a grandson of Tétény (also known as Töhötöm or Tühütüm), one of the seven chieftains of the Hungarians who led the seven tribes of the Hungarians when they arrived in the Carpathian Basin.

According to the Gesta Hungarorum, Sarolt had a sister named Karold and a brother. This brother can be identified as Gyula III.

Sarolt was born around 950 (based on the birth years of her children). Her name is of Turkic origins (Šar-oldu) and means white stoat. She was married to Géza around 970, which was likely also the start of his rule as Grand Prince of the Hungarians. Géza was a great-grandson of Árpád, who led the Hungarian tribes during the Hungarian conquest of the Carpathian Basin.

== Marriage and children ==
Married to Géza, Grand Prince of the Hungarians (c. 945 – 997)

- Judith (? – after 988), wife of the future King Bolesław I of Poland
- Margaret (? – after 988), wife of the future Tsar Gavril Radomir of Bulgaria
- King Stephen I of Hungary (967/969/975 – 15 August 1038)
- Grimelda (? – after 1026), wife of Otto Orseolo, Doge of Venice
- Sarolt? (? – ?), wife of the future King Samuel Aba of Hungary

== Sources ==
- Kristó Gyula - Makk Ferenc: Az Árpád-ház uralkodói (IPC Könyvek, 1996)
- Korai Magyar Történeti Lexikon (9-14. század), főszerkesztő: Kristó Gyula, szerkesztők: Engel Pál és Makk Ferenc (Akadémiai Kiadó, Budapest, 1994)
