= Metropolitanate of Tourkia =

The Metropolitanate of Tourkia was an Eastern Orthodox diocese (eparchy) and metropolis in Medieval Hungary from the mid 10th century to the end of the 12th century. Its name was derived from the term Tourkia (Greek: Τουρκία), used in the Byzantine Empire as a designation for the Hungarian medieval state. Since the Metropolitanate of Tourkia was created under the auspices of the Patriarchate of Constantinople, the common Byzantine term for the country was also applied to the newly created eparchy. According to some modern scholars, the metropolitanate had jurisdiction over Eastern Orthodox ecclesiastic system throughout the Kingdom of Hungary.

== Bishop of Tourkia ==
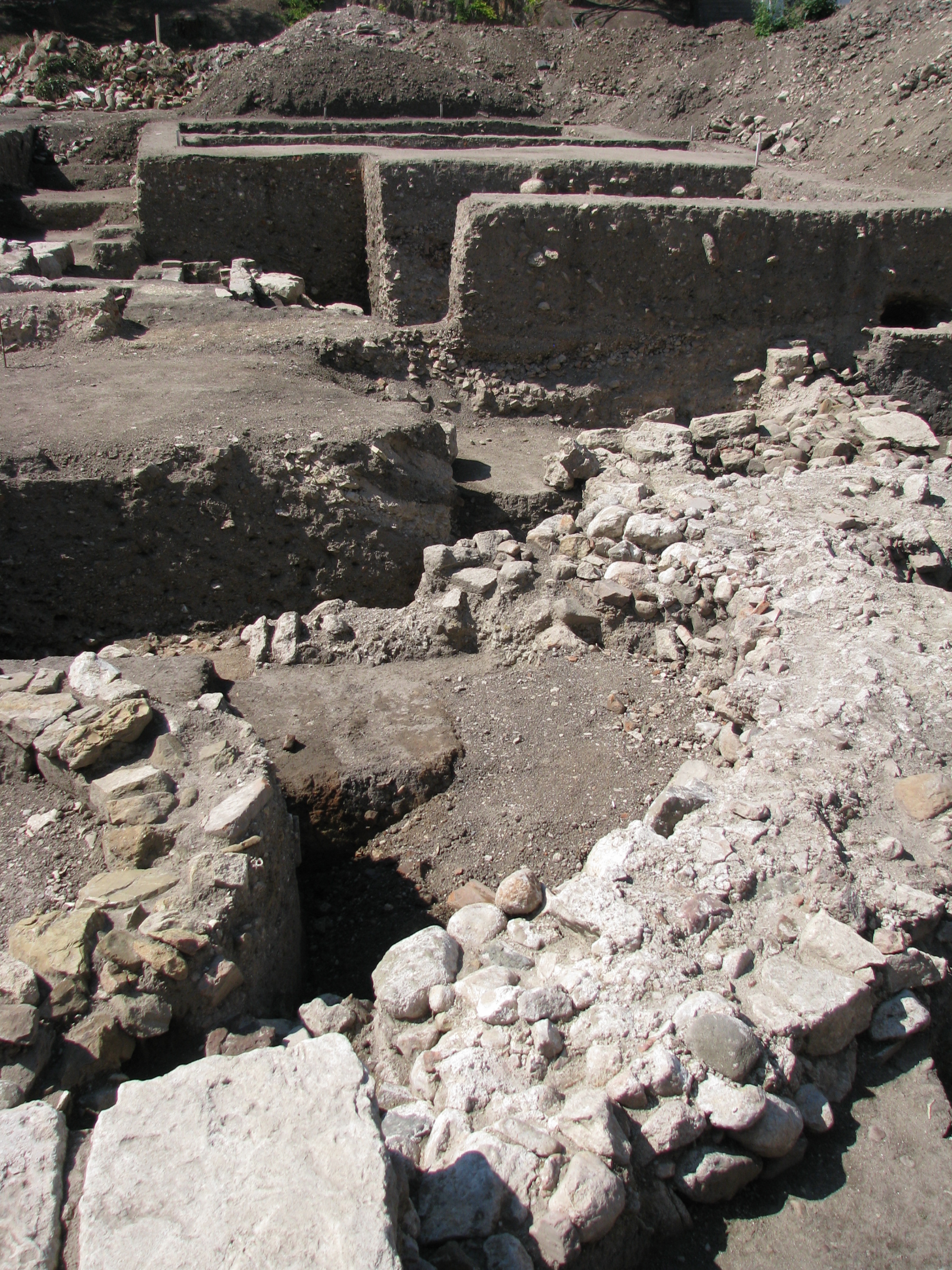
Ruins of 10th-century Christian church in Alba Iulia, Romania. There are theories that it served as seat of the Metropolitanate of Tourkia, which was established under the reign of Gyula II

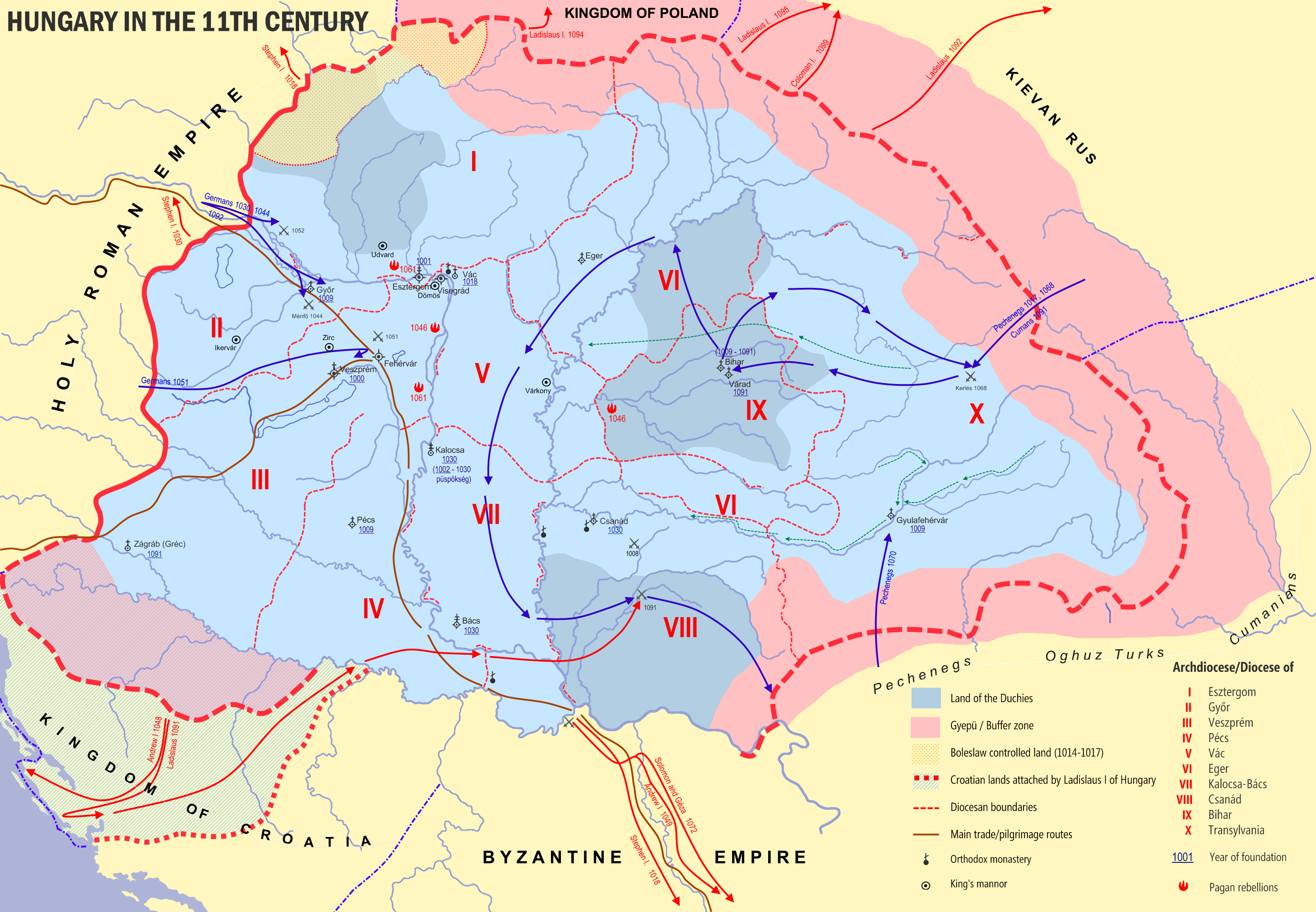
The Kingdom of Hungary in the 1090s, with several Eastern Orthodox monasteries also marked on the map

The Magyars (or Hungarians) invaded the Carpathian Basin in 895 or 896. They settled in the lowlands along the Middle Danube and consolidated their authority in the region during the subsequent decades. Contemporaneous Byzantine authors referred to Hungarians as Tourkoi ("Turks") and to their land as Tourkia ("Turkey") in the 10th century. Many practiced a religion referred to in modern times as Taltosism, with shamanistic and animistic elements, akin to Tengrism. They were described as star- and fire-worshipers by Muslim geographers. In search for booty, they made regular raids, primarily against Central and Western Europe in the early 10th century. They also invaded the Balkan territories of the Byzantine Empire in 934 and 943, forcing the Byzantines to sign a peace treaty. One of the Hungarians' principal military commanders, the Karhas Bulcsú, was baptised in Constantinople in 948. Bulcsú's conversion was not sincere and he launched new plundering raids against the Byzantine Empire in the early 950s.

The second-ranked Hungarian chieftain, Gylas, received baptism in Constantinople around 952. The Byzantine Emperor Constantine VII Porphyrogenitus rewarded him with the honorary title of patrikios, entitling him to a yearly subsidy. The Ecumenical Patriarch tasked a monk, Hierotheos, with the conversion of Gylas' subjects and consecrated him bishop. Hierotheos accompanied Gylas back to his realm where he converted many Hungarians, according to the Byzantine historian John Skylitzes. Porphyrogenitus associated Tourkia with lands to the east of the river Tisza in one of his books written around the same time. Finds of 10th-century Byzantine coins, earrings, reliquary crosses and similar artefacts abound in the region of Szeged. Both facts imply that Gylas' domains were located near the confluence of the Tisza and Maros, but this interpretation is not universally accepted by modern historians.

== Metropolitan of Tourkia ==
One "Ioannes, metropolitan of Tourkia" attended the synod convoked by the Ecumenical Patriarch to Constantinople in 1028. At the list of the participants, Ioannes was mentioned as the last among the metropolitans, showing that his see had been recently established or elevated to the rank of metropolitanate. A 12th-century register of the dioceses subject to Constantinople lists the metropolitanate of Tourkia at the 60th entry, only followed by the metropolitanate of Rhôsia (or Kievan Rus'). A seal of Antonios, synkellos of Tourkia also dates to the 11th century.

== See also ==
- History of Christianity in Hungary
- Eastern Orthodoxy in Hungary

== Sources ==
- Baán, István (1997). "The Foundation of the Archbishopric of Kalocsa: The Byzantine Origin of the Second Archdiocese in Hungary". Early Christianity in Central and East Europe. Warszawa: Semper. pp. 67–74. ISBN 9788386951338.
- Baán, István (1999). "The Metropolitanate of Tourkia: The Organization of the Byzantine Church in Hungary in the Middle Ages". Byzanz und Ostmitteleuropa 950-1453. Wiesbaden: Harrassowitz Verlag. pp. 45–53. ISBN 9783447041461.
- Berend, Nora; Laszlovszky, József; Szakács, Béla Zsolt (2007). "The kingdom of Hungary". In Berend, Nora (ed.). Christianization and the Rise of Christian Monarchy: Scandinavia, Central Europe and Rus', c. 900–1200. Cambridge University Press. pp. 319–368. ISBN 978-0-521-87616-2.
- Berend, Nora; Urbańczyk, Przemysław; Wiszewski, Przemysław (2013). Central Europe in the High Middle Ages: Bohemia, Hungary and Poland, c. 900-c. 1300. New York: Cambridge University Press. ISBN 9780521781565.
- Curta, Florin (2006). Southeastern Europe in the Middle Ages, 500–1250. Cambridge: Cambridge University Press. ISBN 978-0-521-81539-0.
- Koszta, László (2014). "Byzantine Archiepiscopal Ecclesiastical System in Hungary?". The Carpathian Basin, the Hungarians and Byzantium. Szeged: Szegedi Tudományegyetem. pp. 127–143.
- Madgearu, Alexandru (2008). "The Mission of Hierotheos: Location and Significance". Byzantinoslavica. 66: 119–138.
- Madgearu, Alexandru (2017). "Further Considerations on Hierotheos' Mission to the Magyars". Acta Musei Napocensis. 54 (2): 1–16.
- Nesbitt, John; Oikonomides, Nicolas, eds. (1991). Catalogue of Byzantine Seals at Dumbarton Oaks and in the Fogg Museum of Art, Volume 1: Italy, North of the Balkans, North of the Black Sea. Vol. 1. Washington, DC: Dumbarton Oaks Research Library and Collection. ISBN 0-88402-194-7.
- Révész, Éva (2014). ""Turkia" keleti keresztény főpapjai az első ezredforduló magyar történelmében [The Eastern Christian High Priests of 'Turkia' in the Hungarian History around the first Millennium]". Belvedere Meridionale (in Hungarian). 26 (1): 7–22. doi:10.14232/belv.2014.1.1. ISSN 1419-0222.
- Stojkovski, Boris (2016). "The Greek Charter of the Hungarian King Stephen I". Зборник радова Византолошког института. 53: 127–140.
- Stephenson, Paul (2000). Byzantium's Balkan Frontier: A Political Study of the Northern Balkans, 900-1204. Cambridge University Press. ISBN 9780521770170.
- Thoroczkay, Gábor (2022). "Gyulafehérvár korai egyházi történetéhez. A Hierotheos-féle térítés [On the Early Ecclesiastical History of Gyulafehérvár (Alba Iulia). The Mission of Hierotheos]". In Bagi, Dániel; Barabás, Gábor; Fedeles, Tamás; Kiss, Gergely (eds.). Ruscia – Hungaria – Europa. Ünnepi kötet Font Márta professzor asszony 70. születésnapjára (in Hungarian). Kronosz Kiadó. pp. 577–585. ISBN 978-615-6339-45-4.
