= Gyula (title) =

Title in the Hungarian tribal federation

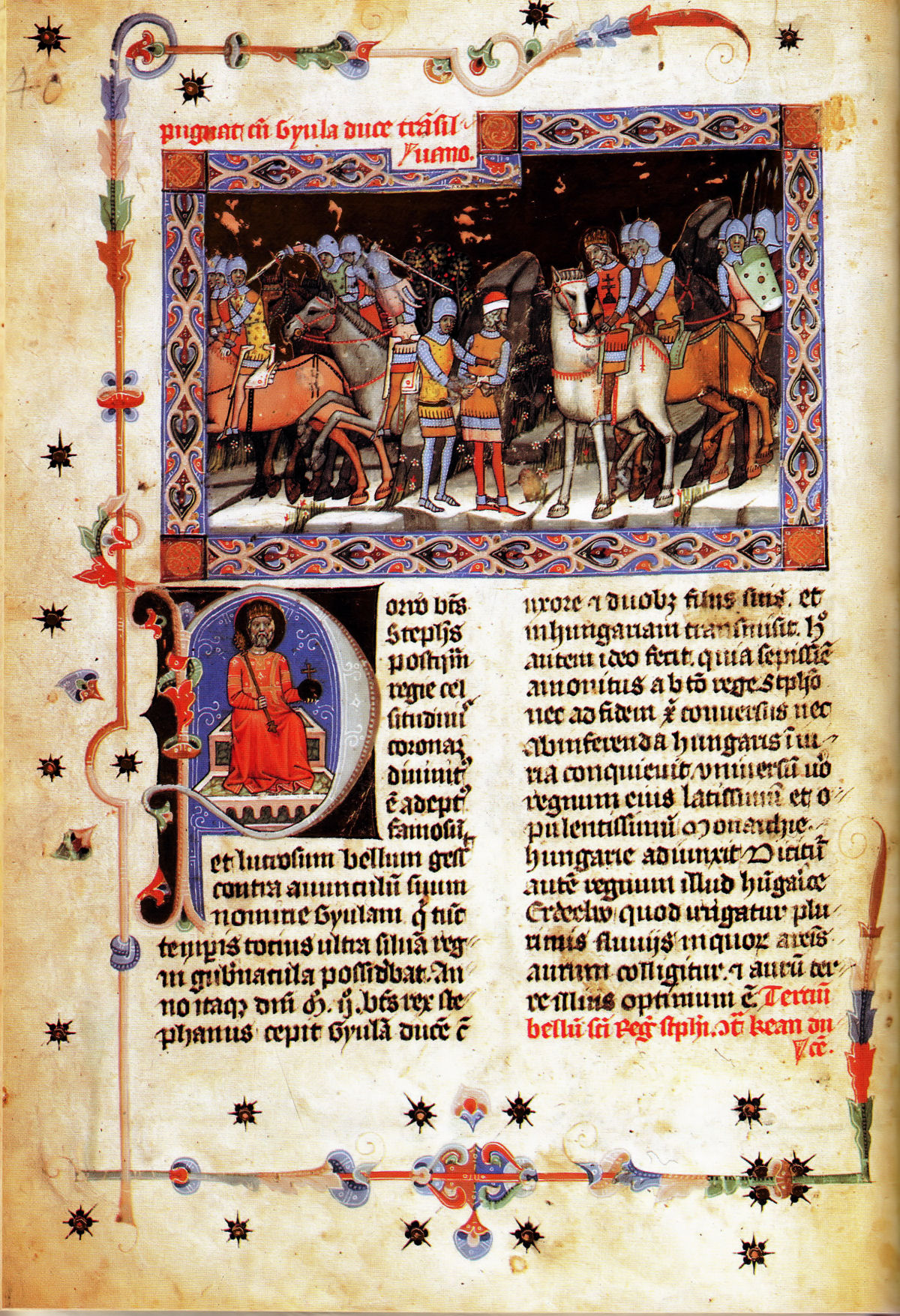
King St. Stephen captures Gyula (Chronicon Pictum)

Gyula (Yula, Gula, Gila) was, according to Muslim and Byzantine sources, the title of one of the leaders, the second in rank, of the Hungarian tribal federation in the 9th–10th centuries. In the earliest Hungarian sources, the title name is only recorded as a personal name (Gyyla, Geula, Gyla, Iula).

According to the Hungarian chronicles, Transylvania was ruled by a line of princes called Gyula, and their country was occupied by King Stephen I of Hungary (1000/1001–1038).

== Etymology ==
The etymology of the word is disputed. It is often traditionally considered of Turkic origin, however other etymological explanations have recently been proposed, as both Hungarian as well as Turkish share ancestral - linguistic similarities. According to Lóránd Benkő, the word originates from Old Turkic, where it can be found as a personal- (altaic: Kaltanjula), genus- (Bulgar: Дуло - Dulo) and tribal (Pecheneg: Yula, Bashkir: Yulaman) name. It was transferred as a title in the Hungarian language, presumably from the Khazar language. Benkő assumed a *ǰula form derived from a Turkic word meaning 'torch'. Related words of Turkic origin can be found in the Hungarian language: gyúl (to catch fire, to be ignited) cf. West Old Turkic: *jul; East Old Turkic: *yul. András Róna-Tas and Árpád Berta also consider the latter to be Turkic. On the other hand, Dániel Németh suggested that the word may have Uralic origins, due to Hungarian influences reaching even the far Easts. He derives it from the Finno-Ugric *ćȣlkɜ-, *ćȣ̈lkɜ- (shines, gleam, glitter) and the Ugric*čittɜ- (shine, illuminate) words. This theory was criticized by János B. Szabó and Balázs Sudár: "Recently, Dániel Németh presented a strongly hypothetical etymological proposal based on both a Turkic and Finno-Ugric linguistic background, deviating from historical data."

== The gyulas in the 9th century ==
The first data of the title, recorded by Ibn Rusta and Gardizi, can be traced back to the earlier works of Abu Abdallah al-Jayhani. According to these earliest pieces of evidence, the Hungarians were ruled conjointly by two ‘kings’. The major one, called kende (or künde), enjoyed nominal leadership, while effective power was exercised by his colleague, inferior in rank, called the gyula. This peculiar form of governance (‘dual kingship’) is generally supposed to have been imitative of the Khazar Khaganate, which did indeed have a similar organization. However, the only thing that the Muslim sources tell us is that the gyula was in charge of the military matters of the tribal confederation; whereas there existed a legitimate ruler (the kende) who had little influence on army-related issues.

The Majgars are a race of the Turks and their leader rides out with horsemen to the number of 20,000. Their leader is called künde [kende], but this is only a nominal title, for the name of the man who is actually king over them is called jila [jula] and all the Majgars accept the orders of their jila [jula] in the matters of war and defense and the like.

— Ibn Rusta

These Majgars are a type of the Turks. Their leader rides out with 20,000 warriors. This leader they call künde [kende]. This is the title of the greater of their kings. That leader who appoints the functionaries they call jula [jole]. What the jula commands, the Majgars do.

— Gardizi

== The gyulas in the 10th-11th centuries ==
Following the Hungarian conquest of the Carpathian Basin around 896, the title gyula can be found in the De administrando imperio ("On the Governance of the Empire") written by the Byzantine Emperor Constantine Porphyrogenitus. The emperor confirms that around 950 the gyla was one of the two important officers who assisted the leader of Hungarian tribal federation; also, each tribe had a chieftain.

They /the Hungarians/ have for their first chief the prince who comes by succession of Árpád’s family, and two others, the gylas and the karchas, who have the rank of judge; and each clan has a prince.
The karchas Boultzous is the son of the karchas Kalis, and Kalis is a proper name, but karchas is a dignity, like gylas, which is superior to karchas.

— Constantine Porphyrogenitus: De administrando imperio 115vP, 116rP.

The Byzantine Ioannes Skylitzes in the second half of the 11th century recounted (using earlier written sources) the baptism of the Hungarian chieftain Gyula (or gyula) in Constantinople in the mid-10th century. According to Ioannes Skylitzes, Gyula stayed true to his new faith and took a missionary bishop, Hierotheos, with him. A Slavic source also contains related information.

The almost contemporary Annales Hildesheimenses ("The Annals of Hildesheim") recorded for 1003 that "King Stephen of Hungary led an army against his maternal uncle, King Gyula" and "obliged his country by force to adopt the Christian faith".

== Persons named Gyula in the Hungarian chronicles ==
=== The Gesta Hungarorum written by an anonymous author ===
The anonymous writer of the Gesta Hungarorum ("The Deeds of the Hungarians") was the first Hungarian chronicler who compiled the list of the seven Hungarian conqueror chiefs around 1210. At the seventh place we can find Tétény (Tuhutum), his son Horka (Horca) and the latter's sons, Gyula (Gyyla/Geula) and Zombor (Zubor). According to the author of the Gesta, Zombor (Zubor) was the father of the younger Gyula (Geula/Gyla). The Gesta also narrates that Tétény occupied the land of Transylvania from the Vlach (Romanian) Duke Gelou; neither Tétény nor Gelou are mentioned in other primary sources.

And while they tarried there some while, Tuhutum father of Horca, as he was a shrewd man, when he learned from the inhabitants of the goodness of the land of Transylvania, where Gelou, a certain Vlach, held sway, strove through the grace of Duke Árpád, his lord, to acquire the land of Transylvania for himself and his posterity. This was later so done, for the posterity of Tuhutum up to the time of the holy King Stephen held the land of Transylvania and would have held it longer, had the younger Gyula with his two sons, Bolya and Bonyha, wished to be Christians and not always opposed the holy king, as will be said in the following.
As he was in flight, hastening to his castle beside the Szamos River, Tuhutum’s warriors, boldly pursuing Duke Gelou, slew him beside the Kapus River. Then the inhabitants of the land, seeing the death of their lord, giving the right hand of their own free will chose to themselves as lord Tuhutum, father of Horca, and in that place, which is called Esculeu, they confirmed their troth with an oath and from that day the place is called Esculeu, because they swore there. Tuhutum possessed that land peacefully and happily from that day, but his posterity possessed it only up to the times of the holy King Stephen. Tuhutum begat Horca, Horca begat Geula and Zubor, Geula begat two daughters, of whom one was called Caroldu and the other Saroltu, and Sarolt was the mother of the holy King Stephen. Zumbor begat the younger Geula, father of Bua and Bucna, during whose time the holy King Stephen subjugated to himself the land of Transylvania and led Geula in fetters to Hungary and held him imprisoned for all the days of his life because he was false in faith and refused to be a Christian and did many things against the holy King Stephen, even though he was of the line of his mother.

— Anonymous: Gesta Ungarorum

The family tree of the gyulas according to the anonymous author of the Gesta Hungarorum:

                                     Tétény (Tuhutum) ♂
                                                │
                                      Horka (Horca) ♂
                            ┌───────────────────┴──────────────────────┐
                   Gyula (Gyyla/Geula) ♂                     Zombor (Zubor) ♂
                ┌───────────┴──────────┐                               │
         Karold (Caroldu) ♀   Sarolt (Saroltu) ♀   Gyula the Younger (Geula/Gyla) ♂
                                    ∞ Géza ♂                 ┌─────────┴────────┐
                                       │               Bolya (Bua/Biua) ♂  Bonyha (Bucna) ♂    
                                   Stephen I ♂               │                  │
                                                        Maglód kindred (genus Maglout)

=== The Gesta Hungarorum written by Simon of Kéza ===
Simon of Kéza, who wrote his Gesta Hungarorum between 1280 and 1285, inserted Gyula /Iula/ in connection to Transylvania in the list of the seven Hungarian conqueror chiefs. He, as opposed to the anonymous writer of the Gesta Hungarorum, wrote not about two but only one Gyula.

The third host was commanded by Gyula /Iula/. Although he came into Pannonia with the others, Gyula finally settled in Transylvania.
After St Stephen was crowned and chief Koppány was finally put to death, the King brought his uncle Gyula /Iula/ with his wife and sons from Transylvania to Pannonia.

— Simon of Kéza: Gesta Hungarorum

=== The Chronicon Pictum ===
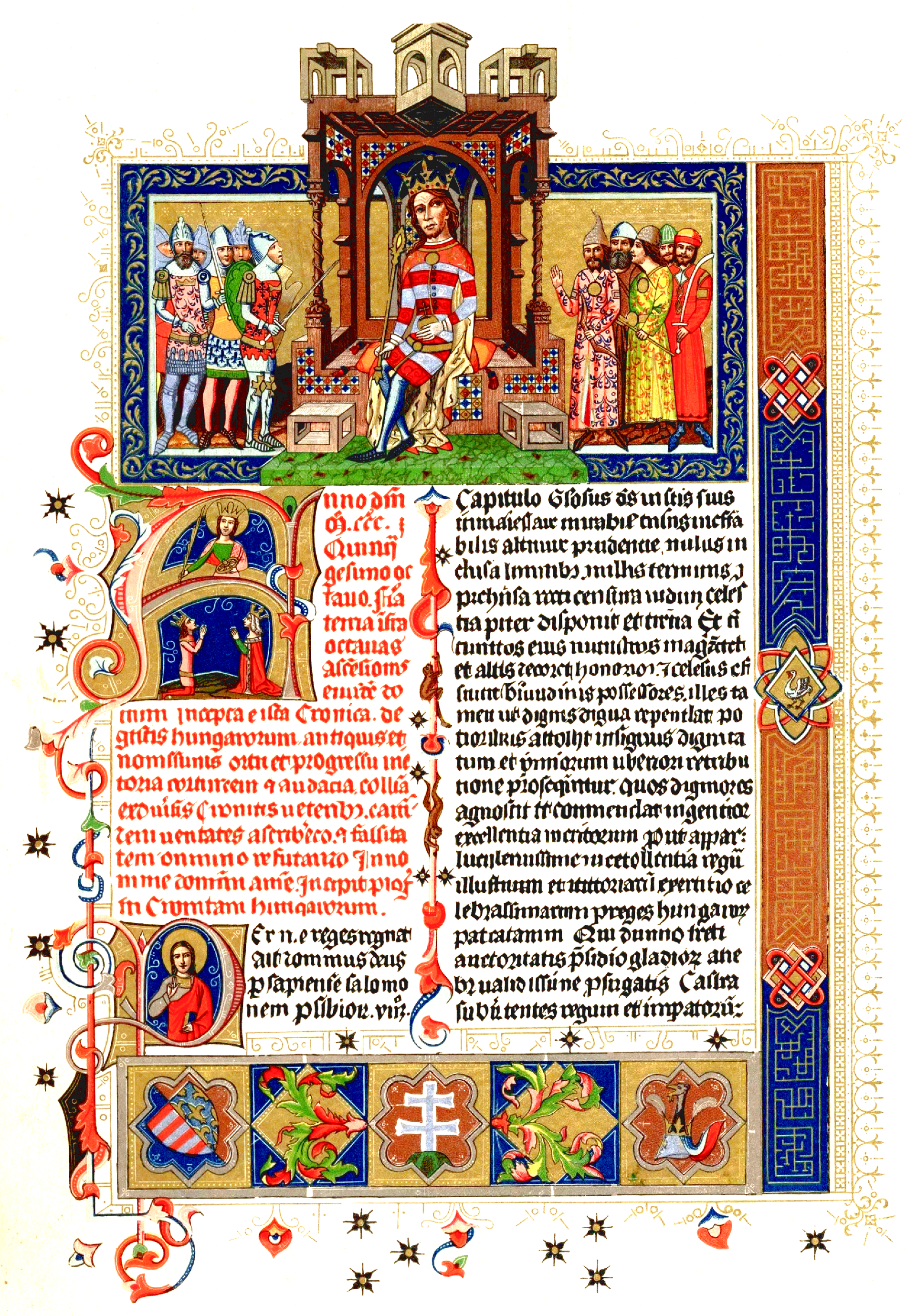
The first page of the Chronicon Pictum

The chronicle increased the members of the Gyula family with the same name to three. However, it caused a problem for the author to separate these three persons.

The chronicle attributes the finding of the ruins of Gyulafehérvár (in Hungarian, ‘Gyula’s White Castle’; Apulum in Roman Dacia, now Alba Iulia, Romania) to the conqueror Gyula.

Gyula was the third captain from whom Gyula son of Ladislaus descends. This Gyula was a great and powerful chieftain; on a hunt, he found a great city built by the Romans long before. He had a beautiful daughter called Sarolt, of whose beauty the princes of several provinces had been talking for a long time. Prince Géza married her as his lawful wife at the advice and with the help of Beliud who possessed the land of Kulán.
Finally, given that Gyula was hostile and often offensive to the Hungarians living in Pannonia, King Saint Stephen had him taken to Pannonia. But this was not this Captain Gyula, but the third one in descent.

— Chronicon Pictum

In a later chapter, the chronicle tells the story of Stephen's campaign against Gyula and the annexation of Gyula's territory (Transylvania) to the Kingdom of Hungary.

Then, after he was awarded the crown of royal majesty by divine ordinance, the blessed Stephen waged a war of fame and of gain upon his uncle, by name Gyula, who at that time held sway over the whole country of Transylvania. In the year of our Lord 1002, the blessed King Stephen took Duke Gyula captive with his wife and two sons and sent them to Hungary. This he did, because Gyula, though admonished many times by the blessed King Stephen, neither would convert to the Christian faith nor would he rest from doing injury to the Hungarians. His entire realm, which was most wide and rich, was now joined to the kingdom of Hungary. This realm is called in Hungarian Erdély; it is watered by many streams, in whose sands gold is found, and the gold from that land is the best.

— Chronicon Pictum

The family tree of the Gyula family according to the Chronicon Pictum:

                         Gyula I ♂
                ┌──────────┴─────────┐
            Sarolt ♀              Gyula II ♂
            ∞ Géza ♂                 │
                                  Gyula III ♂

== The list of the gyulas ==
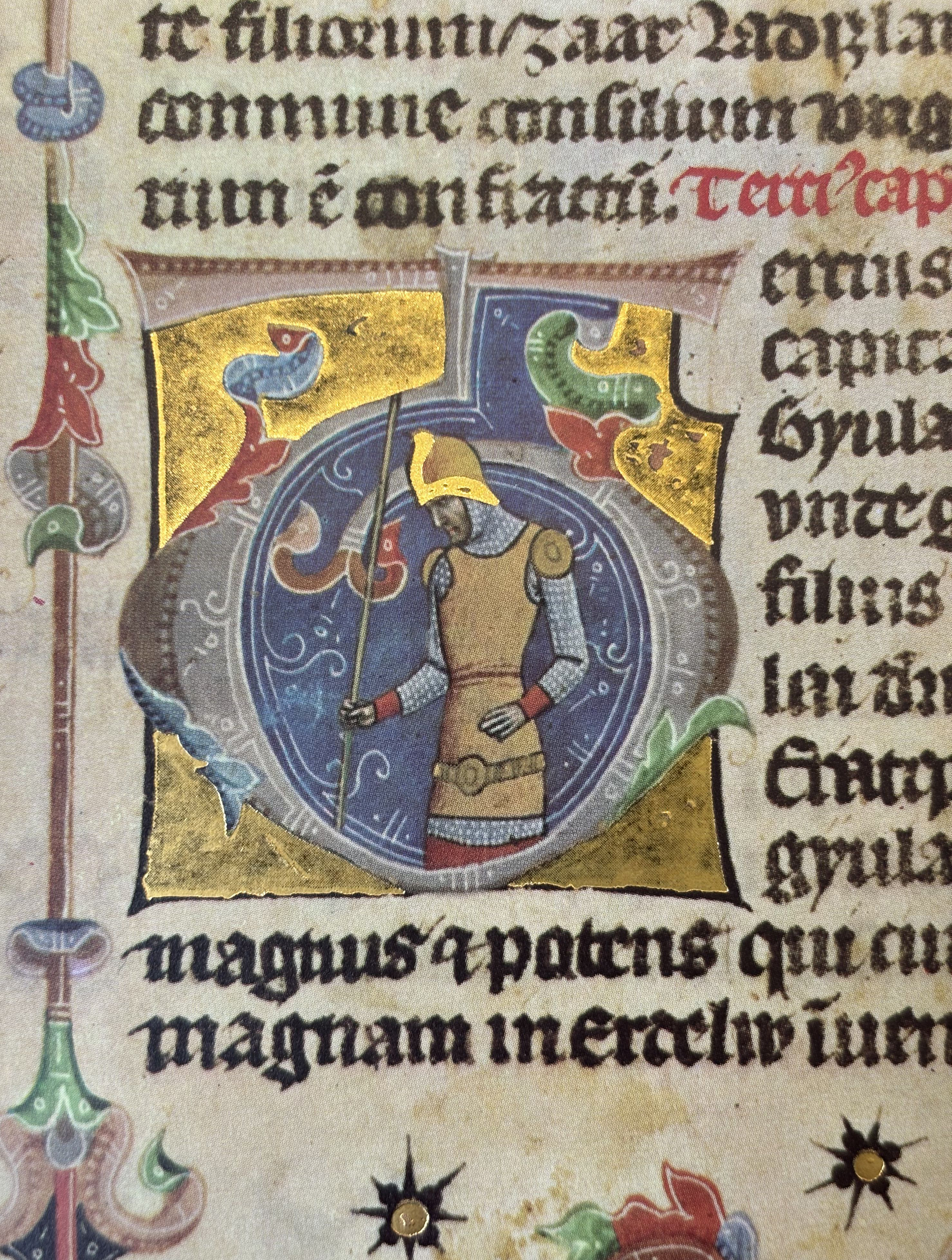
Gyula, third captain of the Magyars during the conquest, depicted in the Illuminated Chronicle

The list of persons who held the gyula office is still subject to debate.

Many historians (e.g., György Györffy, Florin Curta) suggest that at the time of the Hungarian conquest Árpád was the gyula, who was later considered to be the ancestor of the dynasty that ruled Hungary until 1301. At any rate, Hungarian chroniclers are unanimous in reporting that the conquest of the Carpathian Basin was directed by Árpád. Florin Curta suggests that when the kende of the conquest (whom he does not name) died in 902, the leadership passed onto Árpád, and one of Árpád's kinsmen became gyula.

Other scholars (e.g., Gábor Vékony, C. A. Macartney) argues that Árpád was the kende, and the gyula was Kurszán (Chussal, Chussol) whose name, in contrast to Árpád, can be found in contemporary Western texts. (Note: The Annales heremi, the Annales alamannici, and the Annales sangalenses maiores refer to him (Róna-Tas, András op. cit. p. 344).)

The Slavic source narrating the baptism of the Gyula in Constantinople in the middle of the 10th century mentions that his baptismal name was Stefan. According to the chronicle of Thietmar of Merseburg (975-1018), the name of King Stephen's uncle whose country was occupied by the Hungarian king in 1003 was Procui.

The following is the list of the gyulas supposed by modern historians:

- Kurszán (before 894–902) or Árpád (before 894–902/after 902)
- "Gyula I" or an unknown member of the Árpád dynasty (?–?); "Gyula I" may be identical to Kurszán
- "Gyula II" (c. 952/953); his baptismal name was Stefan
- "Gyula III" (c. 980 – c. 1003); his name may have been Procui

== See also ==
- Hungarian prehistory
- Grand Prince of the Hungarians
- Horka (title)
- Kende

== Sources ==
Primary sources

- Constantine Porphyronenitus (author), Moravcsik, Gyula (editor), Jenkins, Romilly J. H. (translator): De Administrando Imperio; Dumbarton Oaks, 2008, Washington, D. C; ISBN 0-88402-021-5
- Kézai, Simon (author), Veszprémy, László (editor), Schaer, Frank (translator): Gesta Hungarorum: The Deeds of the Hungarians; Central European University Press, 1999, Budapest; ISBN 963-9116-31-9
- M. Bak, János; Veszprémy, László (2018). The Illuminated Chronicle: Chronicle of the Deeds of the Hungarians from the Fourteenth-Century (in English and Latin). Budapest-New York: Central European University Press. ISBN 978-9633862643.

Secondary sources

- Berend, Nóra – Laszlovszky, József – Szakács, Béla Zsolt: The Kingdom of Hungary; in: Berend, Nora (Editor): Christianization and the Rise of Christian Monarchy: Scandinavia, Central Europe and Rus’ c. 900–1200; Cambridge University Press, 2007, Cambridge & New York; ISBN 978-0-521-87616-2
- Curta, Florin: Southeastern Europe in the Middle Ages 500–1250; Cambridge University Press, 2006, Cambridge; ISBN 978-0-521-89452-4
- Fügedi, Erik: The Realm of St Stephen: A History of Medieval Hungary, 895–1526; I. B. Tauris, 2001, London&New York; ISBN 1-85043-977-X
- Kristó, Gyula (general editor); Engel, Pál, and Makk, Ferenc (Editors): Korai Magyar történeti lexikon (9-14. század) /Encyclopedia of the Early Hungarian History (9th–14th centuries)/; Akadémiai Kiadó, 1994, Budapest; ISBN 963-05-6722-9 (the entry "Anonymus" was written by Zoltán Kordé, "Árpád" by Gyula Kristó, "Gyalu" by Zoltán Kordé, "gyula" by Alfréd Márton, "Gyula" by Sándor László Tóth and László Szegfű, "Kézai Simon" by Tibor Almási, "Kurszán" by Sándor László Tóth, "Tétény" by Zoltán Kordé)
- Kristó, Gyula: Early Transylvania (895–1324); Lucidus Kiadó, 2003, Budapest; ISBN 963-9465-12-7
- Rady, Martyn: Nobility, Land and Service in Medieval Hungary; Palgrave (in association with School of Slavonic and East European Studies, University College London), 2000, New York; ISBN 0-333-80085-0
- Róna-Tas, András (author); Bodoczky, Nicholas (Translator): Hungarians and Europe in the Early Middle Ages: An Introduction to Early Hungarian History; Central European University Press, 1999, Budapest & New York; ISBN 963-9116-48-3
- Benkő, Lóránd (1967). A magyar nyelv történeti-etimológiai szótára (in Hungarian). Budapest: Akadémiai Kiadó.
- Róna-Tas, András; Berta, Árpád (2011). West Old Turkic - Turkic Loanwords in Hungarian 1-2. Wiesbaden: Harrassowitz Verlag. ISBN 978-3-447-06260-2.
- Németh, Dániel (2023). "Régi és új etimológiák". Magyar Nyelv (in Hungarian). 119 (2): 205–215. doi:10.18349/MagyarNyelv.2023.2.205. ISSN 1588-1210.
