= Gyula Németh =

Gyula Németh is the name of:

- Gyula Németh (linguist) (1890–1976), Hungarian linguist and turkologist
- Gyula Németh (high jumper) (1959–2023), Hungarian high jumper
- Gyula Németh (long jumper) (born 1950), Hungarian long jumper
