= Kurszán =

Hungarian chieftain (died 904)

Kurszán or Kusál (died 904), was a Hungarian (Magyar) chieftain at the turn of the 9th and 10th centuries, who had a crucial role in the Hungarian conquest of the Carpathian Basin. He was kende of the Magyars in the dual leadership with Árpád serving as a gyula - according to a mainstream theory. While kende probably corresponded roughly to the Khazar title khagan, Kurszán's role equated to the Khazar military title bek. In Latin sources he was referred to as rex and some scholars say he had a political status as a sacred king until he was massacred in a political plot of Western rulers and was temporarily succeeded by Árpád. There is also arguments that Kurszán, who appears as an active actor in Western and Byzantine sources, rather held the dignity of gyula, while Álmos then Árpád served as kende, the "sacred king".

== The name of Kurszán ==
According to some historians, such as Gyula Kristó, it is wrong to call the conquering prince "Kurszán". Western sources refer to the leader of the Hungarians as "Kusal", and Georgius Monachus Continuatus (the successor to the Chronicle of George the Friend) says that he was "Kusanes", who received Byzantine envoys alongside Árpád. In earlier times, this person was unanimously identified with the son of Könd, Curzan, mentioned in the Gesta Hungarorum. Later, however, many questioned the correspondence of the two names and thus the identity of the two persons. However, we must also take into account that the name Kurszán was written by chroniclers who did not know Hungarian, and even within the same chronicle it happened that a foreign name was written in different forms.

In the Western chronicles of 902-904 the names Chussal and Chussol are mentioned, while according to András Róna-Tas the original name was Kuszal (Küszel?), possibly Kuszan (Küszen?). The name Kurszán seems to be a "historian's tradition" in the same way as the name of Prince Géza.

== Hungarian conquest ==
He had a crucial role in the Hungarian Conquest (Honfoglalás). In 892/893 together with Arnulf of Carinthia he attacked Great Moravia to secure the eastern borders of the Frankish Empire. Arnulf gave him all the captured lands in Moravia. Kurszán also occupied the southern part of Hungary that had belonged to the Bulgarian Kingdom. He entered into an alliance with the Byzantine emperor Leo VI after realizing the country's vulnerability from the south. Together they surprisingly defeated the army of Simeon I of Bulgaria.

In the summer of 904 Louis the Child invited Kurszán and his entourage to negotiate at the river Fischa. All were murdered there. From this point Árpád became the only ruler and occupied some of the territory of his former partner. The Kurszán family settled near Óbuda where they built Kurszánvára (meaning Castle of Kurszán) as well as in the Csallóköz region. After Kurszán's death, his descendants lived as the Karcsa/Karchai clans. The Karchai Bartal branch, which later became part of the dual Beleházi and Ethrekarchai Bartal lineage.

There are toponymic traces of Kurszán on the right side of the Danube.

== See also ==
- Harka, a judicial role in Hungarian federation
- List of Hungarian rulers
