= Annals of Hildesheim =

The Annals of Hildesheim (or Annales Hildesheimenses) is a Latin anonymous history composed progressively in the city of Hildesheim between the 10th and 12th centuries. It survives in a single manuscript, now Paris, Bibliothèque nationale de France, Latin 6114.

The Annals of Hildesheim is divided into distinct blocks of material or redactions. It is only partially a set of annals. Its first part is in fact a world chronicle that begins with the story of Creation. It recapitulates the history contained in the Old Testament and New Testament, continues with a history of Ptolemaic Kingdom down to Cleopatra V (58 BC) and a history of the Roman Empire down to Heraclius Constantine (AD 641). It ends with a lengthy section on the Carolingian dynasty from the battle of Tertry (687) to the death of Charles the Fat (888) and the first three rulers of the Ottonian dynasty.

The second part, which is by far the shortest, covers the papacy's saeculum obscurum (dark age), the power of the Crescentii in Rome and the papacy of Gregory V (996–999). The third part picks up the history of the Holy Roman Empire from the death of Otto III (1002) and brings it down to the death of Henry III (1056). It is the first part to show an interest in the history of Hildesheim. The fourth part covers the Investiture Contest from 1074 until the death of Archbishop Ruthard of Mainz in 1109. A final block of text covers the years 1077–1137.

The Latin text was edited by Georg Waitz in 1878. There is an English translation.

== Bibliography ==
- Allen, Bethany Hope (2007). The Annals of Hildesheim (MA thesis). University of New Hampshire.
- Corradini, Richard (2019). "What is statute computationis numerum?". Historical Identity Research Blog. Österreichische Akademie der Wissenschaften.
- Schauerte, Thomas (2010). "Annales Hildesheimenses". In Graeme Dunphy (ed.). Encyclopedia of the Medieval Chronicle. Vol. 1: A–I. Brill. p. 68. doi:10.1163/2213-2139_emc_SIM_00135.
- Waitz, Georg, ed. (1878). Annales Hildesheimenses: in usum scholarum ex Monumentis Germaniae Historicis recusi. Hannover.
