= András Róna-Tas =

Hungarian historian and linguist (born 1931)

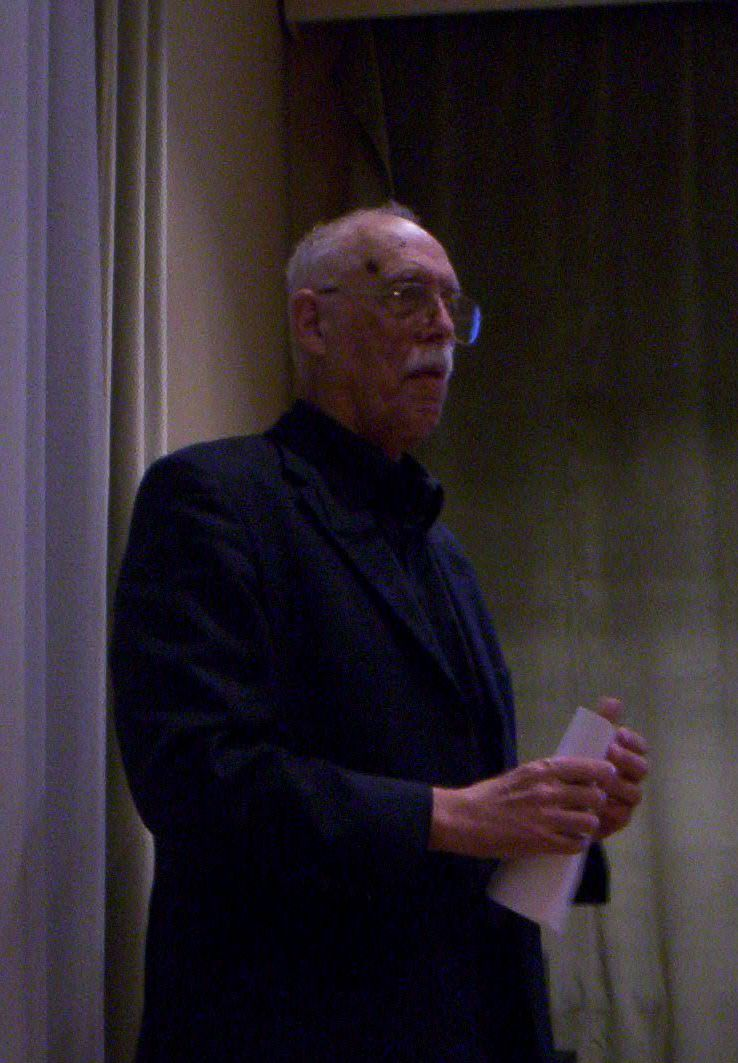
- Rona-Tas in 2008
- Born: 30 December 1931 (age 94); Budapest, Hungary

András Róna-Tas (born 30 December 1931) is a Hungarian historian and linguist.

== Biography ==
He was born in 1931 in Budapest. Róna-Tas studied under such preeminent professors as Gyula Ortutay and Lajos Ligeti, and received a degree in folklore and eastern linguistics (Tibetan, Mongol, and Turkic.)

From 1956, he worked at the Faculty of Humanities of the Eötvös Loránd University. In 1957–1958, Róna-Tas conducted anthropological fieldwork in Mongolia, studying the culture, language, and folklore of the nomadic tribes in that country. During the mid-1960s, Róna-Tas focused his fieldwork on the Chuvash people of the middle Volga River basin. In 1964, Róna-Tas defended his candidates (CSc) degree, and finally in 1971, he earned a doctorate from the Hungarian Academy of Sciences (DSc) with his thesis "The Theory of Linguistic Affinity and the Linguistic Relations between the Chuvash and Mongol Languages", published as Linguistic Affinity in 1978.

From 1968 to 2002, Róna-Tas was professor of Altaic Studies and Early Hungarian History at József Attila University in Szeged, where he is now a distinguished professor emeritus. He has published over 450 papers, monographs and reviews. His magnum opus, A honfoglaló magyar nép, was published in 1996 and an extended translated version, Hungarians and Europe in the Early Middle Ages, appeared in 1999.

In addition to his work on the early Magyars, Róna-Tas has published numerous works on other Eurasian societies such as the Tibetans, Kipchaks, Khazars, Oghuz Turks and Alans. He was awarded the prestigious Humboldt Prize in 1996.

In 2005–2006, Róna-Tas was a Fellow at the Swedish Collegium for Advanced Study in Uppsala, Sweden.

== Selected bibliography ==
- "Turkic-Alanian-Hungarian contacts." (2005) (Journal article in Acta Orientalia Academiae Scientiarum Hungaricae)
- "Khitan word for 'marmot'." (2004) (Journal article in Acta Orientalia Academiae Scientiarum Hungaricae)
- "New publications on Uyghur texts translated from Chinese." (2003) (Journal article in Acta Orientalia Academiae Scientiarum Hungaricae)
- "Old Turkic Loan Words in Hungarian: Overview and Samples." (2002) (Journal article in Acta Orientalia Academiae Scientiarum Hungaricae)
- "Where was Khuvrat's Bulgharia?" (2000) (Journal Article in Acta Orientalia Academiae Scientiarum Hungaricae)
- "Chuvash and historical morphology." (1999) (Journal Article in Acta Orientalia Academiae Scientiarum Hungaricae)
- The Migration and Landtaking of the Magyars (Journal article in The Hungarian Quarterly)
- Róna-Tas, András (1999). Hungarians and Europe in the Early Middle Ages: an introduction to early Hungarian history. Translated by Bodoczky, Nicholas. Budapest New York: Central European Univ. Press. ISBN 978-963-9116-48-1.
