= Gyula Kristó =

Hungarian historian

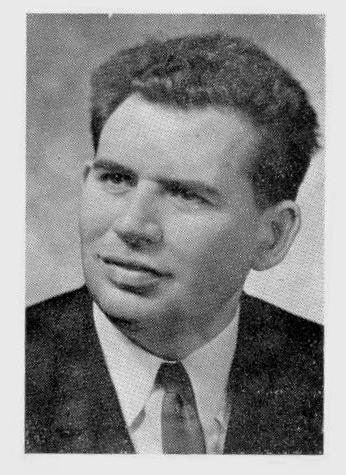
- Born: 11 July 1939; Orosháza, Hungary
- Died: 24 January 2004 (aged 64); Szeged, Hungary
- Occupation: Historian
- Awards: Albert Szentgyörgyi Prize (1994)

Gyula Kristó (11 July 1939 – 24 January 2004) was a Hungarian historian and medievalist, and also a member of the Hungarian Academy of Sciences.

== Life ==
Gyula Kristó was born in Orosháza on 11 July 1939. He studied at the József Attila University Szeged between 1957 and 1962.

== Awards ==
- For the 1300-Year-Old Bulgaria (1981)
- Albert Szentgyörgyi Prize (1994)

== Works ==
- A vármegyerendszer kialakulása Magyarországon [The Development of the Counties in Hungary] (1988)
- A magyar állam megszületése [The Birth of the Hungarian State]

== Sources ==
- Nótári, Tamás (2004-04-16). "Kristó Gyula emlékezete". Jogelméleti Szemle (in Hungarian).
