= Nikolov =

Nikolov (Macedonian and Bulgarian: Николов), feminine Nikolova, is a Macedonian and Bulgarian patronymic and family name, derived from the personal name Nikola and may refer to:

== Surname ==
- Alexander Nikolov (boxer) (born 1940), boxer from Bulgaria
- Andon Nikolov (born 1951), Bulgarian weightlifter
- Asen Nikolov (footballer) (Bulgarian: Асен Николов, nicknamed Bebeto (Бебето); (born 1976, Plovdiv), Bulgarian footballer
- Atanas Nikolov (Bulgarian: Атанас Николов; (born 1977), Bulgarian footballer
- Balázs Nikolov, Hungarian footballer of Bulgarian descent
- Boban Nikolov, Macedonian footballer
- Boris Nikolov (disambiguation page)
- Daniel Nikolov (born 1998), Bulgarian badminton player
- Daniel Nikolov (footballer) (born 2005), Bulgarian footballer
- Dimitar Blagoev Nikolov (Bulgarian: Димитър Благоев Николов; 1856–1924), Bulgarian political leader
- Elka Nikolova, New York-based Bulgarian film director
- Georgi Nikolov (Bulgarian: Георги Николов; (born 1983, Sofia), Bulgarian footballer
- Georgi (Gjorče) Petrov Nikolov (Bulgarian: Ѓорче Петров; 1864/5–1921), one of the leaders of the Macedonian-Adrianople revolutionary movement
- Hristo Nikolov-Choko (Bulgarian: Христо Николов-Чоко; born 1939, Varna), Bulgarian football player
- Ilia Nikolov (Bulgarian: Илия Николов; (born 1986), Bulgarian footballer
- Iliana Nikolova, Bulgarian sprint canoer who competed in the late 1970s
- Ivan Vedar (Bulgarian: Иван Ведър), born Danail Nikolov, often referred to as the founder of freemasonry in Bulgaria
- Kiril Nikolov ("Disl", born 1982), Bulgarian orienteer
- Kiril Nikolov (Bulgarian: Кирил Николов; (born 1976), Bulgarian footballer
- Lyudmil Nikolov (Bulgarian: Людмил Николов; (born 1984), Bulgarian football player
- Nikola Koev Nikolov (Bulgarian: Никола Коев Николов, known as "Mamin Kolyu"; 1880–1961), Bulgarian revolutionary of the Internal Macedonian-Adrianopolitan Revolutionary Organization
- Marija Nikolova (Macedonian: Марија Николова), Macedonian musician
- Mila Nikolova (1962–2018), Bulgarian mathematician
- Natalia K. Nikolova, Bulgarian-Canadian microwave engineer
- Nikolay Nikolov (disambiguation page)
  - Nikolay Nikolov (athlete) (born 1964), Bulgarian pole vaulter
  - Nikolay Nikolov (footballer, born 1981), Bulgarian footballer
  - Nikolay Nikolov (footballer, born 1985), Bulgarian footballer
- Oka Nikolov (Macedonian: Ока Николов; born 1974, Erbach im Odenwald), Macedonian-German football goalkeeper
- Olivera Nikolova (1936–2024), Macedonian author
- Plamen Nikolov (Bulgarian: Пламен Николов); several Bulgarian footballers
  - Plamen Nikolov (footballer born 1957)
  - Plamen Nikolov (footballer born 1961)
  - Plamen Nikolov (footballer born 1985)
- Rumen Nikolov, a Bulgarian sprint canoer who competed in the mid–1990s
- Stoyanka Savova Nikolova, stage name: "Elena Nicolai" (1905–1993), Bulgarian mezzo-soprano
- Tane Nikolov (1873–1947), Bulgarian revolutionary
- Vladimir Nikolov (volleyball) (Bulgarian: Владимир Николов), Bulgarian volleyball player

== Patronymic ==
- Blaga Nikolova Dimitrova (Bulgarian: Блага Димитрова; 1922–2003), Bulgarian poet
- Dimitar Nikolov Yakimov (Bulgarian: Димитър Якимов) (born August 12, 1941), Bulgarian footballer
- Elena Nikolova Yoncheva (Bulgarian: Елена Николова Йончева), Bulgarian freelance journalist
- Georgi Nikolov Glouchkov (Bulgarian: Георги Николов Глушков. (born January 10, 1960, in Tryavna), Bulgarian basketball player
- Georgi "Goce (Gotse)" Nikolov Delchev (Delčev) (Bulgarian: Георги Николов Делчев: 1872–1903), an important revolutionary figure in then Ottoman ruled Macedonia and Thrace
- Hadzhi Dimitar Nikolov Asenov (Bulgarian: "Хаджи" Димитър Николов Асенов; 1840–1868), one of the most prominent Bulgarian voivods and revolutionaries working for the Liberation of Bulgaria from Ottoman rule
- Hristo Nikolov Lukov (Bulgarian: Христо Николов Луков; 1887–1943), Bulgarian general
- Hristo (Christo) Nikolov Makedonski (Bulgarian: Христо Николов Македонски; 1835–1916), Bulgarian hajduk voivode and revolutionary from Macedonia.
- Ivan Nikolov (Nicolá) Stranski (Bulgarian: Иван Николов Странски; 1897–1979), Bulgarian physical chemist
- Jordan Nikolov Orce (1916, Skopje –1942), communist and partisan from Macedonia
- Kliment Turnovski (born Vasil Nikolov Drumev (Bulgarian: Васил Николов Друмев); c. 1841 –1901), leading Bulgarian clergyman and politician
- Nikola Nikolov Stanchev (Bulgarian: Никола Николов Станчев. September 11, 1930 – July 12, 2009), Bulgarian freestyle wrestler
- Petar Nikolov Petrov (Bulgarian: Петър Петров; born 17 February 1955, Svishtov, Veliko Tarnovo), Bulgarian sprinter
- Stefan Nikolov Stambolov (Bulgarian: Стефан Николов Стамболов, 1854–1895), Bulgarian statesman
- Stoyan Nikolov Mihaylovski (Bulgarian: Стоян Николов Михайловски; 1856–1927), Bulgarian writer
- Vasil Nikolov Zlatarski (Bulgarian: Васил Николов Златарски), Bulgarian historian-medievist, archaeologist, and epigraphist
- Vladimir Nikolov Damgov (Bulgarian: Владимир Николов Дамгов; 1947–2006), Bulgarian physicist, mathematician
- Volen Nikolov Siderov (Bulgarian: Волен Николов Сидеров. (born 19 April 1956), Bulgarian politician

== Other ==
- 12386 Nikolova (1994 UK5), a Main-belt Asteroid (died 1994)
