= Battle of Southern Buh =

Battle between Bulgaria and the Magyars

- Part of Bulgarian–Hungarian wars Byzantine–Bulgarian war of 894–896
Date	896
Location	Southern Buh river, Ukraine
Result	Bulgarian victory

Belligerents
Bulgarian Empire Pecenegs	Magyars

Commanders and leaders
Boris I, Simeon I	Unknown

Strength
Unknown	Unknown

Casualties and losses
20,000	Heavy

The Battle of Southern Buh occurred near the banks of the eponymous river (today in Ukraine). The result was a great Bulgarian victory which forced the Magyars of the Etelköz realm to abandon the steppes of southern Ukraine, as well as their aspirations of subduing Danube Bulgaria, retreating to the newly occupied lands beyond the Carpathian Mountains, centering on Pannonia, from where they would stage their next war, against Moravians this time, defeating them and establishing a new Hungary, after the Etelköz state in modern Ukraine, which succeeded an earlier stage of statehood for the Magyars, the legendary although short-lived Levedia, and even one before that, in the actual country of origin for the Magyars, Yugra, beyond river Ob.

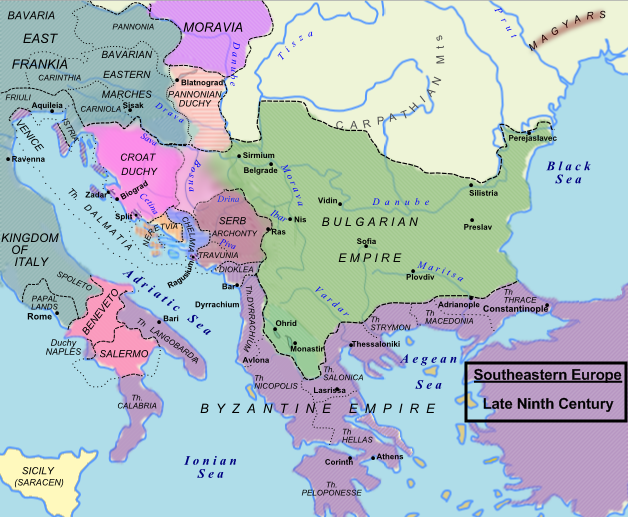
The Byzantine Empire and Bulgaria following the death of Basil I the Macedonian, circa AD 890.

== Origins of the conflict ==
In 894 a war broke out between Bulgaria and Byzantium after the decision of Emperor Leo VI the Wise, to implement a request of his father-in-law, basileopater Stylianos Zaoutzes, to move the center of the Balkan trade activities from Constantinople to Thessaloniki, turned out inducing higher tariffs on Bulgarian trade. In response, Bulgaria's Tsar Simeon I attacked the Byzantines near Adrianople, and defeated them before the end of the year. But then the Byzantines turned to their standard method for handling such situations: they bribed a third party to assist, in this instance, they hired the Magyars of the Etelköz State to attack the Danube Bulgaria from the northeast. The Magyars crossed the Danube in 895, and were victorious over the Bulgarians twice. So Simeon withdrew to Durostorum, which he successfully defended. During 896, he received assistance, persuading the usually Byzantine-friendly Pechenegs to help him. Subsequently, while the Pechenegs began to combat the Magyars on their eastern frontier, Simeon and his father Boris I, (the former tsar who left his monastery retreat to assist his heir in the occasion) gathered an enormous army and marched to the north to defend their empire.

== Battle ==
Simeon ordered three days of fasting, saying that the soldiers should repent for their sins and seek help in God. When this was done, the battle began. It was long and unusually fierce but in the end the Bulgarians were victorious.

== Aftermath ==
The victory allowed Simeon to lead his troops to the south where he decisively defeated the Byzantines in the Battle of Boulgarophygon. The war ended with a peace treaty which formally lasted until around Leo VI's death in 912, and under which Byzantium was obliged to pay Bulgaria an annual tribute in exchange for the return of allegedly 120,000 captured Byzantine soldiers and civilians. Under the treaty, the Byzantines also ceded an area between the Black Sea and Strandzha to the Bulgarian Empire, while the Bulgarians also promised not to invade Byzantine territory.

== Sources ==
- Andreev, Jordan; Milcho Lalkov (1996). The Bulgarian Khans and Tsars (in Bulgarian). Veliko Tarnovo: Abagar. ISBN 954-427-216-X.

== Sources ==
- Obolensky, Dimitri (1974) [1971]. The Byzantine Commonwealth: Eastern Europe, 500-1453. London: Cardinal. ISBN 9780351176449.
- Peychev, Atanas; collective (1984). 1300 Years On Guard (in Bulgarian). Sofia: Voenno Izdatelstvo.
- Runciman, Steven (1930). "The Two Eagles". A History of the First Bulgarian Empire. London: George Bell & Sons. OCLC 832687.
- Whittow, Mark (1996). The Making of Byzantium (600–1025). Los Angeles: University of California Press. ISBN 0-520-20497-2.
- Zlatarski, Vasil (1971) [1927]. History of the Bulgarian state in the Middle Ages (in Bulgarian). Vol. I. History of the First Bulgarian Empire. (2 ed.). Sofia: Nauka i izkustvo. OCLC 67080314.
  - "Part I. From the Slavianization to the Fall of the First Empire (852–1018); IV. Struggle with Byzantium for Political Supremacy; 1. Emperor Simeon and his first war with Byzantium". V. Zlatarski - Istorija 1 B - 4.1.
- Йордан Андреев, Милчо Лалков, Българските ханове и царе, Велико Търново, 1996.
