= Bulgarian–Hungarian wars =

Set of conflicts between the Bulgarian Empire and the Kingdom of Hungary

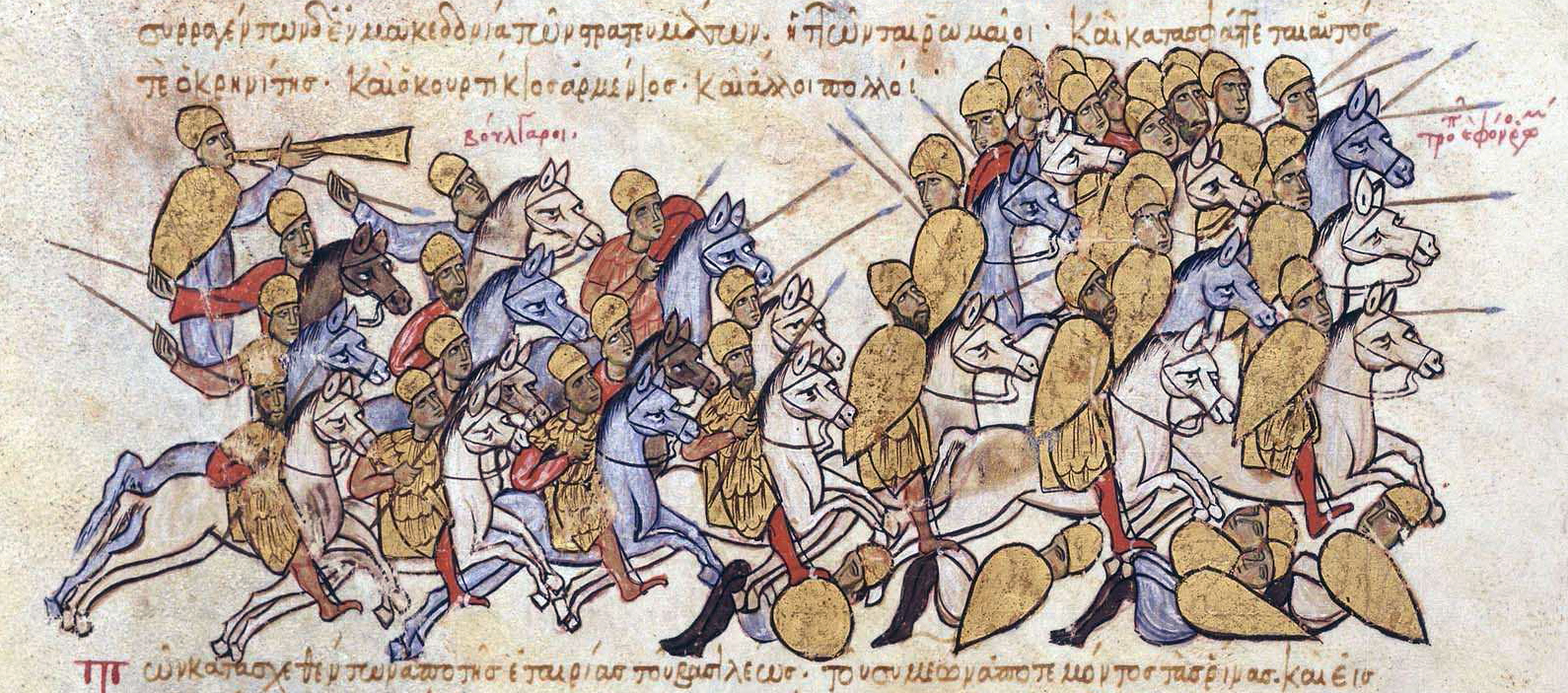
- Tsar Simeon I of Bulgaria defeating the Byzantine and Hungarian armies, led by Procopius Crenites
Date	880–1380 AD (500 Years)
Location	Northern and Western Balkans
Result	Inconclusive
Territorial changes	Many long lasting wars led to vast territorial expansions of both states; Eventual alliance against Ottoman Imperial threat

Belligerents
Bulgarian Empire	Kingdom of Hungary

Commanders and leaders
Boris I Simeon I Duke Glad; Duke Menumorut; Samuil; Duke Ahtum; Constantine Tikh Asen; Duke Gelou	Árpád; Stephen I Andrew II; Béla IV; Stephen; Magister Laurentius; Louis I

The Bulgarian–Hungarian wars (Bulgarian: Българо-Унгарски Войни, romanized: Bŭlgaro-Ungarski Voĭni; Hungarian: Bolgár-magyar háborúk) were a series of conflicts that occurred during the 9th–14th centuries between the First and Second Bulgarian Empires and the Magyar tribes, the Principality of Hungary and later the Kingdom of Hungary.

Clashes first occurred in the late 9th century when the Byzantine Empire recruited Hungarians to attack the First Bulgarian Empire. Simeon I of Bulgaria retaliated by inciting the Pechenegs to attack the Hungarians from the east. During this time, central, eastern and southeastern parts of the post-Avar Carpathian basin were under the control or influence of the First Bulgarian Empire. During the 10th century, the Hungarians overran the Bulgarian dukes in what is now Transylvania as they conquered the Carpathian Basin. Conflicts continued until the middle of the century when peace was restored. Both countries sustained friendly relations until 1003 when another war broke out, further diminishing Bulgarian power in the region.

In 1185, after the re-establishment of the Bulgarian Empire, both states fought numerous conflicts for control over the provinces of Belgrade, Braničevo, Vidin and Severin.

== Hungarian conquest (War of 894–896) ==
A motion map of the Hungarian conquest. Note that the northern borders of the Bulgarian Empire are uncertain.

In 862, at the invitation of their ally the Moravian leader Rastislav, the Hungarians first raided Lower Pannonia. The following year, Louis the German, king of Eastern Francia, retaliated by forging an alliance with the Bulgarians. Boris I of Bulgaria sent mounted troops to help defeat Rastislav. This retaliation began an ongoing conflict which lasted for 25 years, pitting Hungarians and Moravians against Bulgarians and Franks.

The Hungarian Conquest was one of the factors that upset this military balance. In 881, prior to the Conquest, the Moravian Svatopluk received assistance from the Hungarians who advanced as far as Vienna. Two years later, Svatopluk suffered a punishing blow from the Bulgarians. In 892, when Svatopluk once again refused to pay obeisance to the Franks, his Hungarian allies continued to aid him, but the Bulgarians retaliated again.

The situation took a decisive turn in September 892, when the Bulgarian Prince Vladimir informed the Frankish king Arnulf's envoys that the Franks could no longer count on his military aid in the Carpathian Basin; the Bulgarians were only prepared to halt salt deliveries to the enemy. The Frank delegation was still there when Simeon I of Bulgaria ascended to the Bulgarian throne.

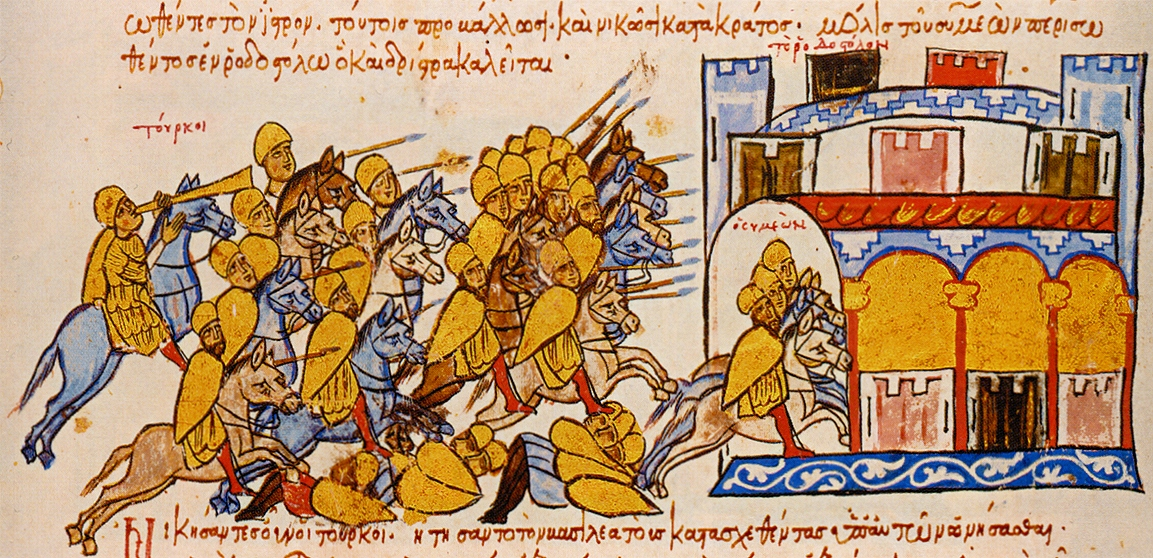
The Bulgarians flee to Silistra after the defeat by the Hungarians.

In response, the Byzantine Emperor Leo VI's envoy Niketas Skleros met on the Lower Danube with the Hungarian ruling princes Árpád and Kurszán, and they agreed to form an alliance. As a result, a Hungarian force (an army of the Hungarians' Kabar auxiliaries, and possibly the Székelys), led by Árpád's son, Liüntika (Levente), was ferried across the Danube by the Byzantines and attacked Simeon's Bulgarians from the rear. Simeon suspended his campaign against Byzantium to turn against the Hungarians. Defeated by the Hungarians, he sought refuge in the castle at Drastar (Silistra).

That same year, in 894, Hungarian warriors advanced into the Carpathian Basin and Pannonia to aid the Moravians in their fight against the Bulgarians' Frankish allies. When they learned of Svatopluk's death, the Hungarians pulled back, though only as far as the region of the Upper Tisza. In spring 895, Árpád followed with his army and, after some skirmishes on the Great Plain, defeated the Bulgarian army. Having hurriedly made peace with Byzantium, the Bulgarians concentrated their forces to defeat Liüntika's Hungarians.

After the Hungarians retreated, Simeon pretended to agree to negotiations – but the Byzantine envoy Leo Chirosphact who arrived to the Bulgarian capital Preslav was put in custody and Simeon deliberately prolonged the peace talks. In the meantime he allied with the Pechenegs and simultaneously launched attacks on the Hungarian encampments in the Etelköz. In the bloody battle of Southern Buh the Bulgarians led by Simeon I and his father Boris I decisively defeated the Hungarians. The ensuing, massive withdrawal by the Hungarians ended in the 'conquest', or rather settlement, of what became the Hungarians' permanent homeland. Soon after the Bulgarian victory, Simeon stopped the negotiations and in the summer of 896 the Byzantine army was routed at the Boulgarophygon.

When the Hungarians arrived to settle in the Carpathian Basin, they encountered little resistance on the part of the Bulgarians. The small but noteworthy communities implanted by the Bulgarians in Transylvania and between the Tisa and Danube did not even have the option of fleeing from the Hungarians, who came in overwhelming force. Likewise the Moravians came under Hungarian rule but continued to use their burial grounds (e.g. Maroskarna) into the early 10th century.

== Conflicts in 10th century ==
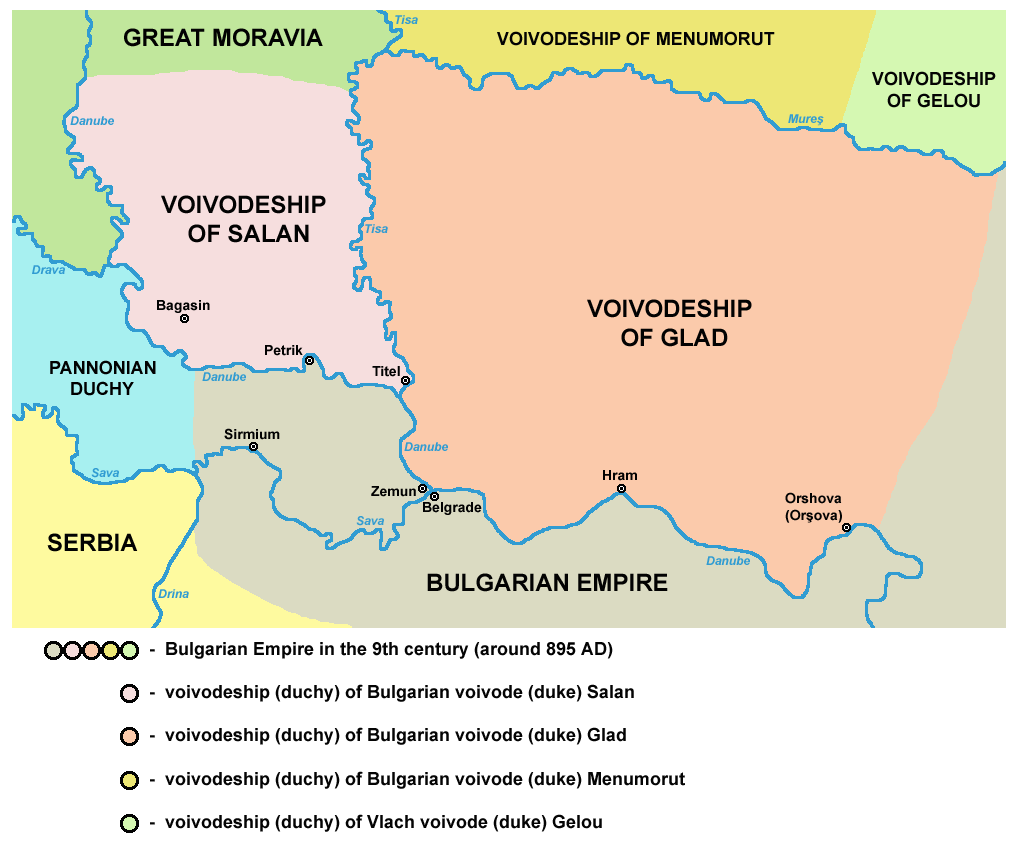
The duchies of Glad and Salan within the Bulgarian Empire. The lands of Menumorut were located to the north of Glad's duchy.

With the emergence of the Árpád dynasty after Kurszán's death, a new clan ruled over the Hungarians. There is no indication of the time when the ruling gyulas transferred their headquarters and residence to the middle Maros valley. The gyula must have been in charge of eastern and southern affairs, for he directed the raids against Byzantium and Bulgaria in April 934 and April 943.

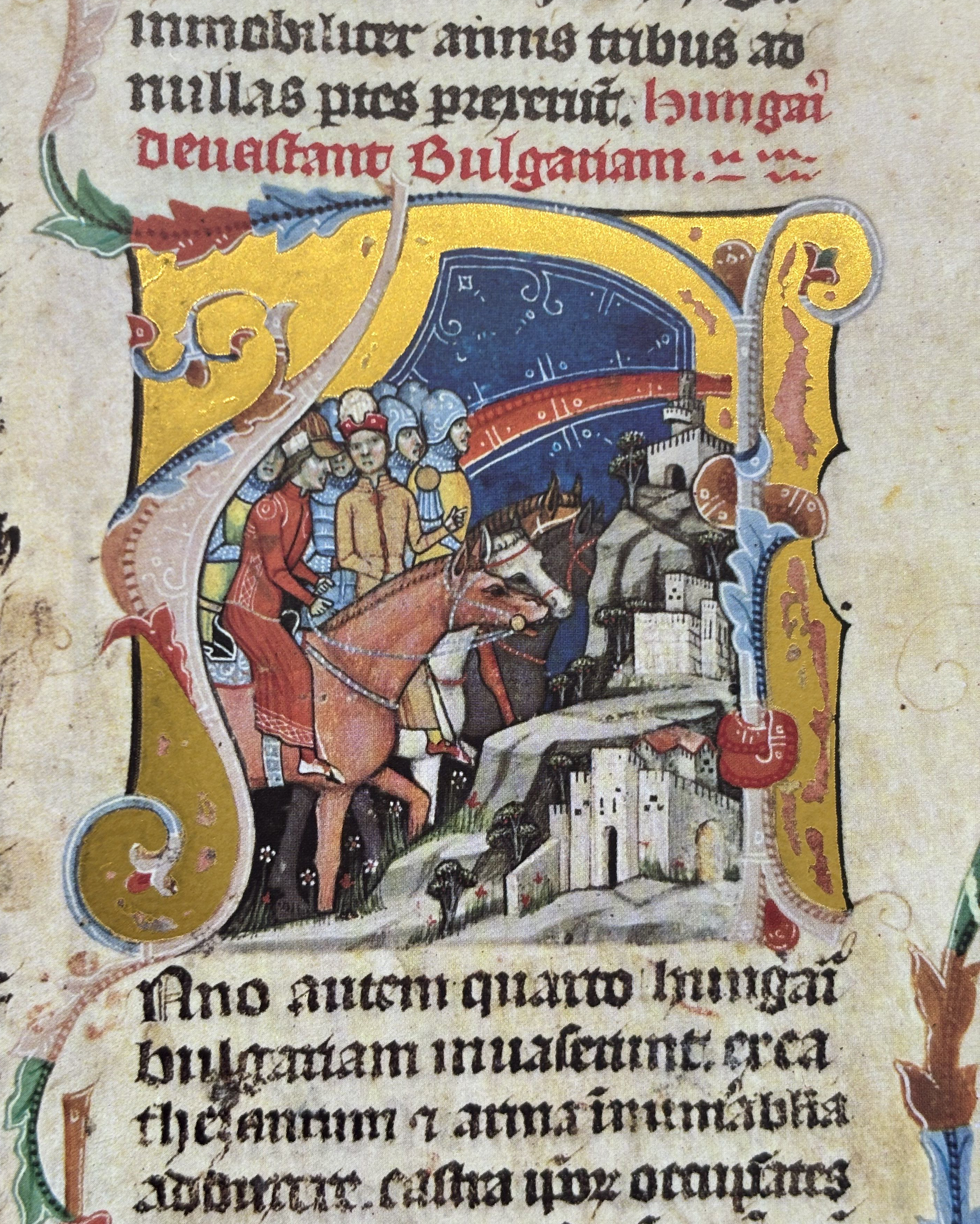
Hungarian warriors in Bulgaria (Chronicon Pictum, 1358)

The blows suffered at the hands of the Pechenegs and Bulgarians in 895–896 induced great caution in the Hungarians. Constantine Porphyrogenetos repeatedly noted that the Hungarians feared the Pechenegs, who were used by the Bulgarians to keep the Hungarians in check. When, early in the 10th century, Byzantine envoys urged the Hungarian leaders to attack the Pechenegs, their proposal was rejected on the grounds that it carried too many risks; in any case, the Hungarians had no intention of reoccupying the Etelköz, now held by the Pechenegs as far as the Danube delta. They tried to preserve peaceful relations with the Pechenegs so that they would be free to concentrate on more westerly targets. The Pechenegs, for their part, preferred to raid the richer lands of the Bulgarians and Byzantines rather than the poorer Carpathian Basin, which was in a state of some turmoil due to the Hungarian conquest. Thus the anti-Hungarian alliance of the Bulgarians and the Byzantine empire gradually fell apart, and the two old enemies, the Hungarians and the Pechenegs, pursued a rapprochement in the face of growing Bulgarian might.

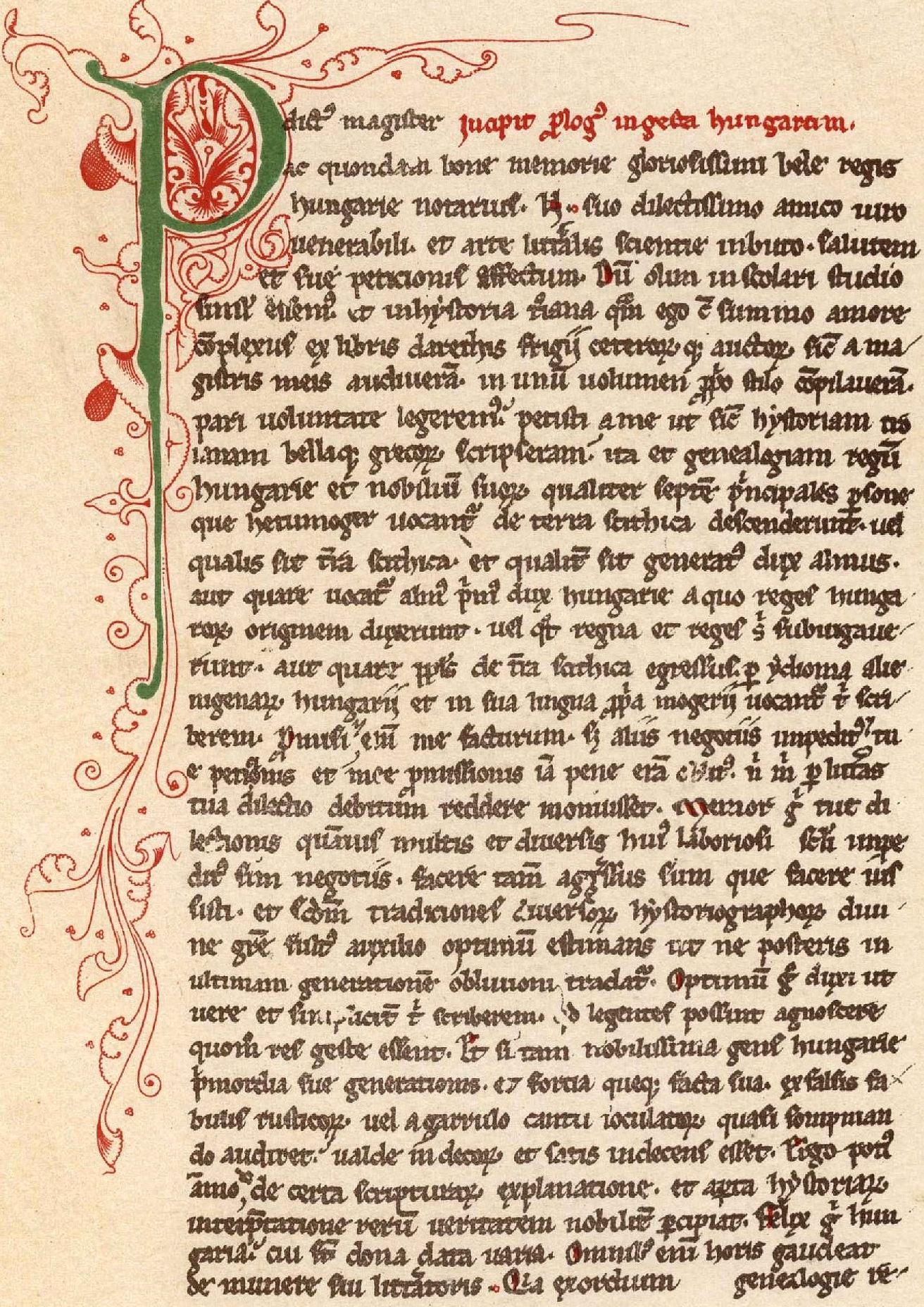
The first page of Gesta Hungarorum – a medieval Hungarian manuscript which is one of the main sources for the Hungarian conquest. However, it mixes ascertainably correct facts, inaccuracies and information that cannot be confirmed from other sources. Some parts are considered by most modern authors as simply inventions (by the author or by his predecessors) to contradict Frankish and other chronicles.

In 913, Simeon launched the first in a series of military campaigns by which he seized from the Byzantines most of the Balkan Peninsula; six years later, he exchanged his title of Great Khan for that of Czar. He was not a man to let the salt mines and gold deposits of southern Transylvania pass into Hungarian hands without a fight. In order to conquer the rest of Transylvania as well as the region between the Maros, Tisza, and Danube rivers ('Glad's domain according to Anonymus, but most likely under Bulgarian rule), the Hungarians would need to ally themselves with the Pechenegs against the Bulgarians. The painful consequences of the alliance of Bulgarians and Pechenegs in 895 were still fresh in the Hungarians' memory. As long as the Pechenegs remained hostile, the Hungarians would not dare to provoke Simeon by seizing his lands north of the Carpathians and the Danube.

The opportunity came with the formation (ca. 932) of a Pecheneg–Hungarian alliance. It is possible that the gyula Bogát had acted earlier, but if not, he must have seized this chance to occupy southern Transylvania. In breaking the Bulgars' resistance, the Hungarians were helped not only by their Pecheneg allies but also by the internal struggle — exacerbated by Byzantine meddling — over the succession to Czar Simeon, who died in 927. This may have presented Bogát's successor, the gyula Zombor, with the opportunity to occupy the land lying between the Maros, Tisza, and Danube rivers.

Having seized southern Transylvania from the Bulgarians, Bogát's warriors and their servants settled down in Slavic villages along the lower reaches of the Küküllő rivers.

The region between the Mureș, Tisa, and Danube rivers must have come under the rule of a Hungarian gyula by 948, for that was when Emperor Constantine recorded that the Bulgarian cities Orșova, Belgrade, and Sirmium lay near Hungary's borders.

It was a sign of the gyulas' enhanced power that they launched the first Hungarian campaigns against Byzantium, cutting through the weakening defenses of the Bulgarians. According to Byzantine chronicles, the first campaign occurred in 934; it ended in a peace treaty between Emperor Peter I of Bulgaria and the Hungarians. Another campaign, in 943, was terminated in similar fashion, and the Byzantines probably had to pay tribute.

In 948, a sudden turn of events compelled Transylvania's gyula to adopt a policy divergent from that of the ruling prince who had dispatched his nephew, and the harka Bulcsú to Constantinople, to renew the peace treaty; the envoys attached so much importance to the task that they had themselves baptized. It is likely that this gesture was motivated by Bulcsú's decision to launch new western raids; therefore he wanted to protect his rear from Byzantine attack. Some time after 952, the gyula Zombor also presented himself at Constantinople, but he came in his own right, and not as an envoy of the ruling prince. He, too, had himself baptized, but his political goal was different from that of Bulcsú. Zombor was interested not in western raids but in the anti-Bulgarian plans of the Byzantine court. The latter had never given up its ambition to crush the Bulgarians and restore the old imperial borders on the Sava and Lower Danube rivers. The gyulas also considered the Bulgarians, from whom they had seized the territories that lay north of the Danube and the Carpathians, to be their principal enemy. The Árpádian ruling princes would have been satisfied with Byzantine neutrality, but the gyulas sought an alliance against the Bulgarians.

== War of 1003 ==
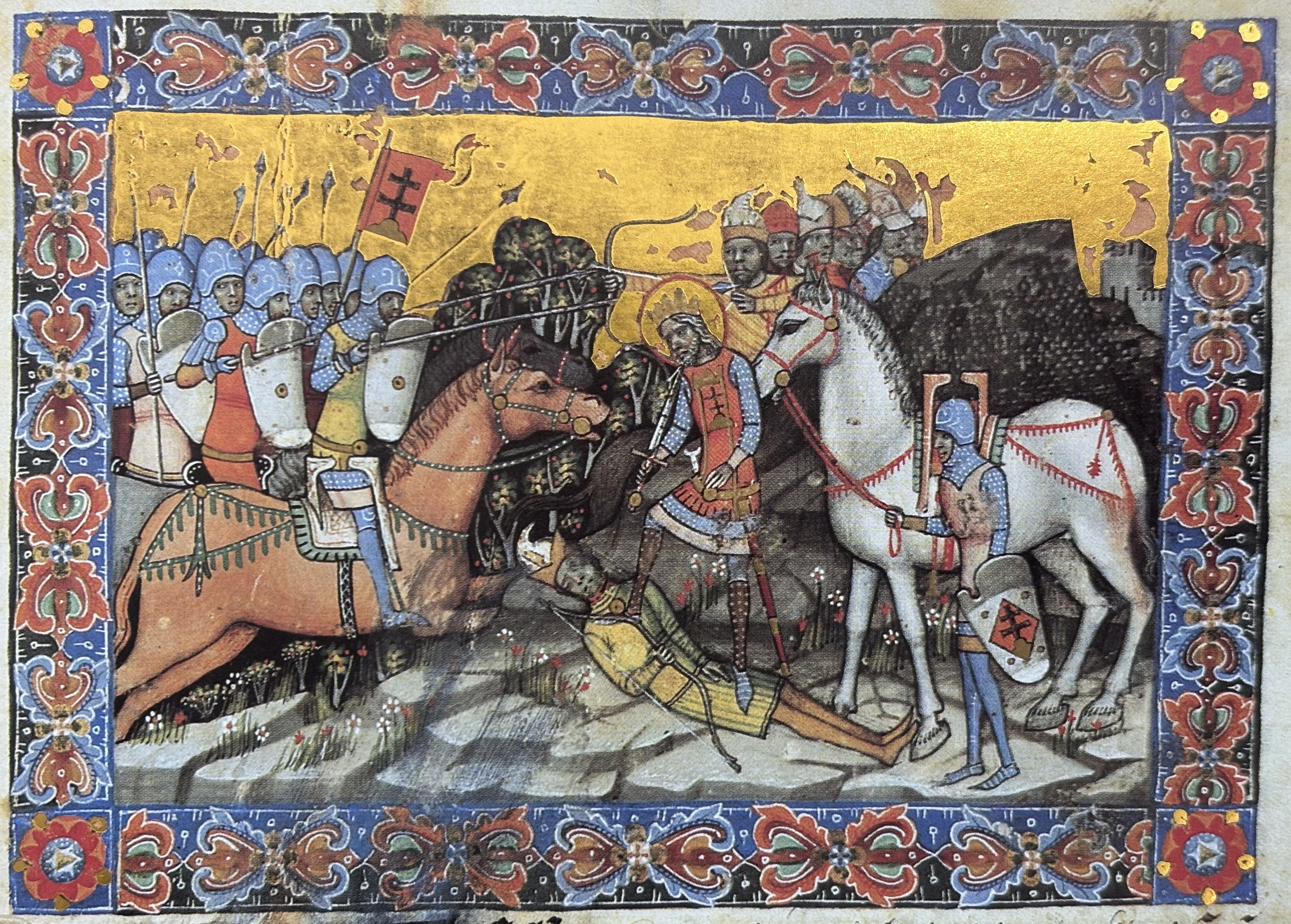
The victory of King Saint Stephen of Hungary over Kean, Duke of the Bulgarians and Slavs (Illuminated Chronicle)

Since the fall of the Bulgarian capital Preslav in 971 the Bulgarian and the Byzantine Empires were in a state of constant war. The Byzantine–Bulgarian conflict reached its height in 1003 with the involvement of Hungary. At that time the governor of the northwestern parts of Bulgaria was Duke Ahtum, the grandson of Duke Glad, who was defeated by the Hungarians in 930s. Ahtum commanded a strong army and firmly defended the northwestern borders of the Empire. He also built many churches and monasteries through which he spread Christianity in Transylvania.

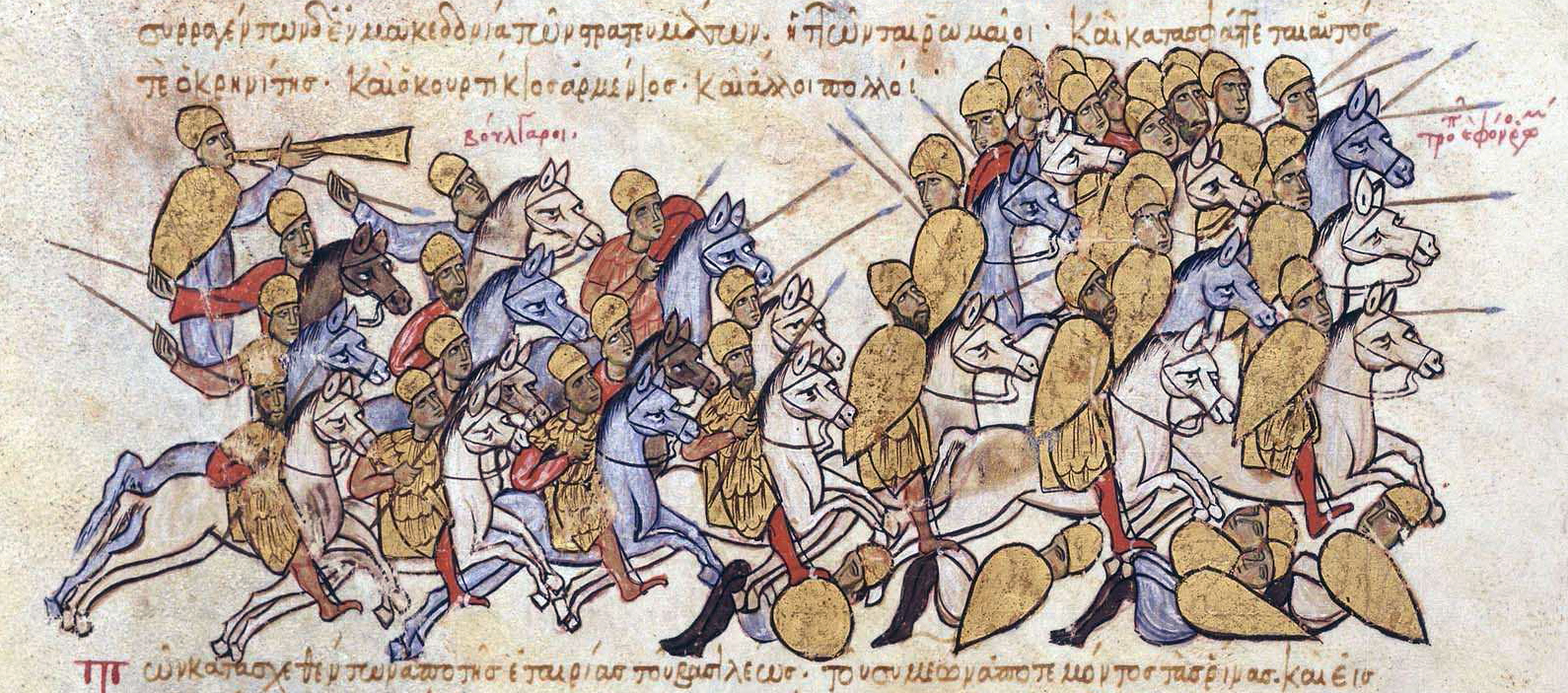
Tsar Symeon I of Bulgaria defeating the Byzantine army, led by Procopius Crenites and Curtacius the Armenian in Macedonia

Although marriage of the heir to the Bulgarian throne Gavril Radomir to the daughter of the Hungarian ruler had established friendly relation between the two strongest states in the Danube area, the relationship deteriorated after Géza's death. The Bulgarians supported Gyula and Koppány as rulers instead of Géza's son Stephen I. As a result of the conflict, the marriage between Gavril Radomir and the Hungarian princess was dissolved. The Hungarians then attacked Ahtum, who had directly backed the pretenders for the Hungarian crown. Stephen I convinced Hanadin, Ahtum's right-hand man, to help in the attack. When the conspiracy was uncovered Hanadin fled and joined the Hungarian forces. At the same time, a strong Byzantine army besieged Vidin, Ahtum's seat. Although many soldiers were required to participate in the defense of the town, Ahtum was occupied with the war to the north. After several months he died in battle when his troops were defeated by the Hungarians. As a result of the war, Bulgarian influence to the northwest of the Danube diminished.

== Conflicts in 13th century ==
Kaloyan of Bulgaria occupied the region between the rivers Cerna and the Olt around 1199. The Kingdom of Hungary was also expanding southwards over the Carpathian Mountains in the early 13th century, which gave rise to conflicts between the two countries. In a letter written in 1203, Tsar Kaloyan informed Pope Innocent III that King Emeric of Hungary had occupied five districts in Bulgaria, and Kaloyan demanded the Pope's intervention. Taking advantage of the civil war between Emeric and his younger brother Andrew in Hungary, Kaloyan invaded and captured Belgrade, Barancs (now Braničevo in Serbia), and other fortresses. Emeric made preparations for a campaign against Bulgaria, but he disbanded his army upon Pope Innocent's demand. The Pope, who had been negotiating a church union with Kaloyan, sent a royal crown to him, but Emeric imprisoned the papal legate who was delivering the crown to Bulgaria when the legate was passing through Hungary.

In the early 1210s, Andrew II occupied Belgrade and Barancs, which had been lost to Bulgaria under Emeric. Andrew's army defeated the Cumans at Vidin. The Cuman tribes dwelling to the east of the Olt as far as the river Siret agreed to pay a yearly tribute to the kings of Hungary in early 1227. Andrew's son, Duke Béla, who administered Transylvania pursued an independent foreign policy since the 1220s. He invaded Bulgaria and besieged Vidin in 1228 or 1232, but he could not capture the fortress. Nevertheless, he captured the fortress of Severin during a military campaign against Bulgaria in 1231. Around the same time, he set up a new border province, the Banate of Severin (Szörény), in the lands between the Carpathians and the Lower Danube. There are conflicting narratives regarding Béla's campaign in the Hungarian and Bulgarian historiography. According to the former, Duke Béla invaded Bulgaria in 1228, possibly because Tsar Ivan Asen II attempted to hinder the conversion of Cumans into Roman Catholicism in the northernmost part of his realm along the border with Hungary. A contingent of Székelys was led by Bogomer Ludány, who was captured during the campaign. Ivan Asen's brother Alexander plundered the surrounding region and tried to block the supply routes of the Hungarian army. Denis Türje led his troops against Alexander's army and achieved several minor victories. According to the Bulgarian historiography, based on the works of Vasil Zlatarski and Petăr Nikov, Béla's invasion took place in the spring of 1232, capturing Belgrade and Barancs and unsuccessfully besieging Vidin. The Hungarians simultaneously stormed into Vlashko (future Wallachia), conquering its western part, where the Banate of Severin was established. Zlatarski considered the latter attack took place in 1233. Vasil Gyuzelev placed the date of Béla's war against Bulgaria at the turn of 1231 and 1232.

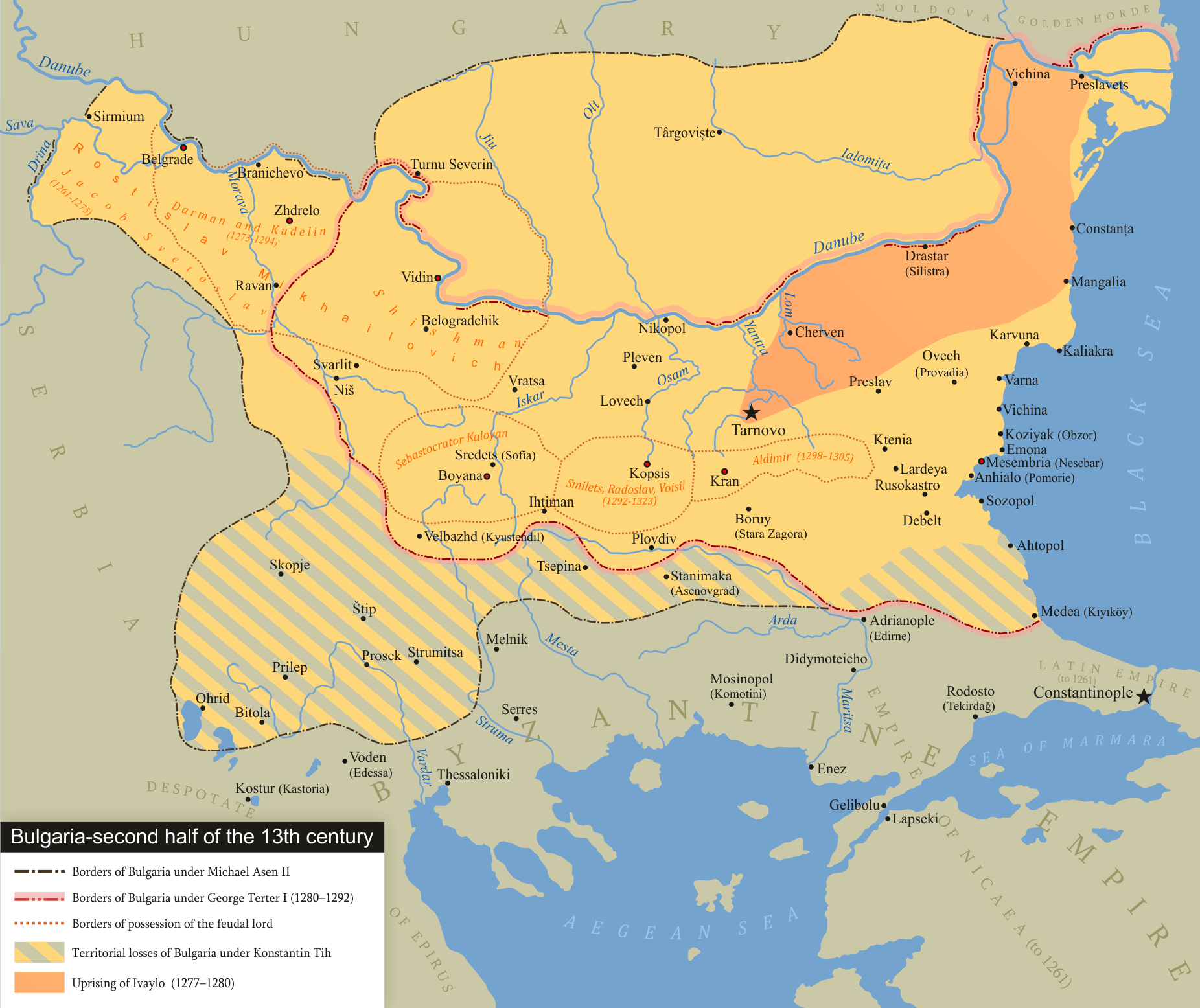
Bulgaria in the second half of the 13th century

Béla IV – now as King of Hungary – forced Tsar Michael II Asen to cede Belgrade and Barancs in 1255. Michael Asen accepted Hungarian suzerainty and married an unidentified daughter of Rostislav Mikhailovich, Duke of Macsó, Béla's son-in-law. Béla IV adopted the title of King of Bulgaria, but he only used it occasionally in the subsequent years. According to historian Dániel Bácsatyai, all four diplomas where this title appears are objectionable in terms of authenticity. In late 1256, Michael Asen was assassinated by a group of boyars, who installed his first cousin, Kaliman as the new ruler of Bulgaria. To further his claims, Kaliman forcibly married Michael's widow, the daughter of Rostislav, but he could not consolidate power and was killed almost immediately. To protect his daughter, Rostislav now, early in 1257, invaded Bulgaria with Hungarian reinforcements; it seems he was using her as an excuse to acquire the Bulgarian throne for himself. He appeared at the gates of Tărnovo and recovered his daughter; though it is sometimes stated that he briefly seized Tărnovo, but it seems that he probably never actually gained possession of the city. Rostislav retreated to Vidin where he established himself, taking the title of Tsar of Bulgaria (Latin: imperator Bulgarorum), and the Hungarians recognized him with this title. Opposing to Rostislav's claim, Mitso then a boyar, Konstantin Tih were proclaimed tsar too in Tărnovo. Rostislav Mikhailovich invaded Bulgaria with Hungarian assistance in the summer of 1259. Béla's eldest son and heir Stephen, Duke of Styria entrusted his confidant Csák Hahót to lead the Hungarian auxiliary troops consisted of knights from Zala County. The outcome of the campaign is uncertain, and the Hungarians achieved only moderate success (next year, some Bulgarians had participated in the Battle of Kressenbrunn).

In the following year (1260), Rostislav left the Balkan Peninsula to join the campaign of his father-in-law, Béla IV against Bohemia. Taking advantage of Rostislav's absence, Konstantin Tih broke into his realm and reoccupied Vidin. He also sent an army to attack the Banate of Severin, but the arriving Hungarian commander, Lawrence, son of Kemény, fought the invaders off. Lawrence ordered the hanging of several Bulgarian prisoners of war along the Danube. Following the defeat at Kressenbrunn, after which the Hungarians were forced to renounce Styria in favor of Ottokar II of Bohemia, Stephen was re-installed as Duke of Transylvania. In a retaliation for Konstantin's previous attack, Béla IV and Stephen jointly invaded Bulgaria in the spring of 1261. Hungarian troops stormed into Bulgaria under the command of Duke Stephen himself. They recaptured Vidin and besieged Lom on the Lower Danube, but they were unable to bring Konstantin to a pitched battle, because he withdrew to Tărnovo. The Hungarian army left Bulgaria before the end of the year, but the campaign restored northwestern Bulgaria to Rostislav. Dániel Bácsatyai considers the military expedition perhaps ended only in the first half of 1262.

Rostislav died in 1262. Stephen's relationship with his father Béla IV deteriorated in the early 1260s. Following a brief skirmish in the autumn of 1262, Stephen forced his father to cede all the lands of the Kingdom of Hungary to the east of the Danube to him – including Transylvania and Severin – and adopted the title of younger king. Thereafter, Stephen pursued an independent foreign policy, affecting the Bulgarian–Hungarian affairs too. A Bulgarian nobleman, Despot Jacob Svetoslav sought assistance from Stephen after his domains, which were situated in the regions south of Vidin, were overrun by Byzantine troops in the second half of 1263. Stephen sent reinforcements under the command of Ladislaus Kán, Voivode of Transylvania to Bulgaria. The Voivode routed the Byzantines and drove them out of Bulgaria. Crossing the border, another Hungarian knight Alexander Karászi fought with his own army corps and gained victories in "Greek land". Stephen granted Vidin to Jacob Svetoslav who accepted his suzerainty. The conflict of Béla IV and Stephen sparked into a civil war in late 1264. In response, fearing Bulgarian retribution and lack of Hungarian support should Béla IV come out victorious, Jacob Svetoslav submitted himself to Tsar Konstantin Tih in early 1265. They crossed the Danube and raided the Hungarian fortresses north of the river, which belonged to Stephen's realm. Stephen routed his father's army in the Battle of Isaszeg in March 1265, ending the civil war. Following their peace, younger king Stephen invaded Bulgaria in the summer of 1266, as a punitive expedition for Jacob Svetoslav's betrayal and the Bulgarians' attack during the civil war. He routed the Bulgarians in five battles; his confidant Egidius Monoszló led Stephen's army to besiege Tărnovo and plundering the surrounding areas. Meanwhile, the main army seized Vidin and other forts, while another army commanded by Gregory Péc defeated the Bulgarians in Vrchov. Panyit Miskolc was entrusted to lead an army which successfully besieged and occupied Pleven. The campaign resulted in Jacob Svetoslav again accepting Stephen's suzerainty and was reinstalled in Vidin, while Stephen began to use the title "King of Bulgaria" in his charters thereafter. Historian Dániel Bácsatyai, who considered that the civil war between Béla IV and Stephen took place in 1267, presented an alternative chronology of the events. He argued the Hungarians invaded the Byzantine Empire at the turn of 1264 and 1265, in the same time when thousand of Tatars and the army of Konstantin Tih crossed the frozen Lower Danube to invade the realm of Michael VIII Palaiologos. According to Bácsatyai, Stephen's attack against Bulgaria took place in 1269, after Jacob Svetoslav's betrayal in the previous year. He connected the events with the parallel unsuccessful attack of the Serbs against the Duchy of Macsó in 1268 or early 1269. The historian saw the efforts of Emperor Michael VIII to sever the Balkan states from the sphere of influence of the Kingdom of Hungary behind both events.

The death of Stephen V in 1272 meant that he was succeeded by his infant son Ladislaus IV, with the widowed consort and mother of the boy, Elizabeth, as his regent. At the time, Jacob Svetoslav still held Vidin as a Hungarian vassal. The Kingdom of Hungary fell into constant feudal anarchy, when baronial groups fought for supreme power, which has led to the marginalization of foreign policy towards Bulgaria for decades to come. Possibly in 1273, Hungarian rule in Barancs, west of Jacob Svetoslav's domain, was put to an end by two Cuman–Bulgarian nobles, Darman and Kudelin. Cut off from his Hungarian suzerains and facing the menace of a Bulgarian attack from the east, Jacob Svetoslav once again submitted to Bulgarian rule. Queen Elizabeth, who administered Macsó since 1279, had sent troops to claim Barancs in 1282–1284, but her forces were repelled and her vassal lands plundered in retaliation. Elizabeth's successor, Stephen Dragutin invaded Barancs with Hungarian assistance in the second half of 1284 or early 1285, but could not defeat the brothers. The Hungarian auxiliary troops, consisted of Transylvanian and Cuman contingents, were led by George Baksa after a failed negotiation attempt between Ladislaus IV and Darman near the Hungarian–Serbian border.

== Conflicts in 14th century ==
- Hungarian occupation of Vidin

== See also ==
- Bulgaria-Hungary relations
- History of Hungary
