= Nikolova =

Nikolova may refer to:

- The feminine of the Bulgarian surname Nikolov
- 12386 Nikolova, a Main-belt Asteroid
