= Boris Chernev =

Bulgarian actor (1964–2009)

- Born: 19 July 1964; Sofia, Bulgaria
- Died: 6 April 2009 (aged 44); Sofia, Bulgaria
- Occupation: Actor
- Years active: 1987–2009

Boris Petrov Chernev (Bulgarian: Борис Петров Чернев; 19 July 1964 – 6 April 2009) was a Bulgarian actor. He is best known for dubbing into Bulgarian roles in television series.

== Early life ==
His father is the actor Petar Chernev (1934-1993).

== Career ==
=== Acting ===
In 1990 Chernev graduated from VITIZ with a degree in acting for dramatic theatre in Nikolay Lutzkanov's class. He worked for the Pazardzhik theatre, and later he joined the "Studio 313" theatre. As a student he performed in radio plays of Bulgarian National Radio under the direction of Iliana Benovska.

=== Voice acting ===
Chernev started doing voice-overs for films, television series and commercials in 1990s, when he was invited to the Bulgarian National Television by dubbing director Maria Nikolova. He did voice-overs on films which were released in Bulgaria on VHS by Multi Video Center, IP Video and Videocom.

On 25 June 2005 he was elected chairman of the Guild of the Actors, who work in dubbing.

During his voice-over career he often worked alongside Vasil Binev and Nikolay Nikolov, starred in dubbing studios like Nova Television and Diema. Some of his films, that he had completed, were released on television posthumously. These include 13 Going on 30 (2004), The Jackal (1997), Passionada (2002), and his last film was Billy Elliot (2000), released on Nova Television on April 19, 2009.

== Awards ==
In 2005, Chernev was nominated for the Icarus award in the category "Golden Voice" for his work on the TV series O Clone and Frasier.

In 2006, he was nominated for the Icarus award category "Golden Voice" for Nip/Tuck and Lost.

In 2007, he was nominated for the Icarus award category "Golden Voice" for Prison Break and Lost.

== Death ==
Boris Chernev died suddenly of an illness on April 6, 2009.
