= Nikola Nikolov =

Nikola Nikolov may refer to:

- Nikola Koev Nikolov (Mamin Kolyu) (1880–1961), Bulgarian revolutionary of the Internal Macedonian-Adrianopolitan Revolutionary Organization (IMARO)
- Nikola Nikolov (footballer) (1908–1996), Bulgarian international footballer
- Nikola Nikolov (opera singer) (1925–2007), Bulgarian opera singer
- Nikola Dinev Nikolov (1953–2019), Bulgarian heavyweight Greco-Roman wrestler

== See also ==
- Nikolay Nikolov (disambiguation)
- bg:Никола Николов, a more extensive list in Bulgarian Wikipedia
