= Plamen Nikolov =

Plamen Nikolov may refer to:

- Plamen Nikolov (footballer, born 1957)
- Plamen Nikolov (footballer, born 1961)
- Plamen Nikolov (footballer, born 1985)
- Plamen Nikolov (politician)
