= Leo Choirosphaktes =

Byzantine official

Leo Choirosphaktes, sometimes Latinized as Choerosphactes (Ancient Greek: Λέων Χοιροσφάκτης) and also known as Leo Magistros or Leo Magister, was a Byzantine official who rose to high office under Emperor Basil I the Macedonian (r. 867–886) and served as an envoy under Emperor Leo VI the Wise (r. 886–912) to Bulgaria and the Abbasid Caliphate. Choirosphaktes was also a well-educated and prominent scholar and writer, many of whose works and correspondence survive.

== Biography ==
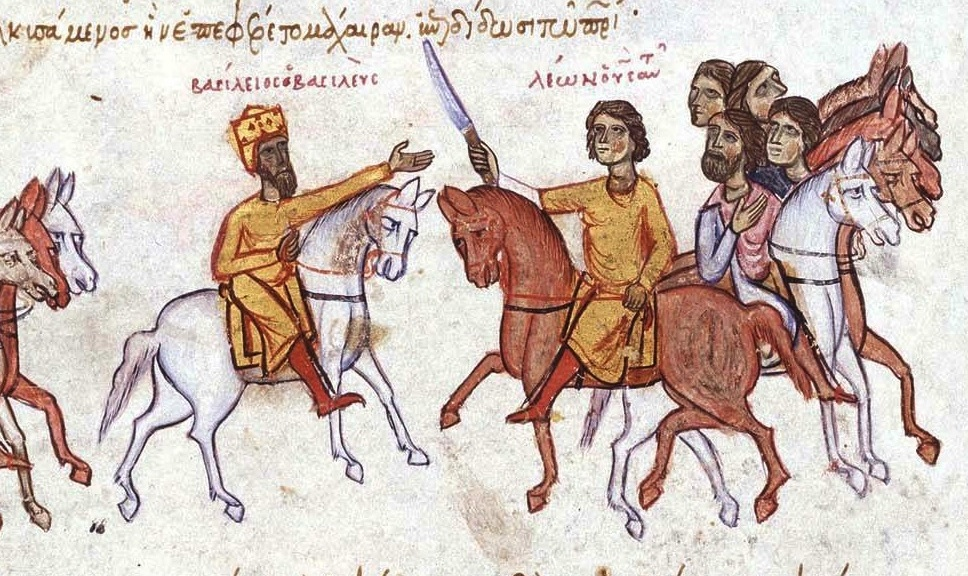
Basil I (left) and the young Leo VI (right), miniature from the Madrid Skylitzes.

The date of Choirosphaktes's birth is not clear; George Kolias placed it between 845 and 850, while Hans Georg Beck circa 824. Paul Magdalino, however, rejects a birth date in the 820s, for Choirosphaktes was still alive in 913 and probably died after 920. His family came from the Peloponnese and was well established in aristocratic circles. Through his wife, he was apparently a relative of Zoe Karbonopsina, Emperor Leo VI's mistress after circa 903 and eventual fourth wife, and he himself married a lady related to the Byzantine imperial family, with whom he had two daughters.

Nothing is known of Choirosphaktes's early life before circa 865, when he dedicated a major theological work, the Theology in a Thousand Lines (Χιλιόστιχος Θεολογία) to Emperor Michael III (r. 842–867). Under Michael's successor, Basil I the Macedonian, Choirosphaktes rose to high state offices, being named mystikos (the first attested holder of the post) and kanikleios, both confidential positions in close proximity to the emperor.

Choirosphaktes continued to be favoured by Basil's son and successor, Leo VI, who awarded him the high dignities of anthypatos, magistros, and patrikios by 896. In 895–896, Emperor Leo sent Choirosphaktes in a series of embassies to the Bulgarian ruler Symeon (r. 893–927), to conclude the ongoing war between the two states. His surviving diplomatic correspondence is a valuable source for these events.

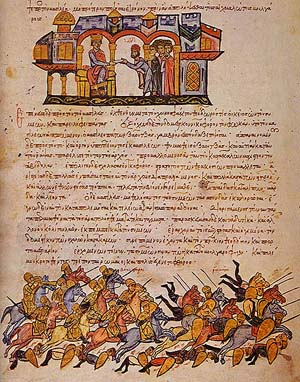
The Bulgarians routing the Byzantine forces at Bulgarophygon in 896. From the Madrid Skylitzes.

The Bulgarians had been hard pressed due to the successful raids of the Magyars, allies of Byzantium, who had taken many prisoners and handed them over to the Byzantines. Confident of a favourable settlement after this, Leo stood down the Byzantine forces, but Symeon, once relieved of pressure on two fronts, immediately imprisoned Choirosphaktes, and carried on negotiations with him in his cell. These Symeon dragged out until his own allies, the Pechenegs, attacked the Magyars in the rear. After the Magyars were defeated, the Bulgarian ruler issued an ultimatum demanding the release of all Bulgarian prisoners as a precondition of peace. Emperor Leo, pressed at the same time by the Arabs in the East, accepted his demand. Choirosphaktes returned to Constantinople with the Bulgarian envoy Theodore, and the prisoners were released. Soon, however, hostilities resumed, and after a severe Byzantine defeat at the Battle of Bulgarophygon in summer 896, Choirosphaktes was again dispatched to Symeon. He managed to negotiate a treaty (either in late 896 or in 897), which set free a large number of Byzantine prisoners (Choirosphaktes himself speaks in his letters of 120,000, certainly an exaggeration), and secured peace in exchange for the restoration of Bulgaria's trade privileges, the payment of an annual tribute by the Byzantines to Symeon, and some border concessions.

That peace would last until 913, with the exception of a brief moment in 904, when, in the aftermath of a series of Byzantine setbacks at the hands of the Arabs—most notably the sack of Thessalonica, the Byzantine Empire's second city—Symeon decided to press his advantage: he appeared with his army in front of Thessalonica, and demanded concessions in return for not occupying the defenseless city. Choirosphaktes again was the Byzantine ambassador sent to negotiate with him. Symeon secured much territory in Macedonia and Thrace, although Choirosphaktes also managed to recover a belt of about 30 fortresses around the Byzantine Empire's Adriatic stronghold of Dyrrhachium (historian Shaun Tougher, in his study of Leo VI's reign, considers the latter the result of a separate mission in circa 902–903).

In 905/906, Emperor Leo sent Choirosphaktes as an envoy to the emirs of Tarsos and Melitene, as well as to the Abbasid court in Baghdad, hoping to achieve a peace treaty, but also to gather grants of economy by the eastern patriarchs for the emperor's fourth marriage, normally forbidden by canon law. Shortly after his return, circa 907, Choirosphaktes fell into disfavour and was exiled to a location called Petra, possibly indicating some involvement in the contemporary revolt of Andronikos Doukas. During this period of disgrace, he sent repeated letters to the emperor pleading his case. He was also the subject of a vehement attack by the bishop Arethas of Caesarea in the latter's work Choirosphaktes or Wizard-hater (Μισογόης), where he was accused of being a "Hellene" (a term identical to "pagan"). Eventually, he was pardoned and rehabilitated, either by Emperor Leo himself or by his brother and successor, Alexander (r. 912–913), for at the time of Alexander's death he was back in Constantinople, and was implicated in the conspiracy and failed coup d'état of the general Constantine Doukas. Following the coup's suppression, Choirosphaktes sought sanctuary in the Hagia Sophia. There he was captured, tonsured, and then confined to the Monastery of Stoudios, where he died shortly after 919.

== Writings and ideas ==
Alongside his letters, Choirosphaktes also composed theological works, hymns, and epigrams. The attribution of some of the works, however, is disputed. Among them are many celebratory anacreontic poems: two on one of the marriages (probably the second one) of Leo VI, one on a new palace bath built by the same emperor, one on the marriage of Emperor Constantine VII with Helena Lekapene in 920, and poems on the deaths of prominent figures of his time, such as Leo the Mathematician and the patriarchs Photios and Stephen I. Throughout his works, Choirosphaktes praises the intellectual qualities of his heroes, especially Leo VI, draws parallels between the absolute rule of God and the imperial autocracy of Byzantium, and notably marginalizes the role of the Church, promoting even elements of the rejected iconoclasm. Paul Magdalino has argued that he was advocating a new "ideology, indeed theology of rulership", where all power is concentrated in the hands of a "small secular elite of court philosophers", in direct contravention of the prevailing model of interrelation between Church and state.

=== Editions ===
- Léon Choerosphactès, magistre, proconsul et patrice: biographie, correspondance [avec lettres de Syméon, prince de Bulgarie, du magistre Genesios, du questeur Anastase, du patrice Thomas et du spathaire Procope I], text and French translation by Georgios Kolias, Athens 1939.
- Chiliostichos Theologia: editio princeps, text, commentary and German translation by Ioannis Vassis, Supplementa Byzantina 6, Berlin and New York 2002.
- L'anacreontica De thermis di Leone Magistro, ed. by C. Gallavotti, Accademia nazionale dei Lincei, Bollettino dei classici, 3rd series, 11 (1990), pp. 78–103.
- Cinque poeti bizantini: Anacreontee dal Barberiniano greco 310, text, commentary and Italian translation by Federica Ciccolella, Amsterdam 2003.
- Corrispondenza; introduzione, testo critico, traduzione e note di commento, text, commentary, and Italian translation by Gioacchino Strano, Catania: Centro studi sull'antico cristianesimo, Università di Catania, 2008.

== Sources ==
- Beck, Hans Georg (1959). Kirche und Theologische Literatur im Byzantinischen Reich. Munich: Beck.
- Fine, John V. A. Jr. (1991) [1983]. The Early Medieval Balkans: A Critical Survey from the Sixth to the Late Twelfth Century. Ann Arbor: University of Michigan Press. ISBN 0-472-08149-7.
- Guilland, Rodolphe (1967). Recherches sur les institutions byzantines [Studies on the Byzantine Institutions]. Berliner byzantinische Arbeiten 35 (in French). Vol. 2. Berlin and Amsterdam: Akademie-Verlag & Adolf M. Hakkert. OCLC 878894516.
- Kazhdan, Alexander, ed. (1991). The Oxford Dictionary of Byzantium. Oxford and New York: Oxford University Press. ISBN 0-19-504652-8.
- Kolias, George (1939). Léon Choerosphaktès, Magistre, Proconsul et Patrice. Athens.
- Lilie, Ralph-Johannes; Ludwig, Claudia; Pratsch, Thomas; Zielke, Beate (2000). Prosopographie der mittelbyzantinischen Zeit: 1. Abteilung (641–867), Band 3: Leon (# 4271) – Placentius (# 6265) (in German). Berlin and Boston: De Gruyter. pp. 72–73. ISBN 978-3-11-016673-6.
- Magdalino, Paul (2004). "In Search of the Byzantine Courtier: Leo Choirosphaktes and Constantine Manasses". In Maguire, Henry (ed.). Byzantine Court Culture from 829 to 1204. Washington, DC: Dumbarton Oaks. pp. 141–166. ISBN 978-0-88402-308-1.
- Tougher, Shaun (1997). The Reign of Leo VI (886-912): Politics and People. Leiden: Brill. ISBN 978-9-00-410811-0.
