= Battle of Boulgarophygon =

896 conflict between the Byzantine and First Bulgarian empires

Coordinates: 41°26′N 27°06′E

- Part of the Byzantine–Bulgarian wars: War of 894–896
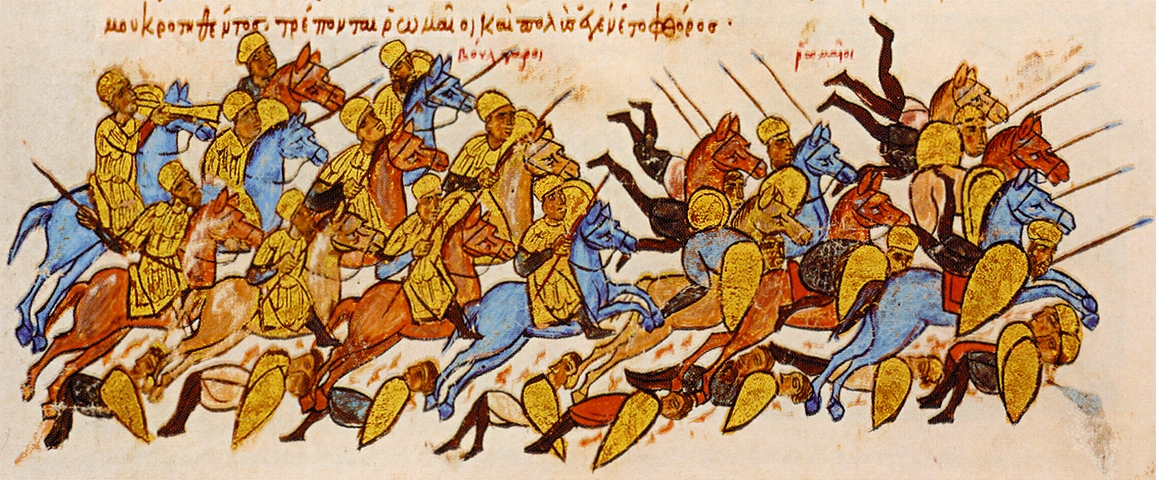
- The Bulgarians rout the Byzantine army at Boulgarophygon, miniature from the Madrid Skylitzes
| Date | Summer of 896 |
| Location | Boulgarophygon, Thrace |
| Result | Bulgarian victory |

Belligerents
| Bulgarian Empire | Byzantine Empire |

Commanders and leaders
| Simeon I of Bulgaria | Leo Katakalon |

Strength
| Unknown | Unknown |

Casualties and losses
| Light | Almost the entire army |

The Battle of Boulgarophygon (Bulgarian: Битка при Булгарофигон; Medieval Greek: Μάχη του Βουλγαρόφυγου) was fought in the summer of 896 near the town of Boulgarophygon (modern Babaeski, Turkey) between the Byzantine Empire and the First Bulgarian Empire. The result was an annihilation of the Byzantine army which determined the Bulgarian victory in the trade war of 894–896.

Despite the initial difficulties in the war against the Magyars, who acted as Byzantine allies, the battle of Boulgarophygon proved to be the first decisive victory of the young and ambitious Bulgarian ruler Simeon I against the Byzantine Empire. Simeon would go on to inflict a number of defeats on the Byzantines in pursuit of his ultimate goal, the throne in Constantinople. The peace treaty that was signed as a result of the battle confirmed the Bulgarian domination in the Balkans.

== Background ==
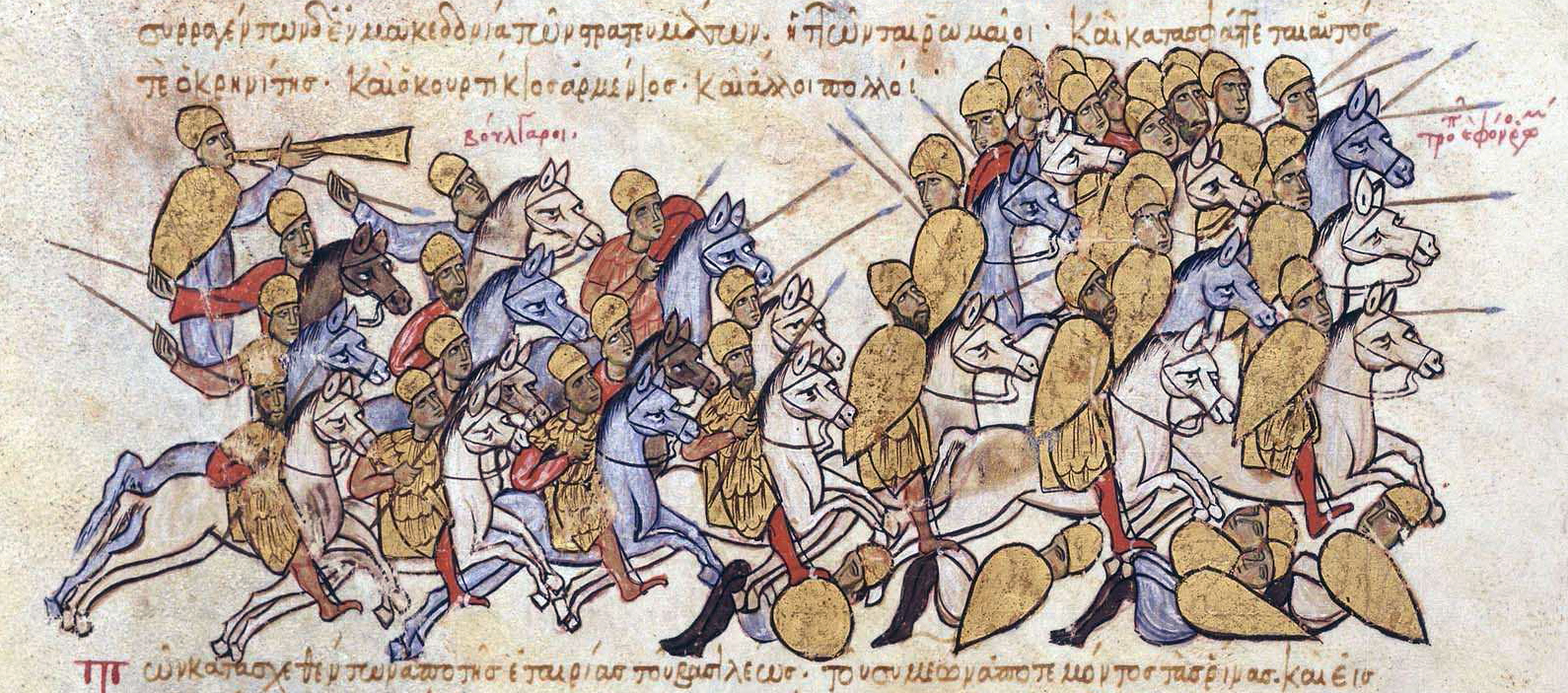
The Bulgarians defeat the Byzantines under Krenites and Kourtikios in Thrace, miniature from the Madrid Skylitzes

During the rule of Boris I (r. 852–889), Bulgaria underwent major changes – the Christianization of the country and the admission of the disciples of Saints Cyril and Methodius, which marked the beginning of the creation and consolidation of the medieval Bulgarian literature and alphabet. Despite a number of military setbacks against most neighbouring countries, Boris I managed to preserve Bulgarian territorial integrity. During the Council of Preslav in 893, assembled after the unsuccessful attempt of Boris I's eldest son Vladimir-Rasate to restore Paganism, it was decided that Old Bulgarian was to replace Greek as a language of the church and the Byzantine clergy was to be banished and replaced with Bulgarians. The Council sealed Boris I's ambitions for cultural and religious independence and calmed down the concerns among the nobility, who feared any strong Byzantine influence in the internal affairs of Bulgaria. It was also decided that his third son Simeon, born after the Christianization and called child of peace, was to become the next Prince of Bulgaria.

These events ruined the Byzantine hopes to exert influence over the newly Christianized country, and Emperor Leo VI (r. 886–912) soon had a chance to retaliate. Some members of the Byzantine court had an interest in moving the market of the Bulgarian goods from Constantinople to Thessaloniki, which meant that the Bulgarian merchants would have to pay higher taxes. That move affected not only private interests but also the international commercial importance of Bulgaria, regulated with the Byzantine–Bulgarian Treaty of 716. The ousting of the merchants from Constantinople, which was a major destination of trade routes from all over Europe and Asia, was a heavy blow for Bulgarian economic interests. The merchants complained to Simeon I, who in turn raised the issue with Leo VI, but the appeal was left unanswered. Simeon, who was seeking a pretext to declare war and begin implementing his plans, launched an invasion of Byzantine Thrace, resulting in what has sometimes been called the first commercial war in Europe.

=== Magyar intervention ===
The Byzantines hastily assembled a large army under the generals Prokopios Krenites and Kourtikios, which included the Imperial Guard that consisted of Khazar mercenaries. In the ensuing battle in the Theme of Macedonia (modern Eastern Thrace), probably around Adrianople, the Byzantines were defeated and their commanders perished. Most of the Khazars were captured and Simeon had their noses cut and "sent them in the capital for shame of the Romans [i.e the Byzantines]".

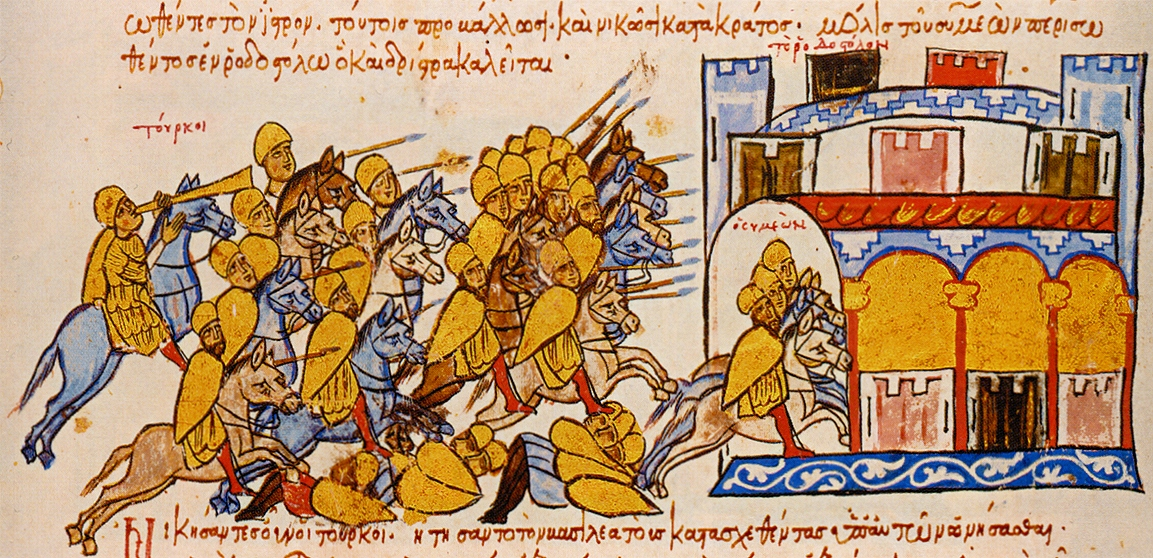
The Magyars pursue Simeon I to Drastar, miniature from the Madrid Skylitzes note that the Magyars are named above the army Tourkoi (Turks)

Since the main Byzantine forces were engaged in the east against the Arabs, Leo VI turned to the well-tried methods of Byzantine diplomacy and sent envoys with rich gifts to the Magyars, who in that time inhabited the steppes to the north-east of Bulgaria. When Simeon I refused to conclude peace and imprisoned the Byzantine envoy Konstantinakios, at the end of 894 the Byzantine navy was used to ferry the Magyars across the Danube, despite the fact that the Bulgarians had barred the river with chains and ropes. Simeon I, who was at the Byzantine-Bulgarian border facing the general Nikephoros Phokas, had to march northwards to confront them. His army was defeated by the Magyars somewhere in Dobruja and Simeon himself had to flee to the strong fortress Drastar. The Magyars looted and pillaged unopposed, reaching the outskirts of the capital Preslav, and after they sold the captives to the Byzantines they retreated to the north of the Danube. Then Simeon pretended that he wanted to negotiate and put forward the issue of prisoner exchange. The Byzantines sent Leo Choirosphaktes in Preslav to negotiate the terms. As Simeon needed time to address the Magyar threat, he deliberately prolonged the negotiations and Choirosphaktes was repeatedly refused an audience. In the meantime Simeon allied with the Pechenegs, while the people even appealed to his father Boris I, who had become a monk, to assume the command of the army. In the decisive battle the Magyars suffered a devastating defeat, but the victorious Bulgarians were themselves said to have lost 20,000 riders. That was the only victory on the battlefield Boris I ever achieved. As a result of this defeat, the Magyars had to move westwards and settle in Pannonia, where they later established the Kingdom of Hungary.

== Battle ==
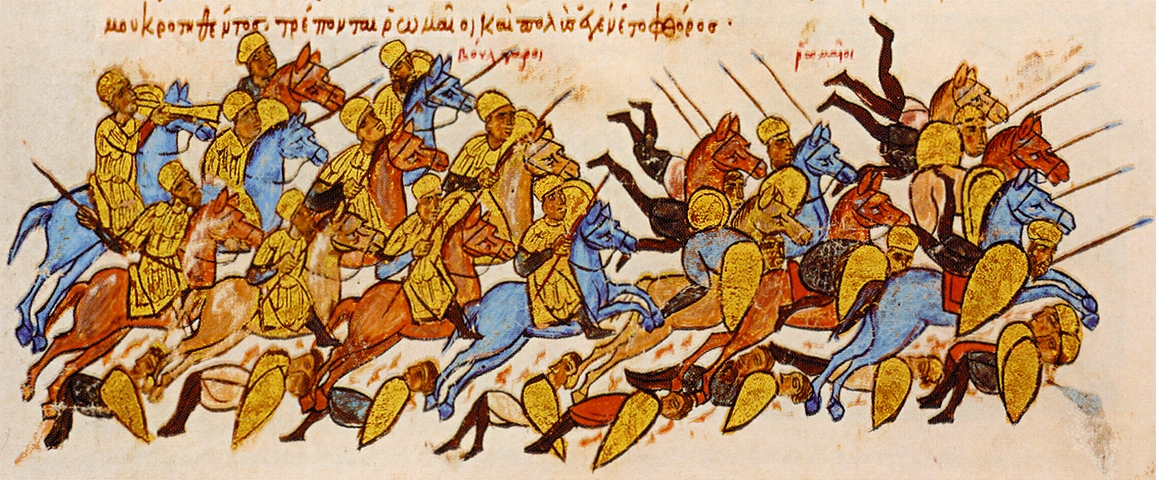
The Bulgarians rout the Byzantine army at Boulgarophygon, miniature from the Madrid Skylitzes

When Simeon I returned to Preslav "proud of the victory", he broke the negotiations with Choirosphaktes and once again invaded Byzantine Thrace, further encouraged by the death of the capable general Nikephoros Phokas. The Byzantines transferred "all themes and tagmata", i. e. all forces that were fighting the Arabs, to Europe. The army was commanded by the Domestic of the Schools Leo Katakalon, who lacked the ability of Phokas. The two armies clashed at Boulgarophygon in the summer of 896 and the Byzantines were thoroughly routed. A Byzantine historian wrote:

...the Romans were decisively defeated all down the line and they all perished.

Among the casualties was the protovestiarios Theodosius, the second-in-command of the army, while Leo Katakalon managed to escape with a few other survivors. The Byzantine defeat was so grave that one of their soldiers retired from society and became an ascetic under the name of Luke the Stylite.

Gaining the upper hand, Simeon I led the Bulgarian troops to Constantinople, burning villages en route. According to the Muslim historian al-Tabari, Leo VI was desperate after the consecutive refusals of peace, and was forced to gather an army of Arab prisoners of war and send them against the Bulgarians with the promise of freedom. The Bulgarians were stopped just outside Constantinople and Simeon I agreed to negotiate.

== Aftermath ==
The war ended with a peace treaty which formally lasted until around Leo VI's death in 912, and under which Byzantium was obliged to pay Bulgaria an annual tribute in exchange for the return of allegedly 120,000 captured Byzantine soldiers and civilians. Under the treaty, the Byzantines also ceded an area between the Black Sea and Strandzha to the Bulgarian Empire, while the Bulgarians also promised not to invade Byzantine territory.

Simeon I was content with the results and considered that he had superiority over the Byzantine Empire. Despite the success, he realized that there was still a lot to do before prevailing over the Empire for good. He needed his own political and ideological base, and he consequently launched an ambitious construction program in Preslav so that it could rival Constantinople. In the meanwhile, Simeon I had also imposed his authority over Serbia in return for recognizing Petar Gojniković as its ruler. That was an important move towards reducing Byzantine influence over the Western Balkans.

Simeon also learned the lesson of how vulnerable Bulgaria was to the northern tribes neighbouring his realm, when they were influenced by Byzantine diplomacy. That experience paid off in 917, when Simeon managed to counter the Byzantine efforts to ally with the Serbs or the Pechenegs, and forced them to fight alone in the battle of Achelous, where the Byzantines were soundly defeated in one of the biggest disasters in Byzantine history.

== Sources ==
- Andreev, Jordan; Milcho Lalkov (1996). The Bulgarian Khans and Tsars (in Bulgarian). Veliko Tarnovo: Abagar. ISBN 954-427-216-X.
- Obolensky, Dimitri (1974) [1971]. The Byzantine Commonwealth: Eastern Europe, 500-1453. London: Cardinal. ISBN 978-0-351-17644-9.
- Peychev, Atanas; collective (1984). 1300 Years On Guard (in Bulgarian). Sofia: Voenno Izdatelstvo.
- Runciman, Steven (1930). "The Two Eagles". A History of the First Bulgarian Empire. London: George Bell & Sons. OCLC 832687.
- Whittow, Mark (1996). The Making of Byzantium (600–1025). Los Angeles: University of California Press. ISBN 0-520-20497-2.
- Zlatarski, Vasil (1971) [1927]. История на българската държава през средните векове. Том I. История на Първото българско царство, Част II. От славянизацията на държавата до падането на Първото царство (852—1018) [History of Bulgaria in the Middle Ages. Vol. 1. History of the First Bulgarian Empire, Part 2.From the Slavicization of the state to the fall of the First Empire (852—1018)]. Sofia: Nauka i izkustvo. OCLC 67080314.
