= Boris Nikolov =

Boris Nikolov may refer to:

- Boris Nikolov (footballer), Bulgarian footballer
- Boris Nikolov (boxer) (1929–2017), Bulgarian boxer
