= Lyudmil Nikolov =

Bulgarian footballer

Personal information
- Full name: Lyudmil Aleksandrov Nikolov
- Date of birth: 27 August 1984 (age 42)
- Place of birth: Plovdiv, Bulgaria
- Height: 1.86 m (6 ft 1 in)
- Position: Centre-back

Team information
- Current team: Brestnik 1948
- Number: 4

Senior career*
Years	Team	Apps	(Gls)
2003–2005	Maritsa Plovdiv		
2005–2008	Spartak Plovdiv	64	(2)
2008–2010	Loko Plovdiv	12	(0)
2010	Sportist Svoge		
2010–	Brestnik 1948		
- * Club domestic league appearances and goals as of 30 June 2009

Lyudmil Nikolov (Bulgarian: Людмил Николов) (born 27 August 1984) is a Bulgarian football player, who plays for Brestnik 1948 as a defender. Nikolov is a right and central defender.

- Height - 1.86 m.
- Weight - 84 kg.

== Career ==
His first club is a Maritsa Plovdiv. Between 2005 and 2008 he played for Spartak Plovdiv. Nikolov signed a 3-year deal with Lokomotiv Plovdiv after being released from Spartak Plovdiv in 2008. In his first season in Lokomotiv, Nikolov earned 12 appearances playing in the A PFG.
