= Plamen Nikolov (politician) =

Bulgarian politician

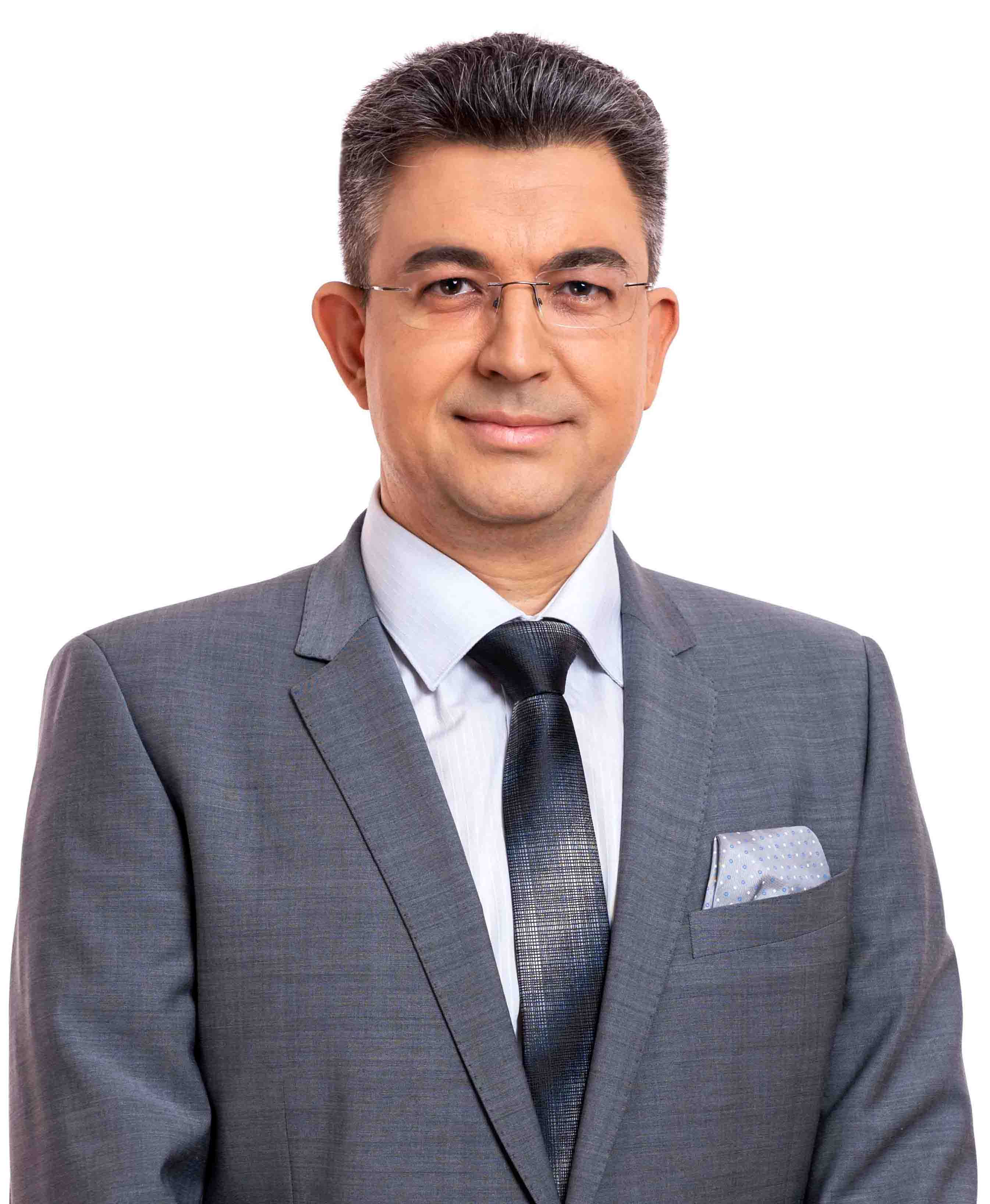
Portrait of Plamen Nikolov

Plamen Nikolov (Bulgarian: Пламен Николов; born 1977) is a Bulgarian businessman who was the prime minister-designate of Bulgaria, following the victory of There Is Such a People in the July 2021 Bulgarian parliamentary election. He has no prior political experience. On August 6, There is Such a People announced its intention to form a minority government, with Nikolov as prime minister. On August 10, Nikolov's candidacy was withdrawn after being unable to secure support.

== Before politics ==
Nikolov was born in Gorna Oryahovitsa in Veliko Tarnovo Province in 1977. After studying at University of Klagenfurt in Austria, Nikolov received his Ph.D. in law, politics, and economics from the University of Sofia. He has worked as a business manager for clients such as Amazon and Intersport.
