= Natalia K. Nikolova =

Bulgarian and Canadian microwave engineer

Natalia K. Nikolova (née Georgieva) is a Bulgarian and Canadian microwave engineer whose research focuses on microwave imaging and radar imaging for applications including pipeline inspection, breast cancer diagnosis, and concealed weapon detection. She has also worked on the software analysis of radar and microwaves, and on the design of TEM (transverse electromagnetic) horn antennas for microwave imaging. She is a professor in the Department of Electrical & Computer Engineering at McMaster University, where she heads the Electromagnetic Vision (EMVi) Laboratory and serves as associate chair for research.

== Education and career ==
Nikolova was a student of radioelectronics at the Technical University of Varna, where she graduated with a diploma in engineering(the equivalent of a master's degree) in 1989. She completed a Ph.D. in Japan at the University of Electro-Communications in 1997.

After postdoctoral research with the Natural Sciences and Engineering Research Council, working at Dalhousie University and McMaster University, she took her present position in the Department of Electrical & Computer Engineering at McMaster University in 1999. At McMaster, she was given a Canada Research Chair in High-frequency Electromagnetics in 2008, renewed until 2018.

== Books ==
Nikolova is the author of Introduction to Microwave Imaging (Cambridge University Press, 2017) and a coauthor of Real-Time Three-Dimensional Imaging of Dielectric Bodies Using Microwave/Millimeter Wave Holography (IEEE Press, 2019, with Reza K. Amineh and Maryam Ravan).

== Recognition ==
Nikolova was named as an IEEE Distinguished Microwave Lecturer in 2010, and as an IEEE Fellow in 2011. She was elected to the Canadian Academy of Engineering in 2015, and to the Engineering Institute of Canada in 2021.
