= Nikolay Nikolov =

Nikolay Nikolov may refer to:

- Nikolay Nikolov (actor) (born 1964), Bulgarian actor
- Nikolay Nikolov (footballer, born 1981), Bulgarian footballer
- Nikolay Nikolov (footballer, born 1985), Bulgarian football player for Botev Vratsa
- Nikolay Nikolov (footballer, born 2005), Bulgarian footballer
- Nikolay Nikolov (mathematician)
- Nikolay Nikolov (pentathlete) (born 1954), Bulgarian modern pentathlete
- Nikolay Nikolov (pole vaulter) (born 1964), Bulgarian pole vaulter
- Nikolay Nikolov (volleyball) (born 1986), Bulgarian volleyball player
