= Nikolay Nikolov (actor) =

Bulgarian actor (born 1964)

- Born: June 3, 1964 (age 61); Targovishte, Bulgaria
- Occupation: Actor

Nikolay Petrov Nikolov (Bulgarian: Николай Петров Николов) (born June 3, 1964) is a Bulgarian actor. He is best known for his voice-over roles in famous television series like Friends, CSI: Crime Scene Investigation, Nip/Tuck, Lost, Prison Break, Heroes and many more.

== Acting career ==
In 1993, Nikolov graduated from VITIZ with a degree in drama in Krikor Azarian's class.

In 1994, he joined the Drama Theater in Sliven where he acted for three seasons. In 1999, he moved to Sofia to act in Sfumao, a theater workshop, where he worked with the directors Margarita Mladenova and Ivan Dobchev. He performed in The Mortal Antigone and The Blind Tiresias.

== Voice acting career ==
Nikolov started voicing films and television series in 2000. His first series was Friends for bTV, where he voiced Ross Geller and Chandler Bing. He has also dubbed various characters on The Adventures of Brisco County, Jr. (Diema Vision dub), Charmed, Rescue Me, The 4400, Studio 60 on the Sunset Strip, as well as animated series such as The Flintstones (Ars Digital Studio dub), The Flintstone Kids, The Sylvester and Tweety Mysteries, Histeria! and Extreme Ghostbusters.

== Personal life ==
He is divorced and has one son. Nikolov's favourite band is Jethro Tull.
