= Vasil Gyuzelev =

Bulgarian historian (born 1936)

Acad. Vasil Gyuzelev
- Васил Тодоров Гюзелев
- Born: Vasil Todorov Gyuzelev; 19 October 1936 (age 88); Rakovski, Bulgaria
- Occupation: Historian

Vasil Todorov Gyuzelev (Bulgarian: Васил Тодоров Гюзелев, born 19 October 1936) is a Bulgarian historian who studies Bulgaria during the Middle Ages.

== Biography ==
Gyuzelev was born in the village of Rakovski (today part of Dimitrovgrad) in 1936. Between 1954 and 1959 he studied history and archaeology in the Sofia University and then worked for a short time in the Museum of History in Dimitrovgrad. Gyuzelev worked in the Sofia university and served as a director of the National Museum of History between 1975 and 1977. In 1995 he became associate member and in 2003 academician of the Bulgarian Academy of Sciences.

== Publications ==
Gyuzelev is author of more than 50 books and 240 articles.

- 1969, Prince Boris I: Bulgaria in the second half of the 9th century
- 1987, Professor Petar Mutafchiev's Reflections on Bulgarian Medieval History
- 1995, Essays on the History of the Bulgarian Northeast and the Black Sea: the end of the 12th century to the beginning of the 15th century
- 2000, Reflections - on the New Exhibition of the National History Museum
- 2001, Dos and Don'ts in My Life as a Museum Worker
- 2005, An Attempt at a New Eulogy for Brothers Constantine-Cyril and Methodius
- 2006, Bulgarians are a Nation with an Unlived Childhood
- —, We are Nostalgic for Another Nessebar
