= Luke the Stylite =

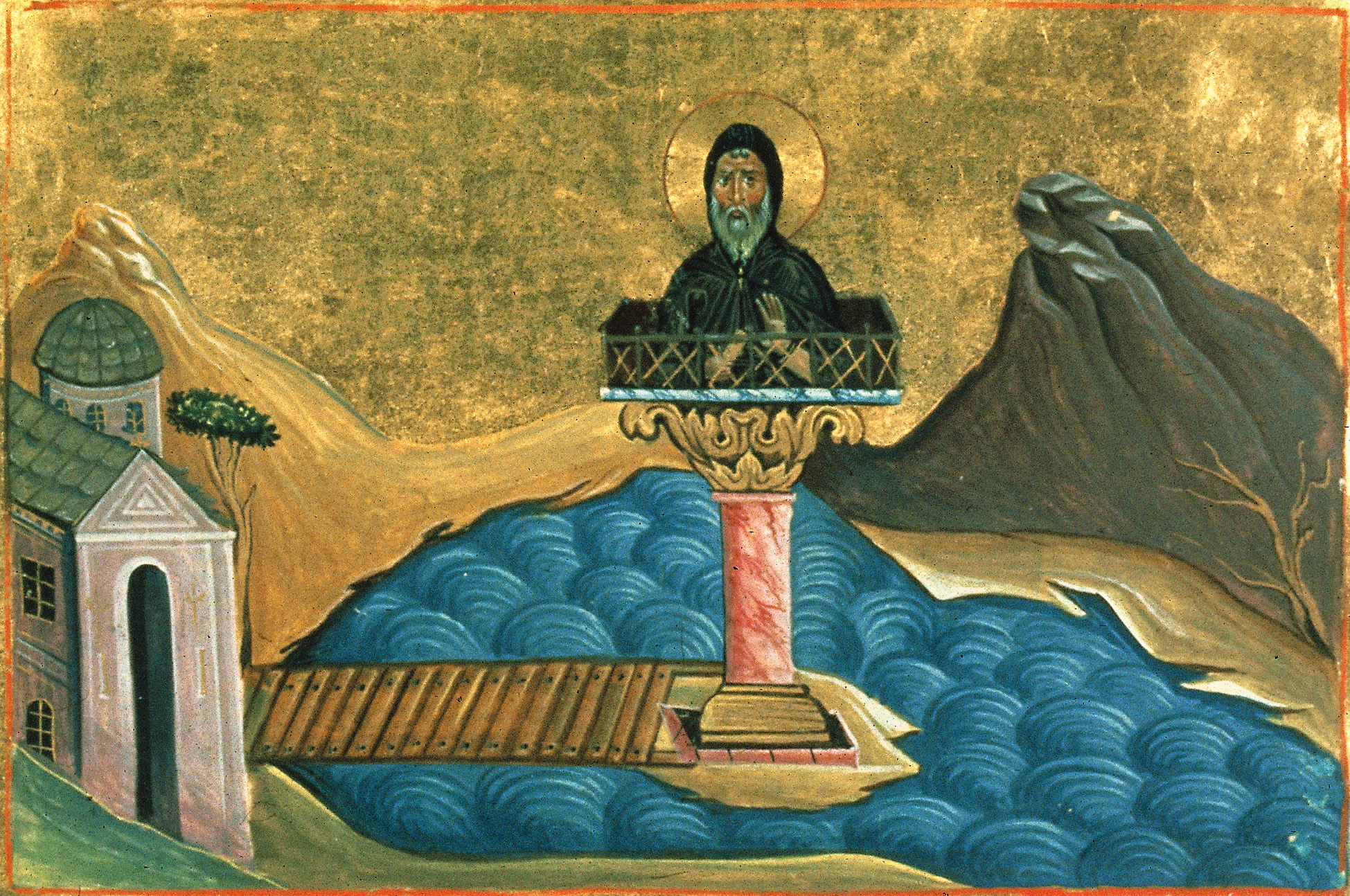
Luke the Stylites (Menologion of Basil II)

Venerable Luke the Stylite (Greek: Λουκάς ό Στυλίτης; c. 879-979?) lived in Constantinople in the 10th century.

He served as a soldier during the reign Constantine Porphyrogenitus the Byzantine Emperor. During battle against the Bulgarians Luke witnessed the death of several thousands of people. He believed God had preserved his life and he became a monk, and was later ordained as a presbyter. He decided to take up the ascetic and eremitic life of a stylite. After three years standing on the pillar, he went to Mount Olympos, and then to Constantinople, and finally to Chalcedon. For 45 years Luke lived atop a pillar near the city of Chalcedon in pursuit of sanctity in Christ. He is believed to have died circa 970 AD.

Luke the Stylite is commemorated on 11 December in the Eastern Orthodox and Byzantine Rite Eastern Catholic Churches.

== See also ==
- Simeon Stylites
- Daniel the Stylite
- Hermit
