= Vasil Zlatarski =

Bulgarian historian (1866–1935)

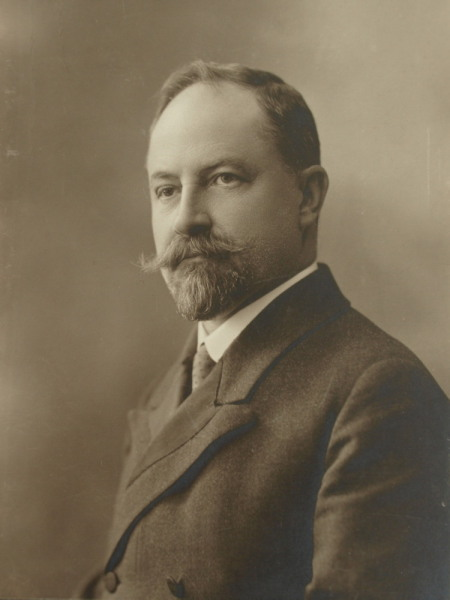
- Born: 14 November 1866 O.S. Veliko Tarnovo, Ottoman Empire (present-day Bulgaria)
- Died: 15 December 1935 (aged 69); Sofia, Kingdom of Bulgaria
- Resting place: Central Sofia Cemetery; 42°42.754′N 23°20.025′E
- Occupation: Historian
- Spouse: Slavka Markova
- Parents: Nikola Popvassiljov Zlatarski (father); Anastasia Gancheva (mother)
- Relatives: Georgi Zlatarski (brother)

Academic background
- Education: Saint Petersburg University; Berlin University

Academic work
- Institutions: Sofia University; Bulgarian Academy of Sciences

Vasil Nikolov Zlatarski (Bulgarian: Васил Николов Златарски; 26 November [O.S. 14 November] 1866 – 15 December 1935) was a Bulgarian historian-medievalist, archaeologist, and epigraphist.

== Life ==
Vasil Zlatarski was born in Veliko Tarnovo in 1866, the youngest child of the teacher Nikola Zlatarcheto (from his home-town Zlataritsa, near Tarnovo) who was a prominent activist in the educational movement and the religious and national struggle in the Tarnovo region before the Liberation. Zlatarski obtained his education in Veliko Tarnovo (until 3rd grade) and in the Peter and Paul Seminary at Liaskovets, near Tarnovo where he was preparing for priesthood. After the early death of his father, he went to his brother in Russia, where in 1887 he graduated the First Classical Lyceum in St. Petersburg. Studied History at the University of St. Petersburg in 1891 and as a post-graduate in Berlin in 1893–1895. Then he returned to Bulgaria and became a secondary school teacher in Sofia and Lecturer in the Higher School (now the Sofia University). He was promoted to the rank of full professor in 1906. Between 1926 and his death Zlatarski was vice-president of Bulgarian Academy of Sciences. Zlatarski was an historical objectivist, close to the positivist school. He contributed significantly to the development of Bulgarian historical science by becoming the first professor of history at the Sofia University who conducted original research and by creating the field of Bulgarian medieval history proper, within the parameters in which it still exists today. Between his first appointment at the university in 1893 and his death in 1935 he worked on his monumental History of the Bulgarian State in the Middle ages - a comprehensive study of the political history of the medieval Bulgarian state with long discussions of cultural and religious problems and meticulous analysis of broad source evidence. Zlatarski popularised historical research in the country and established contacts with major Russian and Western medievalists and Byzantinists such as A. A. Vasiliev or Henri Grégoire. He was the chairman of the Fourth International Congress of Byzantine Studies in Sofia, 1934.

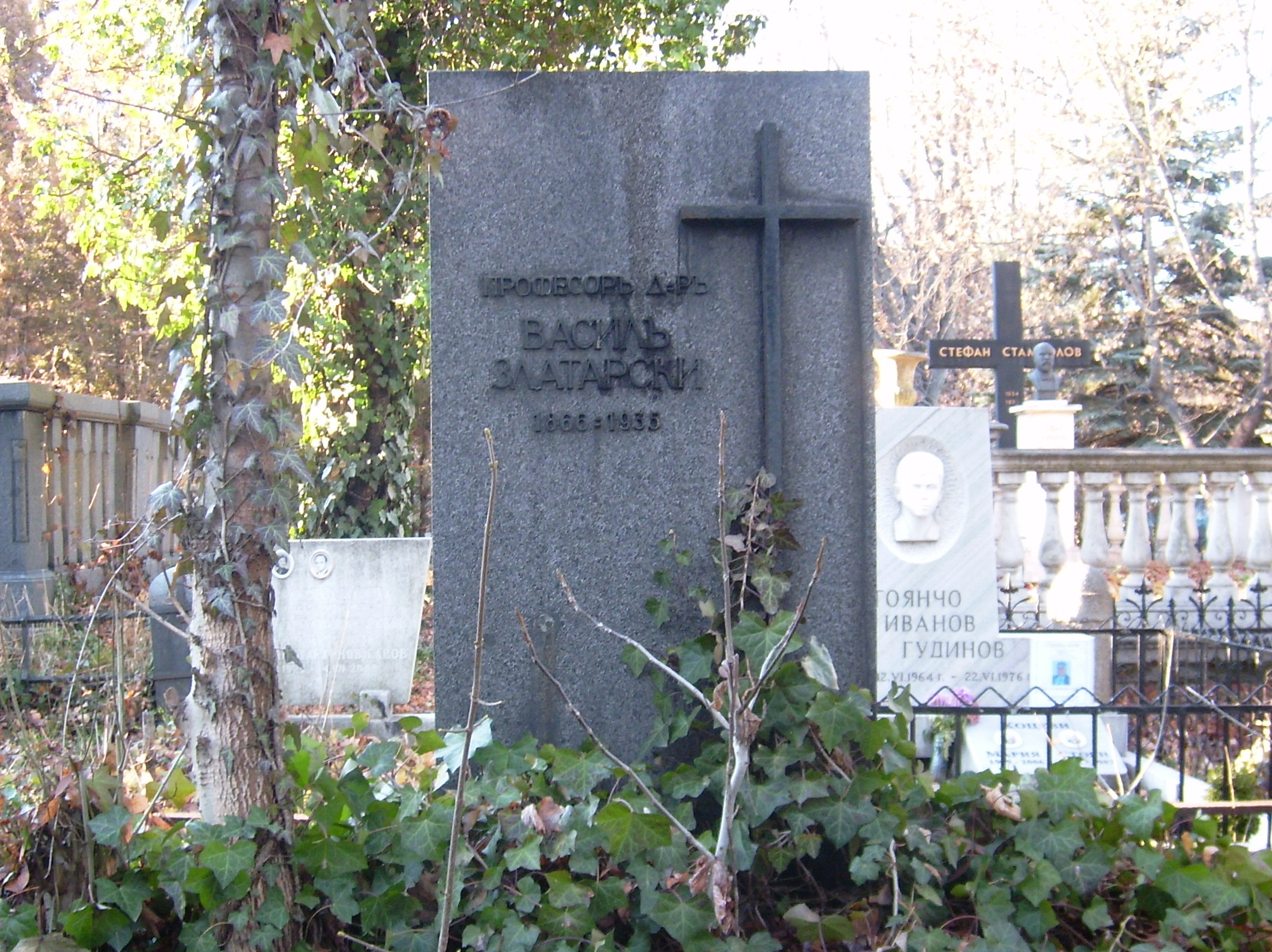
Vasil Zlatarski's Grave in Sofia (42°42.754′N 23°20.025′E)

== Selected works ==
- V. N. Zlatarski (1925). "The Making of the Bulgarian Nation". The Slavonic Review. 4 (11): 362–83. JSTOR 4201968.
- V. N. Zlatarski; N. B. Jopson (1926). "The Making of the Bulgarian Nation (II)". The Slavonic Review. 4 (12): 629–44. JSTOR 4201998.
