= Gelou =

Legendary Vlach ruler of Transylvania around 900 AD

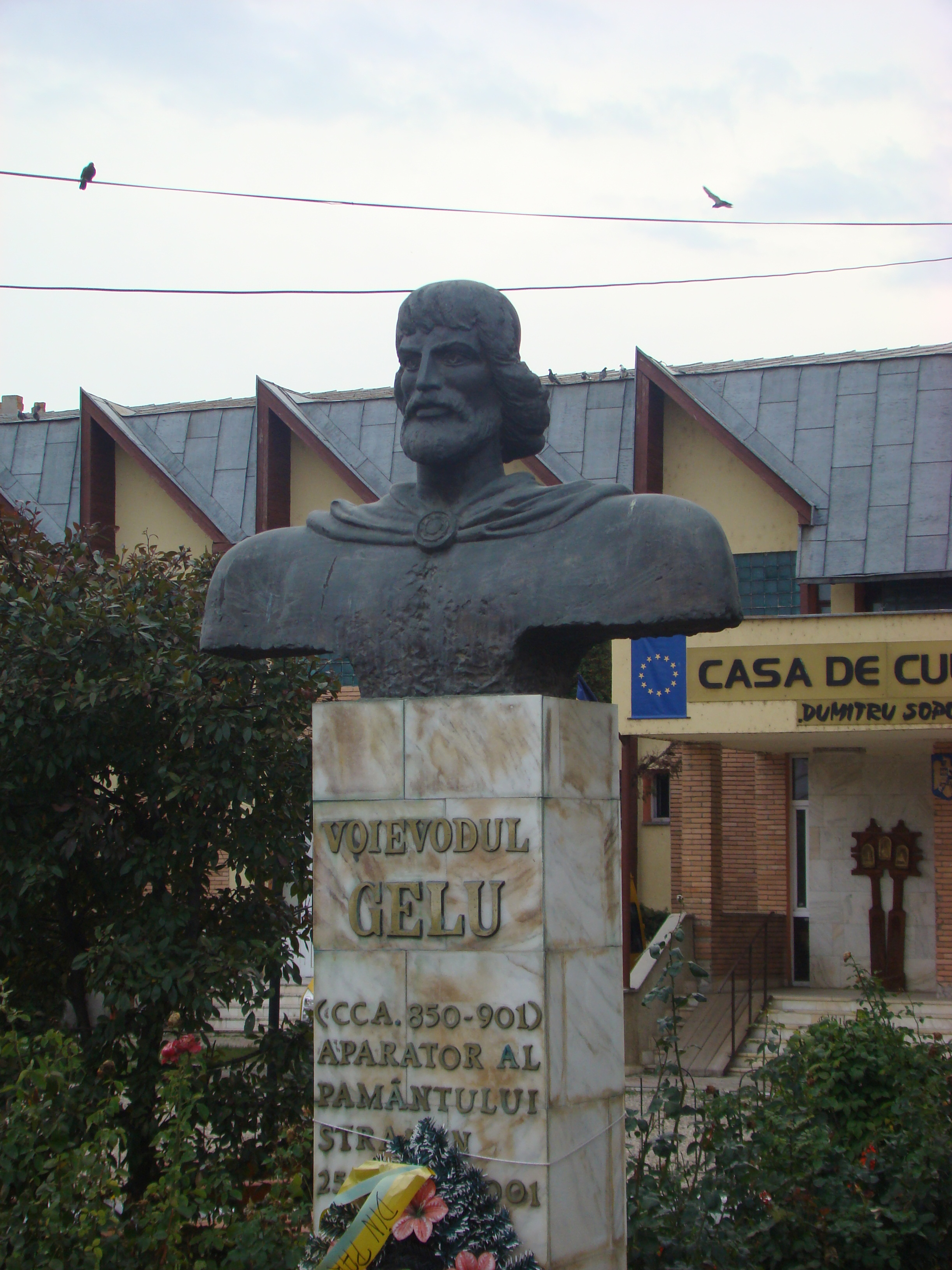
Gelou. Statuary in Gilău, Romania

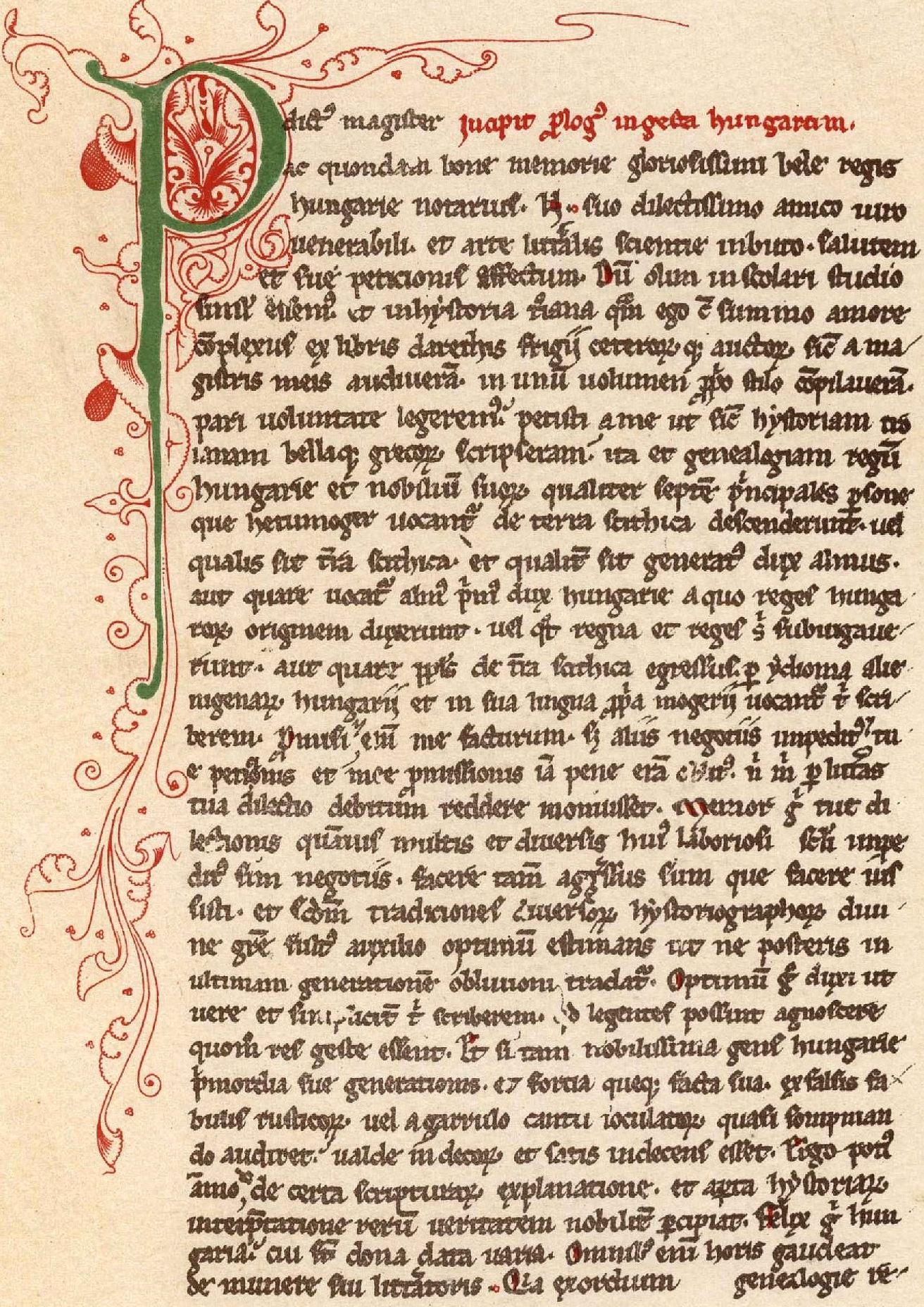
First page of the lone manuscript preserving the text of the Gesta Hungarorum, the only chronicle which mentions Gelou

Gelou (Romanian: Gelu; Hungarian: Gyalu) was the Vlach ruler of Transylvania at the time of the Hungarian conquest of the Carpathian Basin around 900 AD, according to the Gesta Hungarorum. Although the Gesta Hungarorum, which was written after 1150, does not indicate the enemies of the conquering Hungarians (Magyars) known from earlier annals and chronicles, it refers to local rulers—including Gelou—who are not mentioned in other primary sources. Consequently, historians debate whether Gelou was a historical person or an imaginary figure created by the unidentified author of the Gesta Hungarorum. In Romanian historiography, based on the mention of him by Anonymus some 300 years later, Gelou is considered one of three early-10th-century Romanian dukes with lands in the intra-Carpathian region of present-day Romania.

The Gesta Hungarorum describes pre-conquest Transylvania as a country rich in salt and gold, which was raided by Turkic peoples—"Cumans and Pechenegs"—before the arrival of the Magyars. Archaeological research indicates that a people who cremated their dead inhabited the regions of the Transylvanian salt mines from the seventh to the ninth centuries. Although excavated weapons suggest a military elite, none of the early-medieval Transylvanian fortresses uncovered can be reliably dated before the 10th century. The Gesta Hungarorum states that Gelou's duchy was inhabited by Vlachs and Slavs; most toponyms recorded by the chronicler in connection with Gelou's duchy are of Magyar origin. According to the Gesta Hungarorum, Tétény (or Tuhutum), who was one of seven Magyar chieftains, defeated Gelou's army at the Meseș Gates and Gelou was killed at the Căpuș River as he fled towards his unnamed fortress. Gelou's subjects then yielded to Tuhutum without further resistance.

== Background ==
What is known about Gelou comes from the Gesta Hungarorum (The Deeds of the Hungarians), the earliest surviving Hungarian chronicle. The Gesta was written during the second half of the 12th century or the early 13th century by an unidentified author, now known as Anonymus. It describes the Magyar conquest of the Carpathian Basin around 900.

The Magyars, settled in the Pontic–Caspian steppe by the 830s, began a westward migration after their defeat by a coalition of Pechenegs and Bulgarians in about 895. They crossed the Carpathian Mountains, invading the surrounding area. Gelou is a local ruler described in the Gesta Hungarorum as an opponent of the invading Magyars. Anonymus did not write about Simeon I of Bulgaria, Svatopluk I of Moravia or other opponents known from contemporary sources, instead chronicling Magyar battles with local rulers (including Gelou, Menumorut and Salan) not mentioned in other primary sources.

== Transylvania on the eve of the Hungarian conquest ==
The nomadic Avars dominated the Carpathian Basin from about 567. In Transylvania, archaeological evidence attributed to them around 630 is clustered in the region of the salt mines at Ocnișoara, Ocna Mureș and Turda, and along the rivers Mureș and Someș. The cremation cemeteries of the Mediaș group, a sedentary population, were also concentrated around the salt mines in the seventh to ninth centuries. Although the Mediaș cemeteries have been attributed to Slavs, according to Madgearu "the presence of Romanians in this context should not be ruled out". The names of many rivers in Transylvania—for instance, Bistrița ("swift"), Cerna ("black"), Dobra ("good") and Târnava ("thorny")—are of Slavic origin, indicating the historical presence of a Slavic-speaking population. According to Madgearu, two eighth-century spurs unearthed at Șura Mică and Medișoru Mare "suggest the existence of cavalry troops of Slavs and, perhaps, Romanians in Avar service" (since Avar spur use is uncertain).

The Avar Khaganate disintegrated after the Franks invaded its western regions three times between 791 and 803. A stone column erected during the reign of Omurtag of Bulgaria commemorates the 829 death of a Bulgarian commander named Onegavon at the river Tisa, indicating that the Bulgarians invaded the eastern regions of the one-time khaganate. According to the Annals of Fulda, in 894 Emperor Arnulf sent envoys to the Bulgarians to "ask that they should not sell salt to the Moravians"; this demonstrates that the Bulgarians controlled, at a minimum, the roads between the Transylvanian salt mines and Moravia.

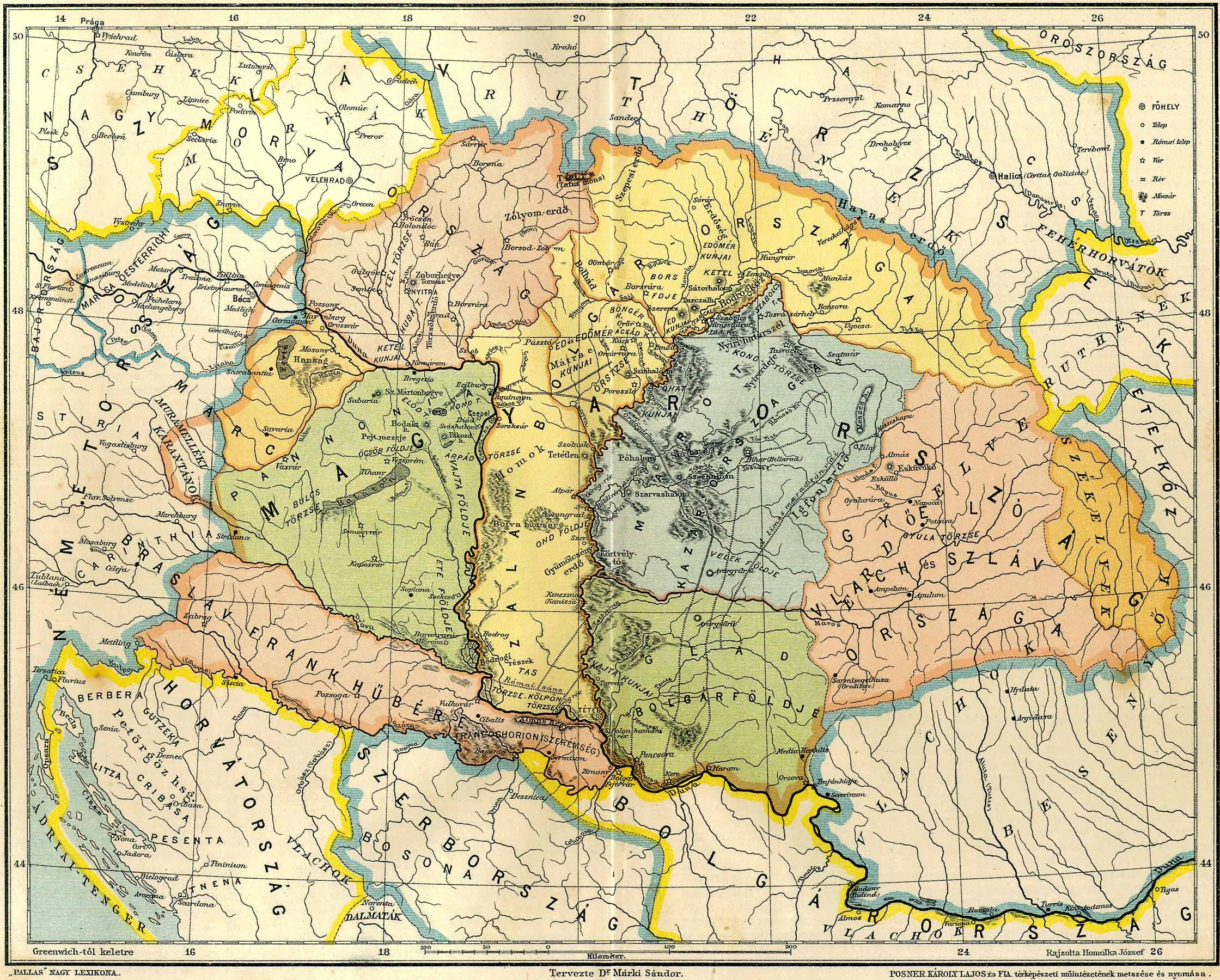
The Carpathian Basin on the eve of the "Hungarian Conquest", an early 20th-century map based primarily on the Gesta Hungarorum (Gelou's duchy is depicted in pink)

According to Kurdt Horedt, István Bóna and other historians, Dridu B pottery unearthed in the Alba Iulia region which was similar to ceramic utensils found along the lower Danube demonstrates that the Bulgarians expanded their authority over this region. Other historians (including Victor Spinei) reject this theory, saying that Dridu B ceramics can only prove cultural influences from the Balkan Peninsula. The so-called "Ciumbrud group" of cemeteries, which were also unearthed near Alba Iulia, yielded earrings and clothing accessories analogous to finds from the lower Danube region and Moravia. Spurs, weapons and other Frankish objects unearthed at Iernut, Tărtăria and other Transylvanian sites demonstrate ninth-century trade with the Carolingian Empire; similar spurs were also commonly used in Bulgaria and by 10th-century Magyars.

According to historians Vlad Georgescu, Ioan-Aurel Pop and Alexandru Madgearu, the existence of a ninth-century Vlach polity in the Carpatho-Danubian region is verified by the Gesta Hungarorum and contemporary sources. Alfred the Great's translation of the Historiae Adversus Paganos—a fifth-century work by Orosius—referred to "the Dacians, who were formerly Goths" and lived east of the Moravians and the "Vistula country". The 11th-century Persian scholar Gardizi, who studied the works of the late ninth-century Abu Abdallah al-Jayhani, wrote about the Nandars—"a people of Rūm who are all Christians"—who inhabited the lower Danube and the Carpathians. Pop identifies the "nandars" to be Romanians, but Bóna and Kristó consider them Bulgarians because nándor was the Hungarian term used for Bulgarians. Although Rūm is the New Persian term for Rome and the Roman Empire (thus seeming to describe the Latin-speaking Vlachs), Hungarian scholar Sándor identified a Persian source in which the Vlachs are referred to by "ulagh" rather than Rūm. Vladimir Minorsky also does not consider the "Nandars" to be Romanians, but "Onogur-Bulgarians", since the text mentions them in two places, south of the country of the Hungarians and the Danube, and above the Khazars, and west of the Volga, roughly where the state of the Volga Bulgarians was, and there were certainly never any Romanians living near the Volga. An Armenian geographical work mentions "an unknown country called Balak" north of Bulgaria. According to Pop and Georgescu, this demonstrates that a Vlach country existed in the region at the end of the ninth century. Manuscript studies indicate that the reference to Balak was interpolated after 1000, with the original text describing the "large country of Dacia" and its 25 Slavic tribes. According to the early-12th-century Primary Chronicle, although the Slavs were the first settlers west of the Carpathians, the Volokhs seized their territory. The Volokhs were expelled in turn by the Magyars, who "took their lands and settled among the Slavs". Many scholars, including Georgescu and Madgearu, identify the Volokhs as Vlachs fighting the invading Magyars. Although the majority of non-Romanian scholars consider the "Volokh" in the text to be the Franks, not the Vlachs, as they appear in other parts of the text and their state is described as being close to even England. (quote from the original text: "...do zemlĕ Agnjanski i do Vološ'ski..." "...to the English and Voloh lands..."). Since the Vlachs never reached Normandy, which was also the territory of the Volokhs mentioned in the text, it is highly probable that the text refers to the Franks, who were indeed driven out of the Carpathian Basin by the Hungarians at the time of the Hungarian conquest.

Although Romanian scholars have identified about a dozen Transylvanian fort sites in Gelou's duchy, none can be definitively dated before the turn of the ninth and tenth centuries. The forts at Dăbâca and Șirioara were destroyed between the last decades of the 10th century and the first half of the 11th, but their existence before 900 is unproven. At Dăbâca, "the evidence published so far, albeit poorly, does contain evidence of a ninth-century occupation of the site", according to archaeologist Florin Curta. Curta mentions two pairs of bell-shaped pendants, found outside the fort, which are similar to 9th-century Moravian artefacts. Another Romanian archaeologist, Alexandru Madgearu, writes that the bell-shaped pendants were only made after around 965, because similar jewellery was found at sites dated between the last third of the 10th century and the first half of the 11th century. Pottery finds suggest that the fortress at Cluj-Mănăștur may have been built during the ninth or tenth century. Early-medieval forts at Moigrad, Ortelec, Șimleu Silvaniei and Zalnoc were built at the turn of the 10th and 11th centuries, and the fort at Moldovenești even later. According to Vlad Georgescu, more than 40 excavated Transylvanian sites can be identified as settlements in Gelou's duchy. Furthermore, Madgearu argues it is certain that the place-name Gilău derives from Gelou, intended to preserve the leader's memory, given the Gesta Hungarorum records Gelou's death as having occurred in this area.

== Anonymus' narrative ==
=== Gelou and his duchy ===
The Magyars' arrival in the Carpathian Basin in the Illuminated Chronicle; according to this source and other 14th-century chronicles, the Magyars arrived in Transylvania after crossing the Carpathian Mountains (contradicting Anonymus' report of the Magyar route)

According to Anonymus, "Slavs, Bulgarians, Vlachs, and the shepherds of the Romans" inhabited the Carpathian Basin when the Magyars invaded the territory. The chronicler describes Transylvania (terra ultrasilvana, "the land beyond the woods") as a rich country with salt mines and gold-yielding rivers, inhabited by "Vlachs and Slavs" (blasij et sclaui) when the Magyars arrived, and records the names of five Transylvanian rivers or mountain passes. Unsurprisingly, most—Almaș, Aștileu, Căpuș and Mezeș—are of Hungarian origin, given at the time the source was written, Hungarian names had already replaced the old Romanian ones. In the Gesta Hungarorum Gelou is described as "a certain Vlach" (quidam blacus) and "prince of the Vlachs" (ducem blacorum), indicating that the Vlachs were considered the dominant Transylvanian population.

Then Tuhutum, having heard of the goodness of that land, sent his envoys to Duke Arpád to ask his permission to go beyond the woods [ultra silvas] to fight Duke Gelou. Duke Árpád, having taken counsel, commended Tuhutum's wish and he gave him permission to go beyond the woods to fight Duke Gelou. When Tuhutum heard this from an envoy, he readied himself with his warriors and, having left his companions there, went forth eastwards beyond the woods against Gelou, duke of the Vlachs. Gelou, duke of Transylvania, hearing of his arrival, gathered his army and rode speedily towards him in order to stop him at the Meszes Gates, but Tuhutum, crossing the wood in one day, arrived at the Almas river. Then both armies came upon each other, with the river lying between them. Duke Gelou planned to stop them there with his archers.

— Gesta Hungarorum

According to Anonymus, Gelou "was not steadfast and did not have around him good warriors". The Vlachs and Slavs of Transylvania were "the basest of the whole world" because "they had nothing else for arms than bows and arrows"; Transylvanian weakness was the result of frequent raids by "the Cumans and Pechenegs". According to Ioan Aurel Pop, Anonymus' description of Gelou's subjects indicates a sedentary people called to arms. Carlile Aylmer Macartney writes that the Blasii and Picenati words for Vlachs and Pechenegs and the reference to their "bows and arrows" suggest that Anonymus borrowed the text from a work describing the route of the Third or Fourth Crusade across the Balkans; the late-12th-century Historia de expeditione Friderici imperatoris refers to Vlachs and Cumanians and their bows and arrows. Based on Anonymus's narrative, Sălăgean says that Gelou's polity was small compared with the other five mentioned in the Gesta Hungarorum.

=== Conquest of Transylvania ===
Anonymus and the late 13th-century Simon of Kéza wrote that the Magyars bypassed Transylvania after crossing the northern Carpathians. However, 14th-century Hungarian chronicles preserve a tradition contradicting these narratives. In the Illuminated Chronicle, the Magyars first arrived in Transylvania (Erdelw) with their conquest, "remain[ing] quietly in Erdelw and rest[ing] their herds" before moving further west.

The Gesta Hungarorum recounts a meeting of three Hungarian chieftains—Tétény (or Tuhutum), Szabolcs and Tas—after their victory over Menumorut, who is described as lord of Bihor. They decided that "the border of the realm of Prince Árpád" (the head of the Magyars) "should be at the Mezeș Gates", forcing the local population to build a stone-and-timber enclosure at the new border. Tétény soon sent a spy, "father Agmánd Apafarkas", to reconnoitre the land east of the Mezeș Gates. The spy informed him of Transylvania's wealth and its ruler's weakness. Before the invasion, Tétény "sent his envoys" to Árpád for permission. With Árpád's consent, Tétény hurried to the Mezeș Gates; according to Madgearu, his attack was "clearly targeted toward the salt mine district" of Transylvania.

Gelou "gathered his army and rode speedily" to the border to stop the invaders. Tétény crossed the forest in one day, forcing Gelou to retreat to the Almaș River and fight the Magyars there. The next day, Tétény divided his army and "sent one part a little way upstream" to cross the Almaș and surprise Gelou. Gelou was defeated, with many of his men killed or captured. Although he fled from the battlefield towards "his castle beside the Someș River", Tétény's soldiers chased and killed him on the banks of the Căpuș River, near the place where the village Gilău (which was first mentioned in the 13th century) is located. When they heard about their lord's death the inhabitants of Transylvania conceded, acknowledging Tétény as their new lord. They swore an oath of loyalty to him at a place later named Așchileu (in Hungarian, Eskellő, which derived from eskü, meaning "oath" in Hungarian, according to Anonymus). Anonymus ends his account of the Hungarian conquest of Transylvania by saying that Tétény governed Transylvania "peacefully and happily from that day, but his posterity possessed it only up to the times of the holy King Stephen" (who conquered the province around 1000).

== In modern historiography ==
The Gesta Hungarorum's reliability—particularly regarding Gelou, Glad, Menumorut and the other rulers described as fighting the conquering Magyars—has been debated by scholars since the publication of the chronicle during the late 18th century. Most Romanian historians (including Vlad Georgescu, Alexandru Madgearu and Victor Spinei) believe that Anonymus' story of the three dukes and their realms is reliable. Madgearu says that Anonymus' "account about the conquest" of Transylvania "combines data taken from oral tradition with invented facts", but "Gelou was a real person and his name could be considered authentic". Spinei also writes that most reports in the Gesta Hungarorum "are not inventions, but they have a real support, even if here and there some anachronisms occurred." He cites the role of the Cumans as an example, saying that the Hungarian word translated by Anonymus as "Cumans" (kun) originally referred to any nomadic Turkic tribe.

During the late 1960s through 1989, Dăbâca was assumed the capital city of Gelou, during the excavations at Dăbâca, according to Florin Curta, Romanian archaeologists "made every possible effort to turn Dăbâca into a Transylvanian Troy and to prove that the Gesta was a reliable source for the medieval history of (Romanian) Transylvania", while "the evidence published so far, albeit poorly, does contain evidence of a 9th century occupation on the site ... the impression the attentive reader will get from the 1968 archeological report is that, far from cunningly distorting or destroying the evidence, the excavators were overwhelmed by the complexity of the site and embarrassed that no substantial evidence was found to prove the Gesta right." He argues that based on two pairs of silver pendants, similar to 9th-century Moravian jewellery, that were found at the site, may prove that the first encampment existed in the 9th century.

In contrast, Madgearu states that "the investigators proposed a date in the 9th century for these pendants, but this is impossible, because such pieces were found only in sites dated between the last third of the 10th century and the first half of the 11th century, therefore, these pendants show that the first stage lasted until a moment that could be placed between the last third of the 10th century and the first half of the 11th century". According to Madgearu, "stage I ended with the burning of the entire fortress ... it can be concluded that the destruction that ended the first stage occurred around the beginning of the 11th century. This means that the historical event that could be associated with this archaeological evidence is the attack of King Stephen I against the Transylvanian duke, happened in 1002 or 1003." however "the destruction of stage I had no relation with the conflict in which Gelou was involved. No earlier destruction was observed. This fact does not rule out a dating of stage I during the time of Gelou, because the fortress could have remained untouched, since, according to Gesta Hungarorum, the men of Gelou surrendered to the Hungarians after his death". Concluding his case about the excavations, Madgearu argues that "the existence of the Dăbâca fortress since the 9th century is not yet proven by the archaeological evidence, but it is still possible, since some excavations results were not published. On the other hand, if the events related by Gesta Hungarorum occurred, mast probably, in the 930s, a date during the time of Gelou remains possible. Taking into account that stage I had two phases and that the settlement from phase 2 had two or three levels, it could be supposed that stage I lasted for about a century, which means that its beginning could be placed before the Hungarian conquest. However, there are no certain archaeological arguments for this idea". Additionally, Madgearu casts doubt of whether Dăbâca was indeed Gelou's capital city in Gesta Hungarorum "Even if it was contemporary with Gelou, the fortress from Dăbâca cannot be identified with the residence mentioned in Gesta Hungarorum. From the relation of the conflict it results that Gelou, after being defeated somewhere on the Almaş valley, went back to his fort located on the Someş River. Since he was killed near the Căpuş River, most probably at Gilău, it can be inferred that the target of his retreat was Cluj, not Dăbâca. Had he wanted to go to Dăbâca, he would have chosen another way, a shorter one, over the hills between Alrnaş and Dăbâca". Based on toponymy, Madgearu argues that Dăbâca may have existed before the Hungarian conquest "the fact that the Dăbâca fortress bears a Slavic name is very important. If it had been built by Hungarians, its name would have also been Hungarian, like Şirioara and Cuzdrioara. Besides, we know that a place called Tiligrad (which means "complete fortress") exists 1.6 km away from the fortress. Dăbâca belongs to the group of early medieval Transylvanian fortifications with Slavic, pre-Hungarian names: Bălgrad (Alba-Iulia), Tiligrad (Blandiana), Moigrad. Since none of these names has any meaning in Romanian, it results that they were created when the Slavs were not yet assimilated". with his final conclusion about Dăbâca being that "the building of the Dăbâca fortress during the 9th century is not yet demonstrated, but remains possible. Even if this fortified settlement actually existed before the Hungarian attack, the identitfication with the residence located on the Someş is contradicted by its location, too far from the warzone described in Gesta Hungarorum.

Most Hungarian historians (including István Bóna, Pál Engel and Gyula Kristó), opponing to Romanian theories, write that Anonymus had no real knowledge of the Carpathian Basin (including Transylvania) at the time of the Hungarian conquest and invented all the opponents of the Hungarians because he needed characters to be defeated by the conquerors. According to this view, Gelou is one of a half-dozen "imaginary figures"—including Laborec, Menumorut and Zobor—named by Anonymus for a river, hill or settlement. If this theory is true, Gelou was named after Gilău (Gyalu in Hungarian), a Transylvanian village in which Gelou dies in the Gesta. According to Tudor Sălăgean, the village of Gilău was apparently named for the duke. Madgearu concurs, stating that Gilău was intended to preserve Gelou's memory following his death in this very area. Zoltán Kordé says that the names of the village and the duke may have Hungarian or Turkic origins. In contrast, Ciocîltan maintains that the name Gelou is authentic and originally Romanian, proposing that its original form was Gelău, but that the vowel ă transcribed elsewhere as o as was done in numerous other medieval sources at the time (e.g., Copus for Căpuș). Dennis Deletant is of the opinion that "the cases for and against the existence of Gelou and the Vlachs simply cannot be proven".

== See also ==
- Glad (duke)
- Laborec
- Menumorut
- Romania in the Early Middle Ages
- Origin of the Romanians

== Sources ==
=== Primary sources ===
- Anonymus, Notary of King Béla: The Deeds of the Hungarians (Edited, Translated and Annotated by Martyn Rady and László Veszprémy) (2010). In: Rady, Martyn; Veszprémy, László; Bak, János M. (2010); Anonymus and Master Roger; CEU Press; ISBN 978-963-9776-95-1.
- The Annals of Fulda (Ninth-Century Histories, Volume II) (Translated and annotated by Timothy Reuter) (1992). Manchester University Press. ISBN 0-7190-3458-2.
- The Geography of Ananias of Širak (AŠXARHAC'OYC'): The Long and the Short Recensions (Introduction, Translation and Commentary by Robert H. Hewsen) (1992). Dr. Ludwig Reichert Verlag. ISBN 3-88226-485-3.
- The Hungarian Illuminated Chronicle: Chronica de Gestis Hungarorum (Edited by Dezső Dercsényi) (1970). Corvina, Taplinger Publishing. ISBN 0-8008-4015-1.

=== Secondary sources ===
- Boia, Lucian (2001). History and Myth in Romanian Consciousness (Translated by James Christian Brown). CEU Press. ISBN 963-9116-96-3.
- Bóna, István (1994). "The Hungarian–Slav Period (895–1172)". In Köpeczi, Béla; Barta, Gábor; Bóna, István; Makkai, László; Szász, Zoltán; Borus, Judit (eds.). History of Transylvania. Akadémiai Kiadó. pp. 109–177. ISBN 963-05-6703-2.
- Curta, Florin (2001). "Transylvania around A.D. 1000". In Urbańczyk, Przemysław (ed.). Europe around the year 1000. Wydawn. DiG. pp. 141–165. ISBN 978-837-1-8121-18.
- Deletant, Dennis (1992). "Ethnos and Mythos in the History of Transylvania: the case of the chronicler Anonymus". In Péter, László (ed.). Historians and the History of Transylvania. Boulder. pp. 67–85. ISBN 0-88033-229-8.
- Györffy, György (1988). Anonymus: Rejtély vagy történeti forrás [Anonymous: An Enigma or a Source for History] (in Hungarian). Akadémiai Kiadó. ISBN 963-05-4868-2.
- Engel, Pál (2001). The Realm of St Stephen: A History of Medieval Hungary, 895–1526. I.B. Tauris Publishers. ISBN 1-86064-061-3.
- Georgescu, Vlad (1991). The Romanians: A History. Ohio State University Press. ISBN 0-8142-0511-9.
- Kordé, Zoltán (1994). "Gyalu". In Kristó, Gyula; Engel, Pál; Makk, Ferenc (eds.). Korai magyar történeti lexikon (9–14. század) [Encyclopedia of the Early Hungarian History (9th–14th centuries)] (in Hungarian). Akadémiai Kiadó. p. 241. ISBN 963-05-6722-9.
- Kristó, Gyula (1996). Hungarian History in the Ninth Century. Szegedi Középkorász Muhely. ISBN 963-482-113-8.
- Kristó, Gyula (2003). Early Transylvania (895–1324). Lucidus Kiadó. ISBN 963-9465-12-7.
- Macartney, C. A. (1953). The Medieval Hungarian Historians: A Critical and Analytical Guide. Cambridge University Press. ISBN 978-0-521-08051-4.
- Macartney, C. A. (1968). The Magyars in the Ninth Century. Cambridge University Press. ISBN 978-0-521-08070-5.
- Madgearu, Alexandru (2005a). "Salt Trade and Warfare: The Rise of Romanian-Slavic Military Organization in Early Medieval Transylvania". In Curta, Florin (ed.). East Central & Eastern Europe in the Early Middle Ages. The University of Michigan Press. pp. 103–120. ISBN 978-0-472-11498-6.
- Madgearu, Alexandru (2005b). The Romanians in the Anonymous Gesta Hungarorum: Truth and Fiction. Romanian Cultural Institute, Center for Transylvanian Studies. ISBN 973-7784-01-4.
- Nägler, Thomas (2005). "Transylvania between 900 and 1300". In Pop, Ioan-Aurel; Nägler, Thomas (eds.). The History of Transylvania, Vol. I. (Until 1541). Romanian Cultural Institute (Center for Transylvanian Studies). pp. 198–231. ISBN 973-7784-00-6.
- Pop, Ioan Aurel (1996). Romanians and Hungarians from the 9th to the 14th Century: The Genesis of the Transylvanian Medieval State. Centrul de Studii Transilvane, Fundaţia Culturală Română. ISBN 973-577-037-7.
- Róna-Tas, András (1999). Hungarians and Europe in the Early Middle Ages: An Introduction to Early Hungarian History (Translated by Nicholas Bodoczky). CEU Press. ISBN 978-963-9116-48-1.
- Sălăgean, Tudor (2005). "Romanian Society in the Early Middle Ages (9th–14th Centuries AD)". In Pop, Ioan-Aurel; Bolovan, Ioan (eds.). History of Romania: Compendium. Romanian Cultural Institute (Center for Transylvanian Studies). pp. 133–207. ISBN 978-973-7784-12-4.
- Sălăgean, Tudor (2006). Tara lui Gelou: Contributii la istoria Transilvaniei de Nord in secolele IX-XI [Gelou's Realm: Contribution to the History of Northern Transylvania in the 9th–11th Centuries] (in Romanian). Ed. Argonaut. ISBN 978-973-109-007-8.
- Shukurov, Rustam (2019). The Image of Rūm in Persian Epics: From Firdawsī to Niẓāmī. Leibniz ScienceCampus Mainz / Frankfurt.
- Spinei, Victor (2009). The Romanians and the Turkic Nomads North of the Danube Delta from the Tenth to the Mid-Thirteenth century. Koninklijke Brill NV. ISBN 978-90-04-17536-5.
