= Laborec (disambiguation) =

Laborec may refer to:

- Laborec, an alleged ruler in the 9th century
- Laborec Castle
- Laborec
- Laborec Highlands
