= Kamenica nad Cirochou =

- Municipality
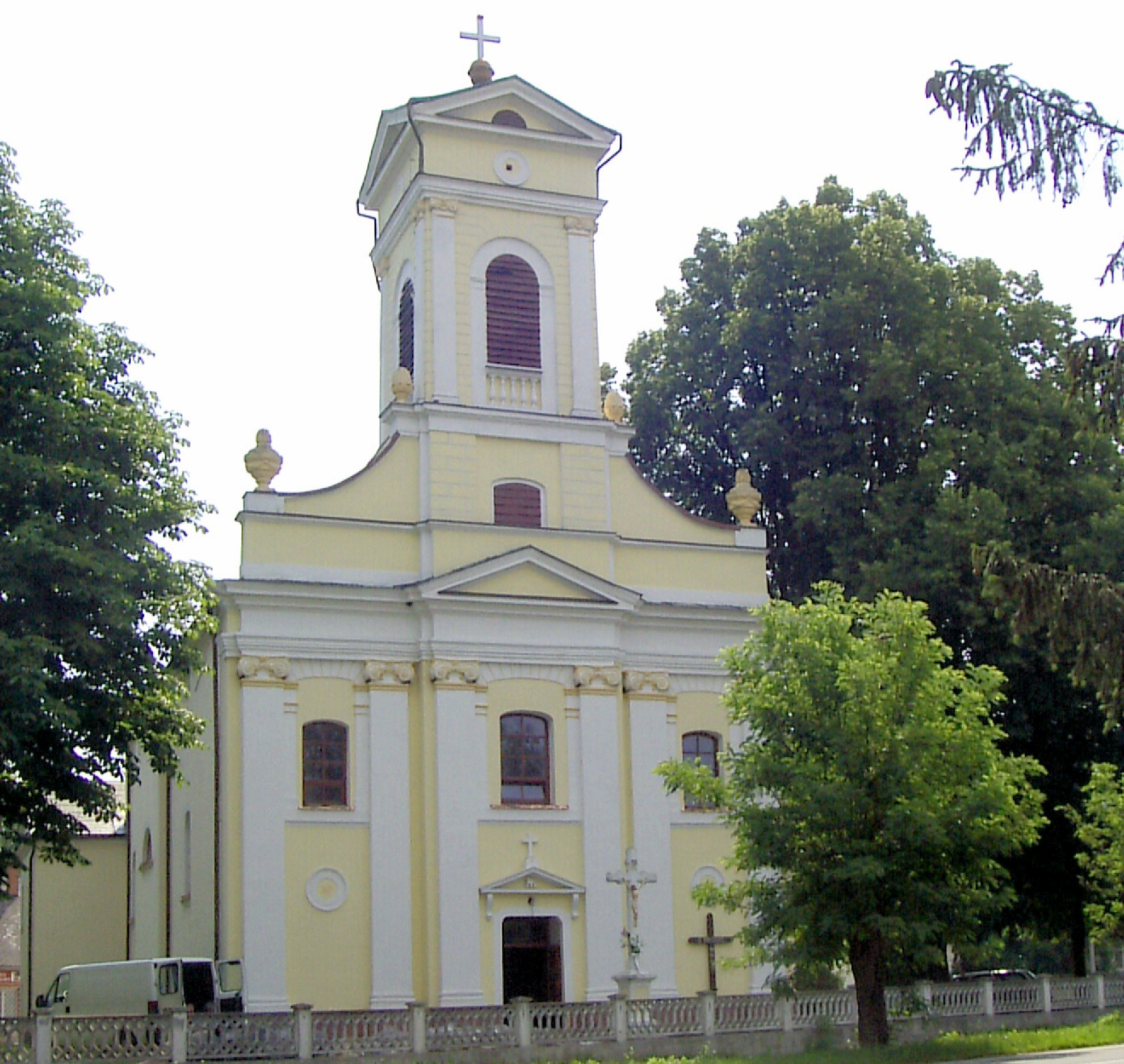

- Flag Coat of arms

- Location of Kamenica nad Cirochou in the Prešov Region Location of Kamenica nad Cirochou in Slovakia
- Coordinates: 48.93°N 22.00°E
- Country: Slovakia
- Region: Prešov Region
- District: Humenné District
- First mentioned: 1451

Area
  - Total: 17.65 km^{2} (6.81 sq mi)
- Elevation: 184 m (604 ft)

Population (2025)
  - Total: 2,309
- Time zone: UTC+1 (CET)
  - Summer (DST): UTC+2 (CEST)
- Postal code: 678 3
- Area code: +421 57
- Vehicle registration plate (until 2022): HE
- Website: www.obeckamenicanadcirochou.sk

Kamenica nad Cirochou (Hungarian: Nagykemence) is a village and municipality in Humenné District in the Prešov Region of north-east Slovakia. By number of citizens it is the biggest village in the District. There are two rivers Cirocha and Kamenica that merge approximately 1 km off the village.

== History ==
The original site of village was significantly closer to Cirocha river. Change was induced probably by regular floods.

In historical records the village was first mentioned in 1317. King Robert I. gave it, together with other villages and town of Humenné, as a reward for faithful service to Drugeth family. It is assumed that village is older than with estimated origin in 13. century.

First known name of the village was Kemence and from 1416 it is called in official records Nagy Kemence. Mansion located in the village was built by Csáky family. Later it was owned by Andrássy family and Gejza Andrassy was the last count that lived in the mansion. In 1925 he sold part of land to citizens which lead to village expansion. In 1933 state took over management of woods and fields from the same count. With this change is linked origin of Military forests in the area and building electric sawmill.

== Demographic evolution ==
Demographic evolution

Mother language	1880	1890	1900	1910	2011
Slovak	919	1028	949	868	2041
Hungarian	7	23	26	113	1
German	60	1	22	2	1
Rusyn			8		30
Romani					184
Ukrainian					2
Czech					6
Foreigners	1				
Other		26	34	84	4
Not speaking	15				
Not identified					110

Religion	1880	1890	1900	1910	2011
Latin	796	870	865	863	2011
Greek-catholic	149	183	152	139	161
Judaism	54	24	20	40	
Evangelical Church of the Augsburg Confession	3	1	1	10	7
Calvinism			1	15	
Eastern Orthodox					17
Jehovah's Witnesses					1
United Methodist Church					1
Czechoslovak Hussite Church					1
Other					1
without religion					48
Not identified					131

Source: Statistical office of the Slovak republic

== Geography ==
The municipality lies at an altitude of 184 metres (604 ft) and covers an area of 17.65 km^{2} (6.81 sq mi) (2025).

=== Climate ===
Climate data for Kamenica nad Cirochou (1991−2020)
Month	Jan	Feb	Mar	Apr	May	Jun	Jul	Aug	Sep	Oct	Nov	Dec	Year
Record high °C (°F)	13.2 (55.8)	16.2 (61.2)	23.0 (73.4)	29.0 (84.2)	32.4 (90.3)	35.5 (95.9)	37.3 (99.1)	38.1 (100.6)	35.9 (96.6)	25.5 (77.9)	23.0 (73.4)	14.0 (57.2)	38.1 (100.6)
Mean daily maximum °C (°F)	1.5 (34.7)	4.0 (39.2)	9.6 (49.3)	16.6 (61.9)	21.3 (70.3)	24.8 (76.6)	26.7 (80.1)	26.8 (80.2)	21.0 (69.8)	14.9 (58.8)	8.6 (47.5)	2.5 (36.5)	14.9 (58.8)
Daily mean °C (°F)	−1.8 (28.8)	−0.2 (31.6)	4.2 (39.6)	10.2 (50.4)	14.8 (58.6)	18.5 (65.3)	20.1 (68.2)	19.5 (67.1)	14.3 (57.7)	9.3 (48.7)	4.7 (40.5)	−0.4 (31.3)	9.4 (48.9)
Mean daily minimum °C (°F)	−5.1 (22.8)	−4.2 (24.4)	−0.8 (30.6)	3.5 (38.3)	8.0 (46.4)	11.9 (53.4)	13.6 (56.5)	12.9 (55.2)	8.7 (47.7)	4.8 (40.6)	1.2 (34.2)	−3.3 (26.1)	4.3 (39.7)
Record low °C (°F)	−24.3 (−11.7)	−26.2 (−15.2)	−17.7 (0.1)	−7.7 (18.1)	−5.4 (22.3)	2.5 (36.5)	4.7 (40.5)	4.1 (39.4)	−1.9 (28.6)	−9.0 (15.8)	−14.0 (6.8)	−28.2 (−18.8)	−28.2 (−18.8)
Average precipitation mm (inches)	34.7 (1.37)	37.7 (1.48)	35.1 (1.38)	48.8 (1.92)	81.0 (3.19)	82.0 (3.23)	109.3 (4.30)	80.9 (3.19)	71.1 (2.80)	62.7 (2.47)	48.2 (1.90)	43.2 (1.70)	734.7 (28.93)
Average precipitation days (≥ 1.0 mm)	8.3	7.9	7.8	7.5	10.5	10.3	10.6	7.5	8.1	8.1	8.0	8.6	103.1
Average snowy days	13.9	11.1	6.1	1.4	0.0	0.0	0.0	0.0	0.0	0.6	4.8	12.0	49.9
Average relative humidity (%)	80.9	76.8	68.8	64.1	68.8	69.6	70.2	71.4	76.2	78.2	80.2	82.1	73.9
Mean monthly sunshine hours	49.6	72.3	137.1	185.6	226.6	238.0	248.6	254.3	176.2	121.6	62.8	35.6	1,808.3
Source: NOAA

== Airports ==
- Humenne-Kamenica Airport - Main airport of the Humenné District, Humenne-Kamenica Airport is located here.

== Sights ==
- Classicist mansion from 1773 (at the moment closed to the public).
- Church of St. Stephen from 1782.
