= Strážske =

Strážske Őrmező
- Municipality
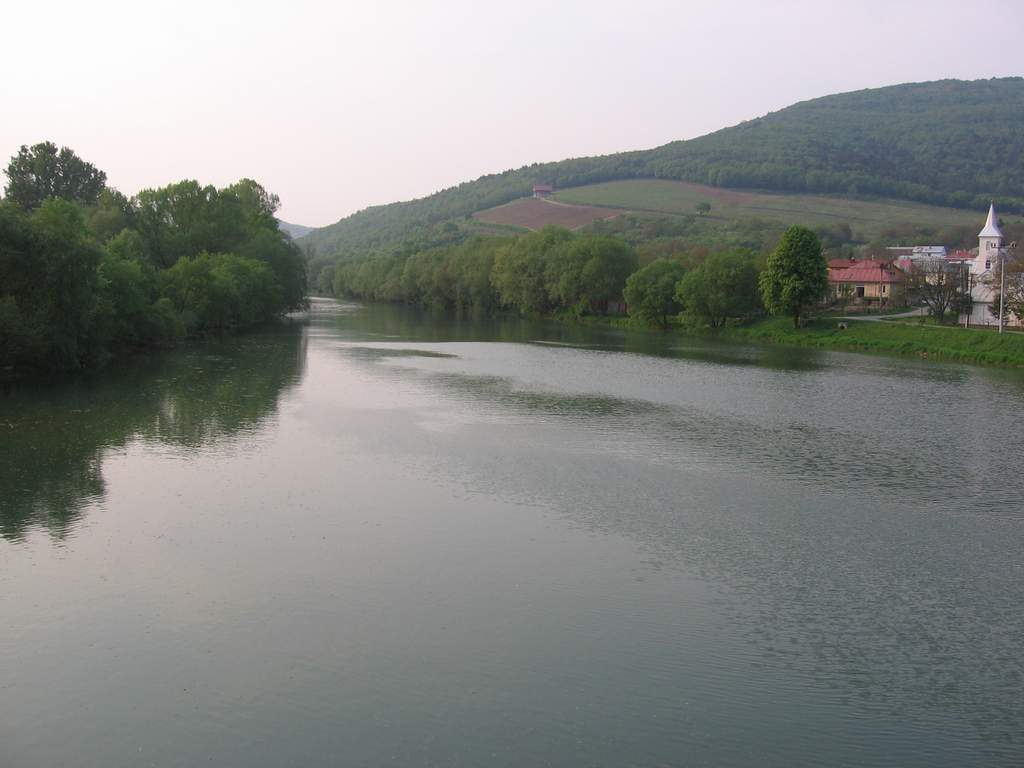

- Flag Coat of arms

- Location of Strážske in the Košice Region Location of Strážske in Slovakia
- Coordinates: 48.87°N 21.82°E
- Country: Slovakia
- Region: Košice Region
- District: Michalovce District
- First mentioned: 1337

Government
  - Mayor: Patrik Magdoško

Area
  - Total: 24.77 km^{2} (9.56 sq mi)
- Elevation: 134 m (440 ft)

Population (2025)
  - Total: 4,169
- Time zone: UTC+1 (CET)
  - Summer (DST): UTC+2 (CEST)
- Postal code: 722 2
- Area code: +421 56
- Vehicle registration plate (until 2022): MI
- Website: strazske.sk

Strážske (Slovak pronunciation: [ˈstraːʂske]; German: Straschke (rare); Hungarian: Őrmező) is a small town and municipality in Michalovce District in the Kosice Region of eastern Slovakia. It is located in the northernmost part of Michalovce District.

== History ==
In historical records the town was first mentioned in 1337. Before the establishment of independent Czechoslovakia in 1918, it was part of Zemplén County within the Kingdom of Hungary.

== Geography ==
The municipality lies at an altitude of 134 metres (440 ft) and covers an area of 24.77 km^{2} (9.56 sq mi) (2025). The town lies on the Laborec River.

== Population ==
Historical population
Year	Pop.	±%
1970	2,885	—
1980	3,631	+25.9%
1991	4,255	+17.2%
2001	4,474	+5.1%
2011	4,416	−1.3%
2021	4,277	−3.1%
Source: Censuses

Population statistic (10 years)
Year	1995	2005	2015	2025
Count	4485	4523	4389	4169
Difference		+0.84%	−2.96%	−5.01%

Population statistic
Year	2024	2025
Count	4166	4169
Difference		+0.07%

It has a population of 4169 people (31 December 2025).

=== Ethnicity ===
Census 2021 (1+ %)
Ethnicity	Number	Fraction
Slovak	3819	89.29%
Not found out	377	8.81%
Romani	77	1.8%
Rusyn	70	1.63%
Total	4277	

In year 2021 was 4277 people by ethnicity 3819 as Slovak, 377 as Not found out, 77 as Romani, 70 as Rusyn, 35 as Czech, 29 as Ukrainian, 16 as Other, 8 as Russian, 8 as Hungarian, 4 as German, 2 as Vietnamese, 2 as Polish, 1 as Moravian, 1 as Croatian, 1 as English and 1 as Albanian.

Note on population: The difference values of population numbers in the table "Population statistic" and in the sections "Ethnicity" & "Religion" is caused by the use of various statistical methods.

=== Religion ===
Census 2021 (1+ %)
Religion	Number	Fraction
Roman Catholic Church	2525	59.04%
Greek Catholic Church	734	17.16%
None	427	9.98%
Not found out	348	8.14%
Eastern Orthodox Church	115	2.69%
Total	4277	

In year 2021 was 4277 people by religion 2525 from Roman Catholic Church, 734 from Greek Catholic Church, 427 from None, 348 from Not found out, 115 from Eastern Orthodox Church, 40 from Evangelical Church, 27 from Calvinist Church, 11 from Other, 11 from Ad hoc movements, 10 from Jehovah's Witnesses, 7 from Other and not ascertained christian church, 6 from Paganism and natural spirituality, 6 from Buddhism, 3 from Christian Congregations in Slovakia, 2 from Jewish community, 2 from Islam, 2 from Czechoslovak Hussite Church and 1 from Apostolic Church.

== Government ==
The town has its own birth registry and police force.

== Economy and facilities ==
Chemko is chemical plant which produced polychlorinated biphenyls PCBs) (until 1984) and contaminated a large part of East Slovakia, especially sediments of Laborec river and reservoir Zemplínska šírava.

The town has a number of food stores, a doctors' surgery, an outpatient facility for children and adolescents, and a resident dentist. It also has a Slovak commercial bank and insurance company.

== Culture ==
The town has a public library, a disco bar called Broadway, an Ice-rink and a football pitch. It also has a DVD rental store and a town cinema. In the town park is an old manor-house and the oldest Lime-tree in Slovakia.

== Transport ==
The town has a railway station and bus station.

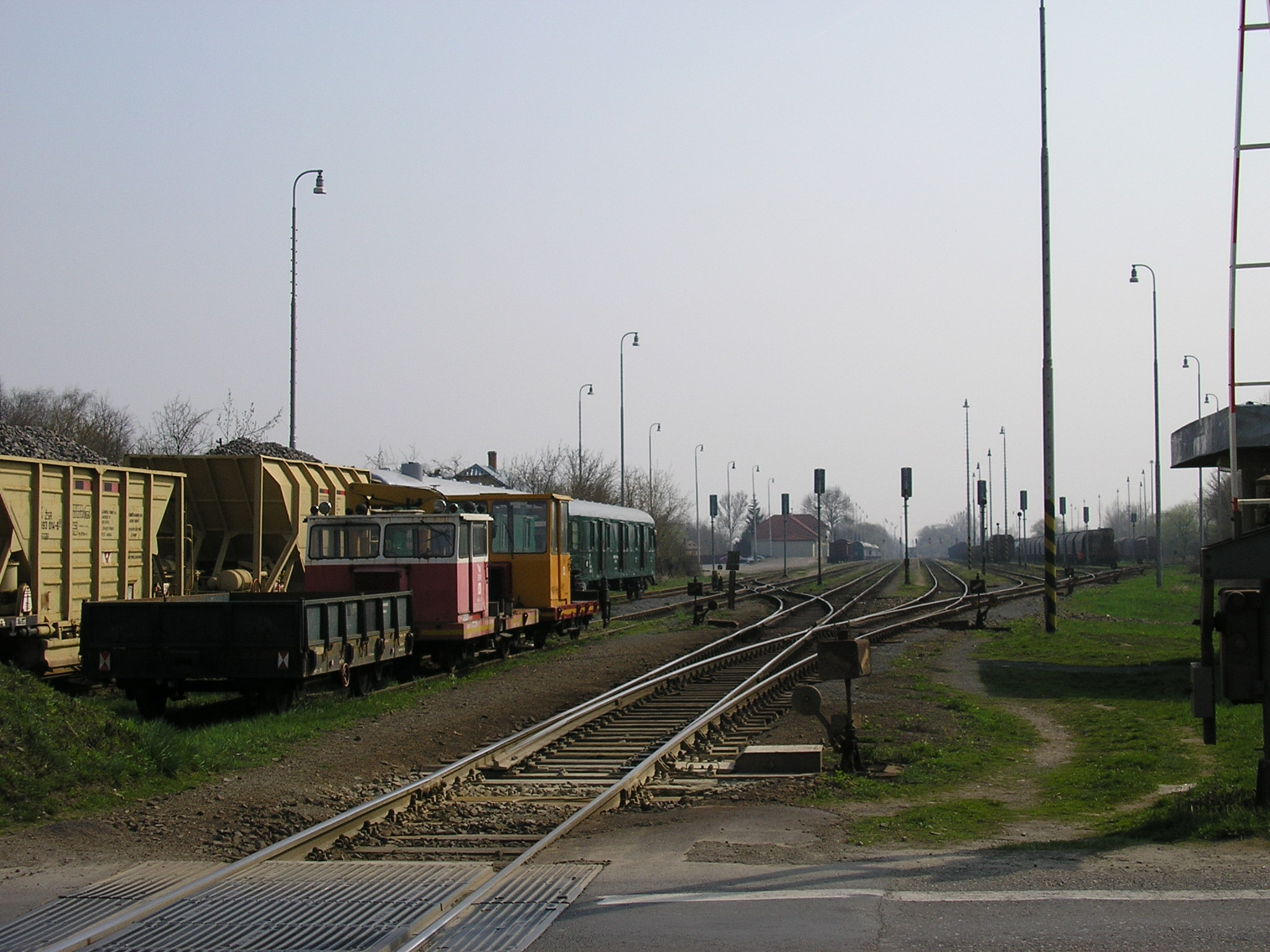
Strážske railway station

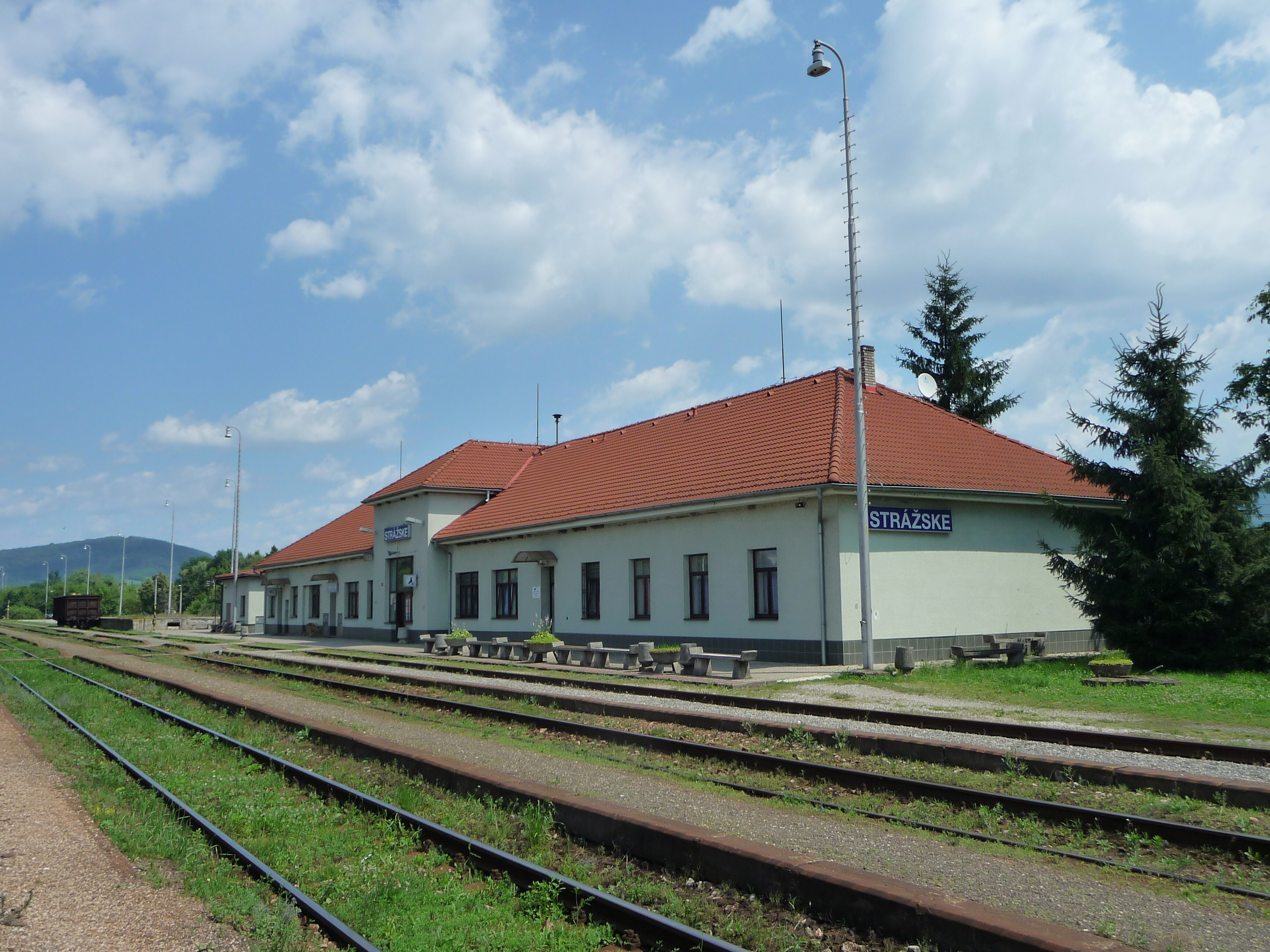
Strážske railway station

== Twin towns — sister cities ==
Strážske is twinned with:

- Nieporęt, Poland
- Drahanská vrchovina, Czech Republic
- Dolna Banya, Bulgaria
