= Shepherds of the Romans =

Ancient Carpathian Basin people

The "shepherds of the Romans" (Latin: pastores Romanorum) were a population living in the Carpathian Basin at the time of the Hungarian conquest of the territory around 900, according to the Gesta Hungarorum and other medieval sources.

== Hungary: the pasturing land of the Romans ==
The identification of the lowlands east of the Middle Danube as pasturing lands was first recorded in Emperor Constantine VII's De administrando imperio ("On Administering the Empire") in connection with the towns of Dalmatia. The Emperor wrote that "the Avars had their haunts on the far side of the river Danube", adding that the Dalmatians saw "the beasts and men on the far side of the river" when they visited the borderlands. In contrast with the Byzantine Emperor, Odo of Deuil who marched through Hungary in 1147 mentioned that the lands west of the river were said to have been the pasturing lands of Julius Caesar.

According to an early 13th-century report by one Friar Ricardus, a lost Hungarian chronicle—The Deeds of the Christian Hungarians—stated that Hungary had been called the pasturing lands of the Romans before the Magyars conquered it. The identification of Hungary as the one-time pascua Romanorum ("the Romans' pasturing lands") was also mentioned in the Rhymed Chronicle of Stična from the 1240s, in Thomas the Archdeacon's History of the Bishops of Salona and Split, which was written after 1250, and in the Anonymi descriptio Europae orientalis from the early 14th century. On the other hand, Simon of Kéza and the 14th-century Hungarian chronicles did not refer to Hungary as the Romans' pasturing land. Instead, they wrote of the "shepherds and husbandmen" or the "farm-workers and shepherds" of the Roman citizens of Pannonia, Pamphylia, Macedonia, Dalmatia and Phrygia who stayed behind when their masters fled from these Roman provinces after the arrival of the Huns.

== The Romans' shepherds ==
According to the chapter 9 of the Gesta Hungarorum, Rus' princes informed the Magyars who marched by Kiev towards "Pannonia" that in that land "there lived the Slavs, Bulgarians, Vlachs, and the shepherds of the Romans" (quam terram habitarent Sclavi, Bulgarii et Blachii ac pastores Romanorum). The anonymus author of the Gesta added that "after the death of King Attila, the Romans said the land of Pannonia was pastureland because their flocks grazed in the land of Pannonia".

== See also ==
- Pannonian Romance
- Dalmatian city-states

== Sources ==
=== Primary sources ===
- Anonymus, Notary of King Béla: The Deeds of the Hungarians (Edited, Translated and Annotated by Martyn Rady and László Veszprémy) (2010). In: Rady, Martyn; Veszprémy, László; Bak, János M. (2010); Anonymus and Master Roger; CEU Press; ISBN 978-963-9776-95-1.
- Constantine Porphyrogenitus: De Administrando Imperio (Greek text edited by Gyula Moravcsik, English translation by Romillyi J. H. Jenkins) (1967). Dumbarton Oaks Center for Byzantine Studies. ISBN 0-88402-021-5.
- Simon of Kéza: The Deeds of the Hungarians (Edited and translated by László Veszprémy and Frank Schaer with a study by Jenő Szűcs) (1999). CEU Press. ISBN 963-9116-31-9.
- The Hungarian Illuminated Chronicle: Chronica de Gestis Hungarorum (Edited by Dezső Dercsényi) (1970). Corvina, Taplinger Publishing. ISBN 0-8008-4015-1.

=== Secondary sources ===
- Györffy, György (1988). Anonymus: Rejtély vagy történeti forrás [Anonymous: An Enigma or a Source for History] (in Hungarian). Akadémiai Kiadó. ISBN 963-05-4868-2.
- Kristó, Gyula (1983). Tanulmányok az Árpád-korról, 5. fejezet: Rómaiak és vlachok Nyesztornál és Anonymusnál [Romans and Vlachs in Nestor's and Anonymus's Works] (in Hungarian). Magvető Könyvkiadó. ISBN 963-271-890-9.
- Macartney, C. A. (1953). The Medieval Hungarian Historians: A Critical & Analytical Guide. Cambridge University Press. ISBN 978-0-521-08051-4.
- Madgearu, Alexandru (2005). The Romanians in the Anonymous Gesta Hungarorum: Truth and Fiction. Romanian Cultural Institute, Center for Transylvanian Studies. ISBN 973-7784-01-4.
- Spinei, Victor (2009). The Romanians and the Turkic Nomads North of the Danube Delta from the Tenth to the Mid-Thirteenth century. Koninklijke Brill NV. ISBN 978-90-04-17536-5.
