= Gesta Hungarorum =

First extant Hungarian book about history

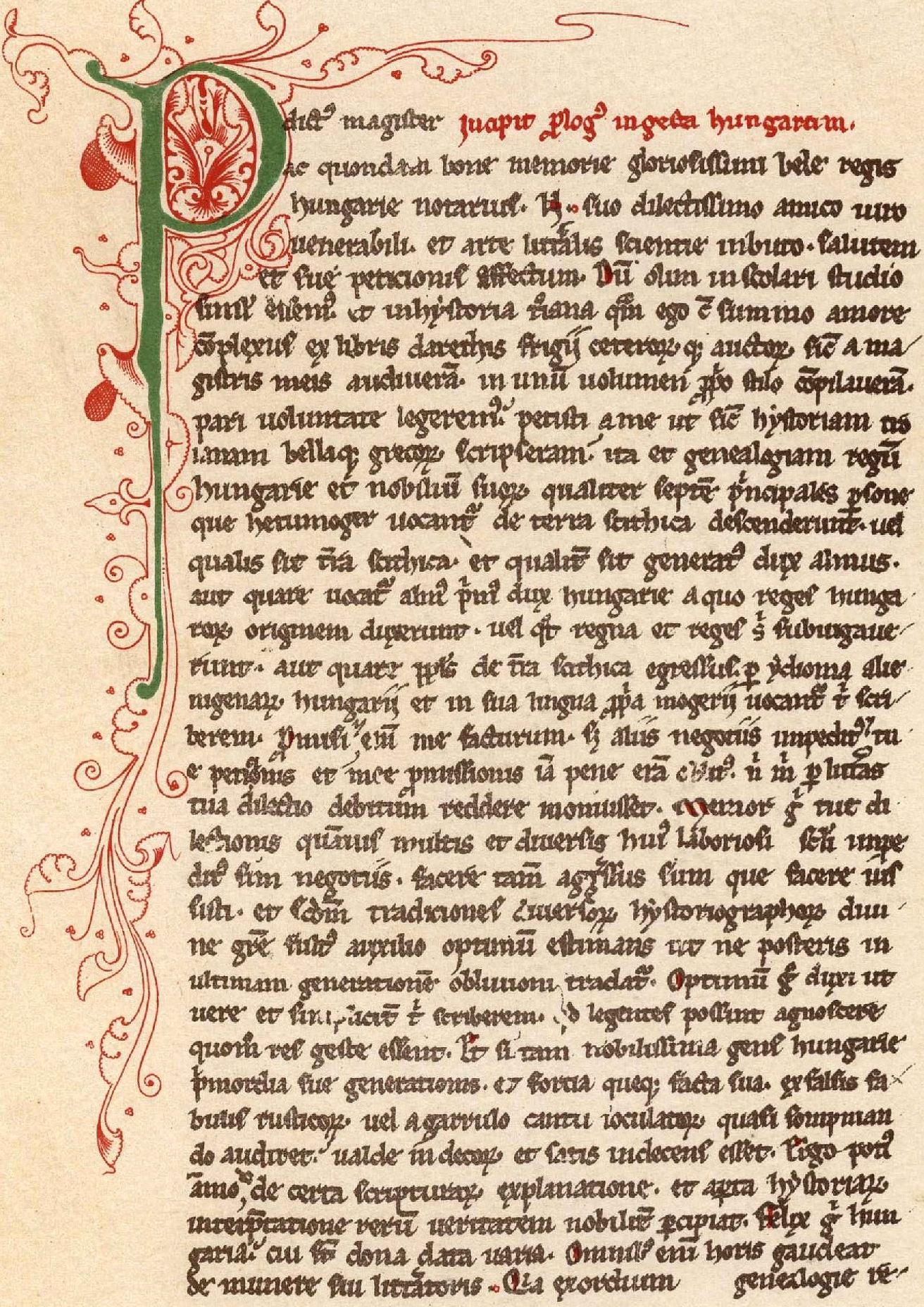
First page of the manuscript written in Medieval Latin

Gesta Hungarorum, or The Deeds of the Hungarians, is the earliest Hungarian chronicle which has survived for posterity. It was written in Latin by an unidentified author who has traditionally been called Anonymus in scholarly works. According to most historians, the work was completed between around 1200 and 1230. The Gesta exists in a sole manuscript from the second part of the 13th century, which was for centuries held in Vienna. It is part of the collection of Széchényi National Library in Budapest.

The principal subject of the Gesta is the Hungarian conquest of the Carpathian Basin at the turn of the 9th and 10th centuries, and it writes of the origin of the Hungarians, identifying the Hungarians' ancestors with the ancient Scythians and Huns. Many of its sources—including the Bible, Isidore of Seville's Etymologiae, the 7th-century Exordia Scythica, the late 9th-century Regino of Prüm's Chronicon, and early medieval romances of Alexander the Great—have been identified by scholars. Anonymus also used folk songs and ballads when writing his work. He knew a version of the late 11th-century "Hungarian Chronicle" the text of which has partially been preserved in his work and in later chronicles, but his narration of the Hungarian Conquest differs from the version provided by the other chronicles. Anonymus did not mention the opponents of the conquering Hungarians known from sources written around 900, but he wrote of the Hungarians' fight against rulers unknown from other sources. According to a scholarly theory, he used place names when naming the opponents of the Hungarians.

== Background ==
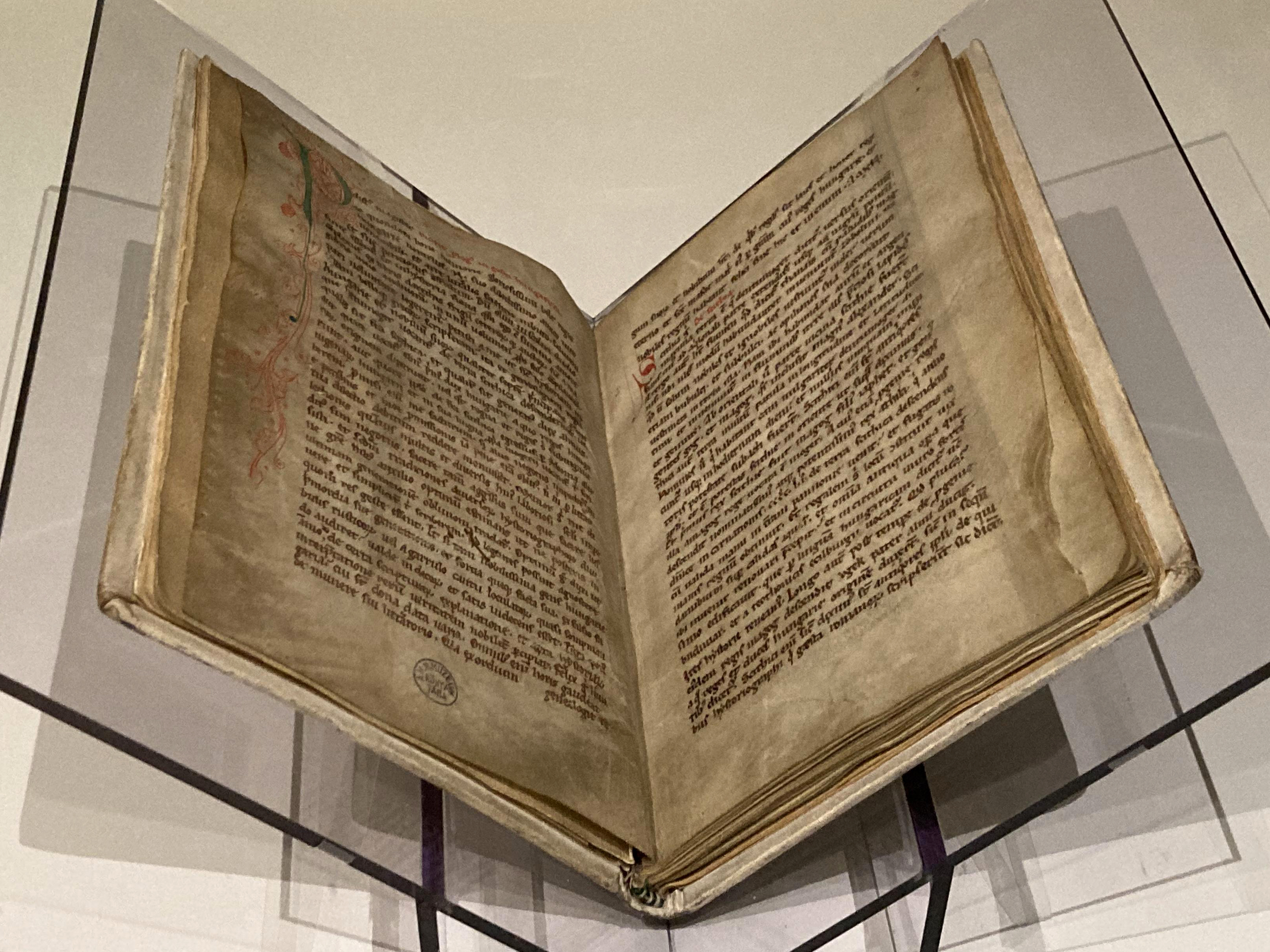
The Gesta Hungarorum

Although the Hungarians, or Magyars, seem to have used their own alphabet before adopting Christianity in the 11th century, most information of their early history was recorded by Muslim, Byzantine and Western European authors. For instance, the Annals of Fulda, Regino of Prüm's Chronicon, and Emperor Constantine VII's De administrando imperio contain contemporaneous or nearly contemporaneous reports of their conquest of the Carpathian Basin at the turn of the 9th and 10th centuries. Among the Hungarians, oral tradition—songs and ballads—preserved the memory of the most important historical events. The Illuminated Chronicle explicitly stated that the "seven captains" who led the Hungarians during the Conquest "composed lays about themselves and sang them among themselves in order to win worldly renown and to publish their names abroad, so that their posterity might be able to boast and brag to neighbours and friends when these songs were heard".

The Gesta Hungarorum, or The Deeds of the Hungarians, is the first extant Hungarian chronicle. Its principal subject is the conquest of the Carpathian Basin and it narrates the background and the immediate aftermath of the conquest. Many historians—including Carlile Aylmer Macartney and András Róna-Tas—agree that Simon of Kéza's chronicle (the Gesta Hunnorum et Hungarorum, named so to differentiate it from this work), the Illuminated Chronicle and other works composed in the 13th–15th centuries preserved texts which had been written before the completion of the Gesta. They say that the first "Hungarian Chronicle" was completed in the second half of the 11th century or in the early 12th century. The existence of this ancient chronicle is proven by later sources. One Ricardus's report of a journey of a group of Dominican friars in the early 1230s refers to a chronicle, The Deeds of the Christian Hungarians, which contained information of an eastern Magna Hungaria. The Illuminated Chronicle from 1358 refers to "the ancient books about the deeds of the Hungarians" in connection with the pagan uprisings of the 11th century. The earliest "Hungarian Chronicle" was expanded and rewritten several times in the 12th–14th centuries, but its content can only be reconstructed based on 14th-century works.

== Manuscript ==
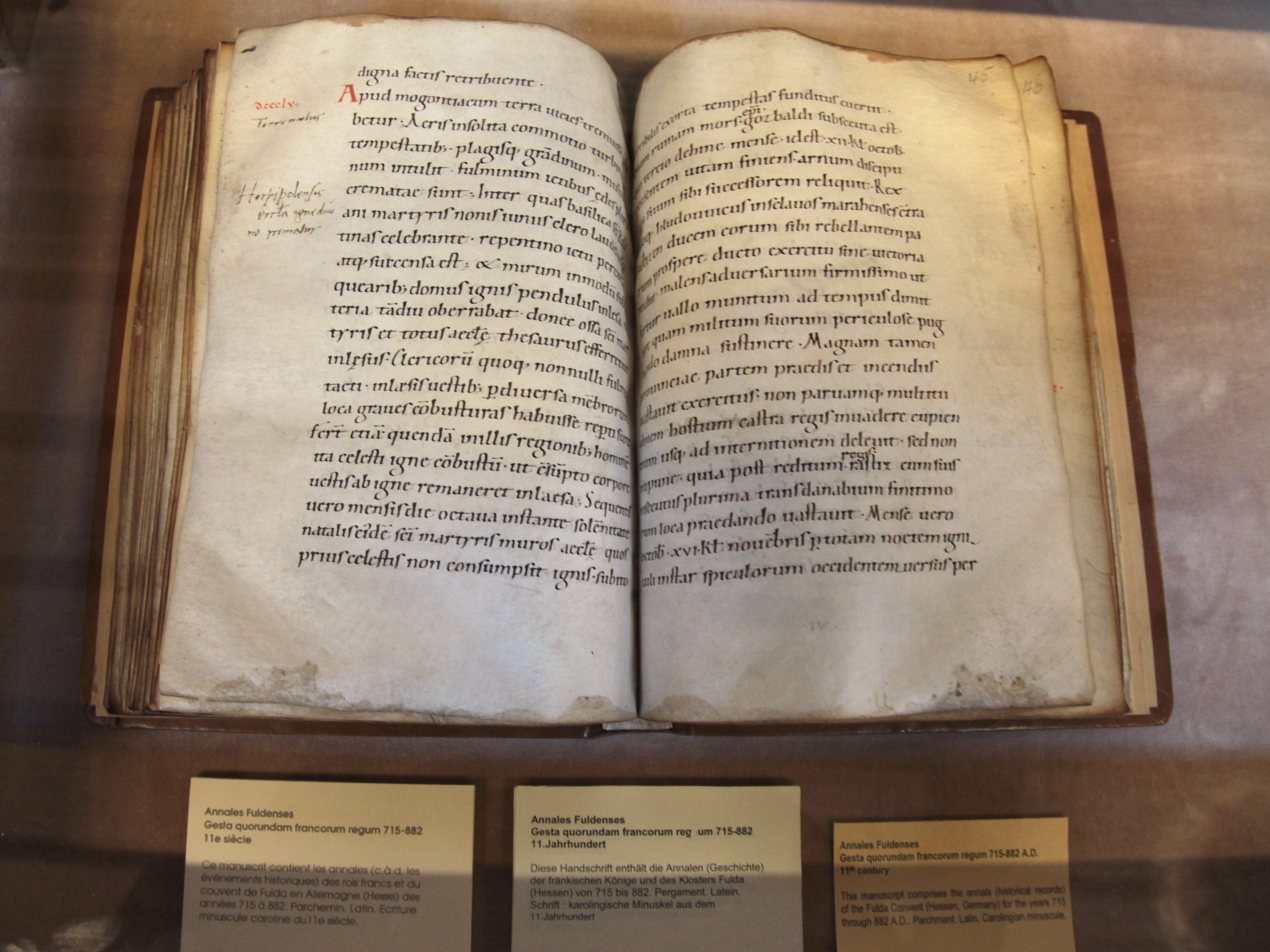
An 11th-century copy of the Annals of Fulda—an important contemporaneous source of the Hungarian conquest of the Carpathian Basin

The work exists in a sole manuscript. The codex is 17 by 24 centimetres (0.56 ft × 0.79 ft) in size and contains 24 folios, including two blank pages. The first page of the codex originally contained the beginning of the Gesta. It was blanked because the scribe had made mistakes when writing the text. The work was written in a Gothic minuscule. The style of the letters and decorations, including the elaborate initial on its first page, shows that the manuscript was completed in the middle or in the second part of the 13th century. Scribal errors suggest that the extant manuscript is a copy of the original work. For instance, the scribe wrote Cleopatram instead of Neopatram in the text narrating a Hungarian raid in the Byzantine Empire although the context clearly shows that the author of the Gesta referred to Neopatras (now Ypati in Greece).

The history of the manuscript up until the early 17th century is unknown. It became part of the collection of the Imperial Library in Vienna between 1601 and 1636. In this period, the court librarian Sebastian Tengnagel registered it under the title Historia Hungarica de VII primis ducibus Hungariae auctore Belae regis notario ("Hungarian History of the First Seven Princes of Hungary Written by King Béla's Notary"). Tengnagel added numbers to the folios and the chapters. The codex was bound with a leather book cover, impressed with a double-headed eagle, in the late 18th century. The manuscript, which was transferred to Hungary in 1933 or 1934, is held in the Széchényi National Library in Budapest.

== The author ==
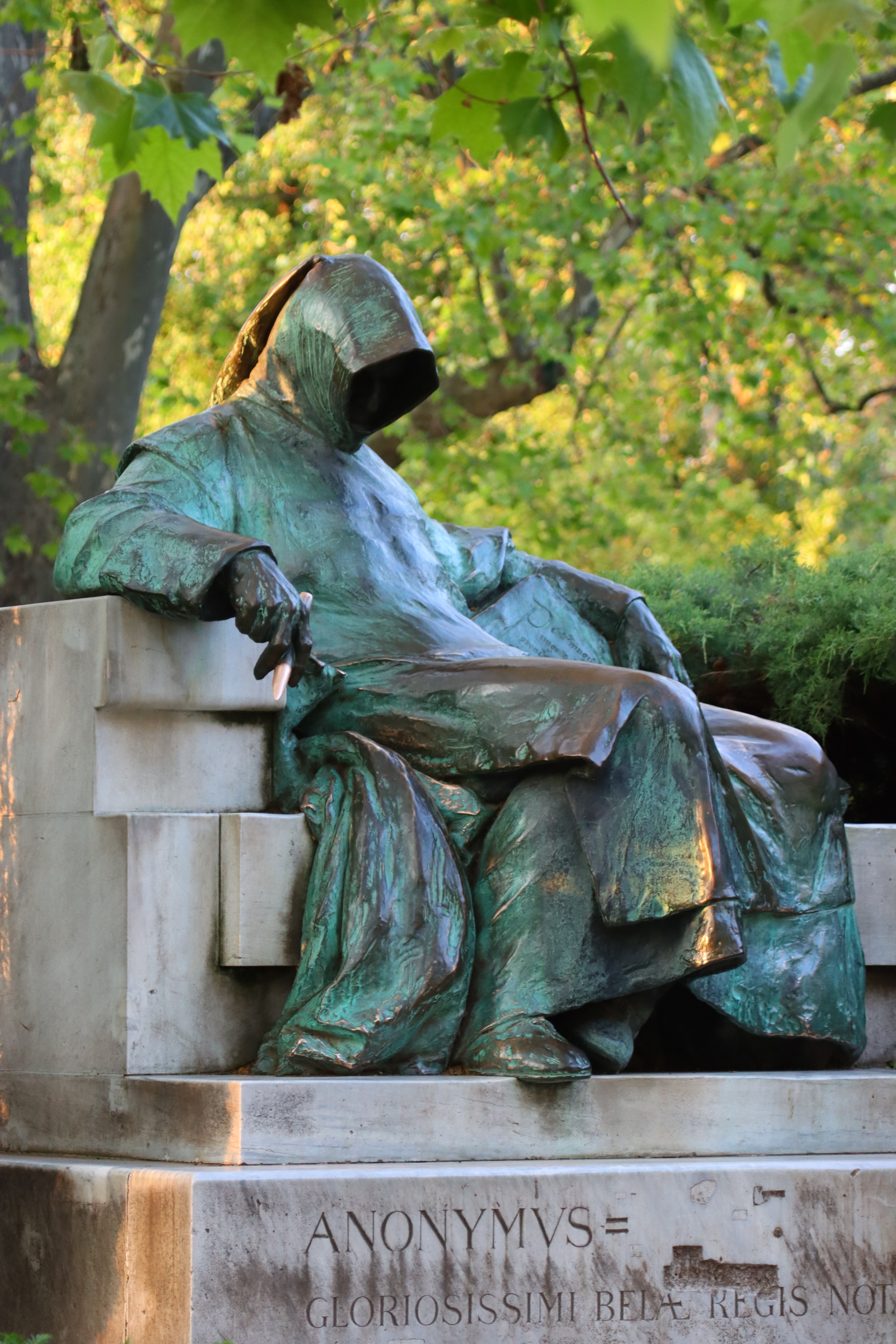
Statue of Anonymus, the author of the Gesta Hungarorum in Vajdahunyad Castle in Budapest. (Miklós Ligeti, 1903)

The author of the Gesta Hungarorum has been known as Anonymus ever since the publication of the first Hungarian translation of his work in 1790. The author described himself as "P who is called magister, and sometime notary of the most glorious Béla, king of Hungary of fond memory" in the opening sentence of the Gesta. The identification of this King Béla is subject to scholarly debate, because four Hungarian monarchs bore this name. Most historians identify the king with Béla III of Hungary who died in 1196.

Anonymus dedicated his work to "the most venerable man N" who had been his schoolmate in an unspecified school. Anonymus mentioned that they had found pleasure in reading the Trojan History, a work attributed to Dares Phrygius, which enjoyed popularity in the Middle Ages. He also referred to a work of the Trojan War that he had "brought most lovingly together into one volume" upon his masters' instructions. Anonymus stated that he had decided to write of "the genealogy of the kings of Hungary and of their noblemen" because he had no knowledge of any decent account of the Hungarian Conquest. According to scholars who identify Anonymus as King Béla III's notary, he wrote his Gesta around 1200 or in the first decades of the 13th century.

The study of place names mentioned in the Gesta suggests that Anonymus had a detailed knowledge both of the wider region of Óbuda and Csepel Island (in and to the south of present-day Budapest) and of the lands along the upper courses of the river Tisza. For instance, he mentioned a dozen places—settlements, ferries and streams—in the former region, including "a small river that flows through a stone culvert" to Óbuda. He did not write of the southern and eastern parts of Transylvania.

== Sources ==
Minstrels and folk-singers reciting heroic songs were well-known figures of the age of Anonymus. He explicitly referred to "the gabbling rhymes of minstrels and the spurious tales of peasants who have not forgotten the brave deeds and wars of the Hungarians" even to his time. However, he did not conceal his scorn for oral tradition, stating that it "would be most unworthy and completely unfitting for the so most noble people of Hungary to hear as if in sleep of the beginning of their kind and of their bravery and deeds from the false stories of peasants and the gabbling song of minstrels". All the same, stylistic elements (including formulaic repetitions which can be found in his text) imply that he occasionally used heroic songs. According to Kristó, the legend of Emese's dream of the "falcon that seemed to come to her and impregnate her" was one of the motifs that Anonymus borrowed from oral tradition.

Anonymus, as Macartney says, claimed to "rely solely on written sources, as alone trustworthy" when writing his work. Among his sources, Anonymus explicitly mentioned the Bible and Dares Phrygius's Trojan History. He borrowed texts from the latter work and adopted its "overall structure of short but informative accounts naming important protagonists and main events", according to historians Martyn Rady and László Veszprémy. Anonymus also referred to "historians writing of the deeds of the Romans" when narrating the history of the Scythians. According to Kristó, Györffy and Thoroczkay, Anonymus obviously read the so-called Exordia Scythica ("Scythian Genesis"), a 7th-century abridgement of a work of the 2nd-century historian, Justin.

Anonymus used Regino of Prüm's Chronicon, that he mentioned as "the annals of chronicles" in his Gesta. He accepted Regino of Prüm's view when identifying the Scythians as the Hungarians' ancestors. Sometimes, he misinterpreted his sources. For instance, he wrote of "the boundaries of the Caranthians of the Mura" (Carinthinorum Moroanensium fines) instead of the "lands of the Carinthians, Moravians" (Carantenorum, Marahensium ... fines) of which he read in Regino of Prüm's Chronicon, which shows that Anonymus did not understand Regino of Prüm's reference to the Moravians.

Direct borrowings from Isidore of Seville's Etymologiae, Hugh of Bologna's Rationes dictandi prosaice, and medieval romances about Alexander the Great prove that Anonymus also used these works. According to Macartney, textual coincidences show that Anonymus adopted parts of late 12th-century chronicles narrating Frederick Barbarossa's crusade. For instance, Anonymus' descriptions of tournaments seem to have been taken from Arnold of Lübeck's Chronicle of the Slavs.

Anonymus also used the ancient "Hungarian Chronicle" or its sources. However, there are differences between Anonymus' narration of the Hungarian Conquest and other works preserving texts from the ancient chronicle. For instance, the Illuminated Chronicle wrote of the Hungarians' arrival in Transylvania across the Carpathian Mountains from the east at the beginning of the Conquest, but according to Anonymus the Hungarians invaded Transylvania across the valleys of the Meseş Mountains from the west at a later stage.

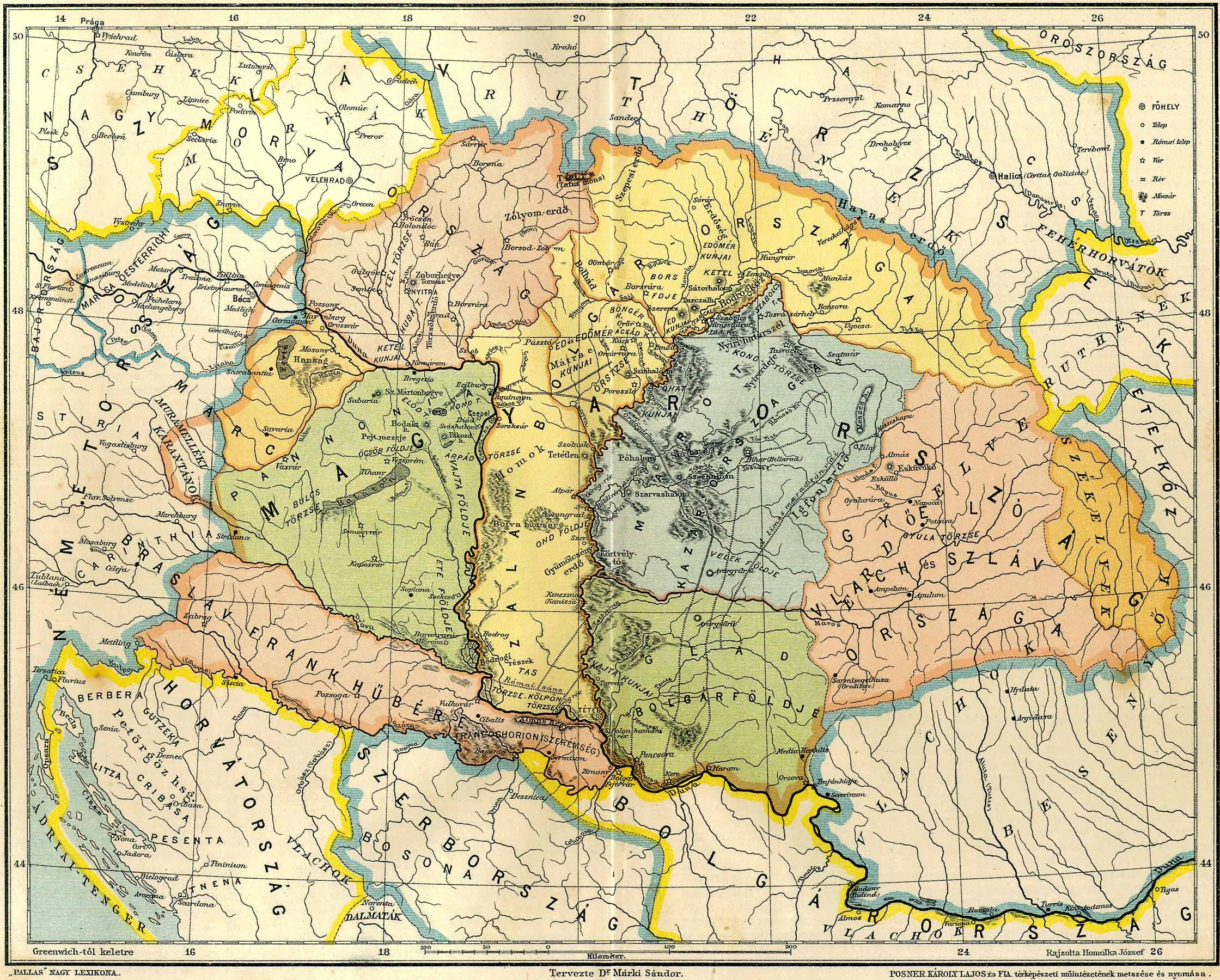
A map which depicts the Carpathian Basin on the eve of the Hungarian Conquest taking into account the narration of the Gesta Hungarorum

Sources from the turn of the 9th and 10th centuries mentioned more than a dozen persons who played an important role in the history of the Carpathian Basin at the time of the Hungarian Conquest. Anonymus did not mention any of them; he did not refer, for instance, to Emperor Arnulf of Carinthia, Boris I of Bulgaria, and Svatopluk I of Moravia. On the other hand, none of the persons whom Anonymus listed among the opponents of the conquering Hungarians—for instance, the Bulgarian Salan, the Khazar Menumorut and the Vlach Gelou—were mentioned in other sources. According to Györffy, Engel, and other historians, Anonymus either invented these personalities or listed them anachronistically among the conquering Hungarians' opponents. Martyn Rady and László Veszprémy explicitly describe the Gesta Hungarorum as a " 'toponymic romance' that seeks to explain place-names by reference to imagined events or persons, and vice versa." For instance, Györffy writes that Gelou's story was based on the conquest of Gyula of Transylvania's realm by Stephen I of Hungary in the early 11th century and Gelou was named after the town Gilău where he was killed in battle, according to Anonymus. Anonymus likewise wrote that the Bulgarian Laborec had died at the River Laborec and the Czech Zubur on the Mount Zobor near Nitra.

Anonymus did not allude to the Hungarians' decisive victory over the united Bavarian forces in the Battle of Pressburg in 907, but he narrated battles unknown from other works. Anonymus seems to have applied place names when creating these battles, according to Győrffy. For instance, the Gesta Hungarorum wrote of a battle between the Greeks and the Hungarians at a ford by the River Tisza which was named after this event as "Ford of the Greeks", according to Anonymus, although it received this name after its revenues were granted to the Greek Orthodox monastery of Sremska Mitrovica in the 12th century.

Late 9th-century sources mentioned the Avars, the Bavarians, the Bulgarians, the Danubian Slavs, the Gepids and the Moravians among the peoples inhabiting the Carpathian Basin. Anonymus did not mention the Avars, the Bavarians, the Gepids and the Moravians, but he listed the Czechs, the Greeks, the Khazars, the "Romans" and their shepherds, the Székelys, and the Vlachs besides the Bulgarians and the Slavs. According to Györffy and Madgearu, Anonymus may have based his list of the peoples inhabiting the Carpathian Basin on the local Slavs' oral tradition which was preserved in the early 12th-century Russian Primary Chronicle. The latter source described the Slavs as the first settlers in the Carpathian Basin and mentioned that they were conquered by the "Volokhi" before the Hungarians arrived and expelled the Volokhi. According to Györffy, Kristó and other historians, Anonymus misinterpreted his source when identifying the Volokhi with the Vlachs, because the Volokhi were actually Franks who occupied Pannonia, but the Hungarians expelled them during the Conquest. But Spinei, Pop and other historians write that Russian Primary Chronicle confirms Anonymus's report of the Hungarians' fight against the Vlachs. Madgearu, who does not associate the Volokhi with the Vlachs, emphasizes that Anonymous "had no interest to invent the presence of the [Vlachs] in Transylvania in the 10th century, because if [Vlachs] had indeed arrived there in the 12th century, his readers would not have believed this assertion". Györffy says that the Vlachs, Cumans, Czechs and other peoples whose presence in the late-9th-century Carpathian Basin cannot be proven based on sources from the same period reflects the situation of the late 13th century.

== Structure ==
The Gesta contains a prologue and 57 chapters.

In the prologue, Anonymus introduced himself and declared that he decided to write his work to put in writing the early history of the Hungarians and their conquest of the Carpathian Basin. In addition, he stated that he wanted to write of the genealogy of the royal Árpád dynasty and of the noble families of the Kingdom of Hungary.

The first seven chapters describe the Hungarians' legendary homeland—mentioned as Scythia or Dentumoger—and their departure from there. According to Macartney, the first chapter was based on the late 11th-century "Hungarian Chronicle", and it contains interpolations from the Exordia Scythica and Regino of Prüm's chronicle. The second chapter explains that the Hungarians were named after "Hunguar" (present-day Uzhhorod in Ukraine). The third chapter preserved the totemistic pre-Christian tradition of the origin of the Árpád dynasty, narrating Emese's dream of the falcon impregnating her before the birth of her son, Álmos. The next section describes Álmos, mentioning that he was "more powerful and wiser than all the princes of Scythia", which may have derived from oral tradition or from the common wording of contemporaneous legal documents. The fifth chapter writes of the election of Álmos as "the leader and master" of the Hungarians, mentioning a blood-mingling ceremony. In this section, Anonymus states that the Hungarians "chose to seek for themselves the land of Pannonia that they had heard from rumor had been the land of King Attila" whom Anonymus describes as Álmos's forefather. The next chapter narrates the oath that the leaders of the Hungarians took after Álmos's election, including the confirmation of the hereditary right of Álmos's descendants to rule and the right of his electors and his electors' offspring to hold the highest offices in the realm. In the seventh chapter, Anonymus writes of the Hungarians' departure from Scythia and their route across the river "Etil" and "Russia which is called Suzdal" to Kiev.

The next four sections of the Gesta describe the fights of the Hungarians with the Rus' people and the "Cumans". Anonymus's report of the Hungarians' passing by Kiev was based on the ancient "Hungarian Chronicle", according to Macartney. References to the Hungarians' march by Kiev towards the Carpathian Basin can also be found in the Russian Primary Chronicle, and in Simon of Kéza's and Henry of Mügeln's chronicles. In an attempt to make his work more entertaining, Anonymus supplemented this information with vivid battle-scenes borrowed from the Trojan History and the romances about Alexander the Great, according to Macartney. Anonymus mentions an alliance between the Rus' people and the "Cumans" against the Hungarians. Macartney, Györffy, Spinei and many other historians agree that he misinterpreted the Hungarian word kun, which originally designated all nomadic Turkic peoples, and wrongly identified the Kuns mentioned in one of his sources with the Cumans of his age. The latter had at least twice supported the Rus' princes against the Hungarian monarchs in the 12th century, which explains Anonymus's mistake. The ninth chapter of the Gesta describes the submission of the Rus' and "Cuman" princes to Álmos. Anonymus also writes how seven Cuman chieftains joined the Hungarians, which may have preserved the memory of the integration of the Kabars in the Hungarian tribal alliance based on oral tradition of the noble families of Kabar origin, according to Györffy.

== Reception and editions ==
The existence of a sole manuscript of the Gesta Hungarorum shows that the chronicle "was not very popular during either its author's lifetime or the subsequent centuries", according to historian Florin Curta. For instance, the contemporary 13th century Friar Julian and his Dominican brethren studied a century earlier work: The Deeds of the Christian Hungarians instead of Anonymus's work before departing for the ancient homeland of the Magyars in the early 1230s. Later chronicles did not use the Gesta, suggesting that Anonymus's contemporaries knew that he had invented most details of his account of the Hungarian Conquest, according to Gyula Kristó.

The Gesta was first published as the first volume of the series Scriptores rerum Hungaricarum in 1746 by Johann Georg von Schwandtner. Matthias Bél wrote a preface to this first edition. Professors of the Universities of Halle and Göttingen soon raised their doubts about the reliability of the Gesta, emphasizing, for instance, the anachronistic description of the Rus' principalities. The Slovak scholar Juraj Sklenár dismissed Anonymus's work in the 1780s, pointing out that Anonymus failed to mention Great Moravia..

When demanding the emancipation of the Romanians of Transylvania in the late 18th century, the authors of the Supplex Libellus Valachorum referred to Anonymus's work. Anonymus's three heroes—Gelou, Glad and Menumorut—play a preeminent role in Romanian historiography. Romanian historians have presented them as Romanian rulers whose presence in the Gesta proves the existence of Romanian polities in the territory of present-day Romania at the time of the Hungarian Conquest. The Romanian government even published a full-page advertisement about the reliability of Anonymus's reference to the Romanians in The Times in 1987.

The view of modern historians on the Gesta Hungarorum is mixed: some consider it a reliable source; others consider its information doubtful. Alexandru Madgearu, who wrote a monography of the Gesta Hungarorum, concluded that the "analysis of several fragments of" the Gesta Hungarorum "has demonstrated that this work is generally credible, even if it ignores important events and characters and even if it makes some chronological mistakes". According to Neagu Djuvara, professor of international law and economic history, the factual accuracy of Anonymus's work is likely high, because it is the earliest preserved Hungarian chronicle and is based on even older Hungarian chronicles. On the other hand, Carlile Aylmer Macartney described Anonymus's work as "the most famous, the most obscure, the most exasperating and most misleading of all the early Hungarian texts" in his book of medieval Hungarian historians. Carlile Aylmer Macartney writes in his critical and analytical guide of Anonymus "this is not evidence that he introduced the whole person of Gelou or the presence of Vlachs in Transylvania". Paul Robert Magocsi also regarded the Gesta as an unreliable work. Romanian-British historian Dennis Deletant joins the opinion that it is a debatable chronicle, criticizing how Anonymous has the Hungarians fighting Bulgarians while making no mention of the Moravians, Carinthians, Franks and Bavarians, and also his reliance upon legends and historical tradition than facts, such as in the parts where he makes the dubious claim that the Hungarian leader Almos was descended from Attila. Deletant further concludes that the cases for and against the existence of Gelou and the Vlachs simply cannot be proven. Martyn Rady, the translator of the first English version of the Gesta, states that "It is at best to project contemporary conditions backwards."

== See also ==
- List of Hungarian chronicles
- Gesta Hunnorum et Hungarorum
- Chronicon Pictum
- Buda Chronicle
- Chronica Hungarorum
- Epitome rerum Hungarorum
- Nádasdy Mausoleum
- Gallus Anonymus
- Hungarian prehistory
- Seven chieftains of the Magyars
- Turul
- Árpád dynasty
- Principality of Hungary

== Sources ==
=== Primary sources ===
- Anonymus, Notary of King Béla: The Deeds of the Hungarians (Edited, Translated and Annotated by Martyn Rady and László Veszprémy) (2010). In: Rady, Martyn; Veszprémy, László; Bak, János M. (2010); Anonymus and Master Roger; CEU Press; ISBN 978-963-9776-95-1.
- Silagi, Gabriel (1991). Die "Gesta Hungarorum" des anonymen Notars. Ungarns Geschichtsschreiber (in German). Vol. 4. Sigmaringen: Jan Thorbecke. ISBN 3-7995-2910-1. (critical edition with German translation).
- The Chronicle of Regino of Prüm (2009). In: History and Politics in Late Carolingian and Ottonian Europe: The Chronicle of Regino of Prüm and Adalbert of Magdeburg (Translated and annotated by Simon MacLean); Manchester University Press; ISBN 978-0-7190-7135-5.
- The Hungarian Illuminated Chronicle: Chronica de Gestis Hungarorum (Edited by Dezső Dercsényi) (1970). Corvina, Taplinger Publishing. ISBN 0-8008-4015-1.

=== Secondary sources ===
- Armbruster, Adolf (1972). Romanitatea românilor: Istoria unei idei [The Romanity of the Romanians: The History of an Idea]. Romanian Academy Publishing House.
- Berend, Nora; Urbańczyk, Przemysław; Wiszewski, Przemysław (2013). Central Europe in the High Middle Ages: Bohemia, Hungary and Poland, c. 900-c. 1300. Cambridge University Press. ISBN 978-0-521-78156-5.
- Boia, Lucian (2001). History and Myth in Romanian Consciousness (Translated by James Christian Brown). CEU Press. ISBN 963-9116-96-3.
- Curta, Florin (2006). Southeastern Europe in the Middle Ages, 500–1250. Cambridge University Press. ISBN 978-0-521-89452-4.
- Deletant, Dennis (1992). "Ethnos and Mythos in the History of Transylvania: the case of the chronicler Anonymus". In Péter, László (ed.). Historians and the History of Transylvania. Boulder. pp. 67–85. ISBN 0-88033-229-8.
- Djuvara, Neagu (2003). O scurtă istorie a românilor povestită celor tineri (in Romanian). Istros.
- Engel, Pál (2001). The Realm of St Stephen: A History of Medieval Hungary, 895–1526. I.B. Tauris Publishers. ISBN 1-86064-061-3.
- Georgescu, Vlad (1991). The Romanians:A History. Ohio State University Press. ISBN 0-8142-0511-9.
- Györffy, György (1988). Anonymus: Rejtély vagy történeti forrás [Anonymous: An Enigma or a Source for History] (in Hungarian). Akadémiai Kiadó. ISBN 963-05-4868-2.
- Kordé, Zoltán (1994). "Anonymus". In Kristó, Gyula; Engel, Pál; Makk, Ferenc (eds.). Korai magyar történeti lexikon (9–14. század) [Encyclopedia of the Early Hungarian History (9th–14th centuries)] (in Hungarian). Akadémiai Kiadó. pp. 50–51. ISBN 963-05-6722-9.
- Kristó, Gyula (1983). Tanulmányok az Árpád-korról, 14. fejezet: Szempontok Anonymus gestájának megítéléséhez [Studies on the Age of the Árpáds, Chapter 14: Thoughts of the Evaluation of Anonymus's Gesta] (in Hungarian). Magvető Könyvkiadó. ISBN 963-271-890-9.
- Kristó, Gyula (2002). Magyar historiográfia I.: Történetírás a középkori Magyarországon [Hungarian Historiography, Volume I: History in Medieval Hungary] (in Hungarian). Osiris. ISBN 963-389-261-9.
- Macartney, C. A. (1953). The Medieval Hungarian Historians: A Critical & Analytical Guide. Cambridge University Press. ISBN 978-0-521-08051-4. Google Books
- Madgearu, Alexandru (2005). The Romanians in the Anonymous Gesta Hungarorum: Truth and Fiction. Romanian Cultural Institute, Center for Transylvanian Studies. ISBN 973-7784-01-4.
- Magocsi, Paul Robert; Pop, Ivan (1978). The Shaping of a National Identity: Subcarpathian Rus', 1848-1948. Harvard University Press. ISBN 0-674-80579-8.
- Magocsi, Paul Robert; Pop, Ivan (2002). Encyclopedia of Rusyn History and Culture. University of Toronto Press. ISBN 0-8020-3566-3.
- Pop, Ioan-Aurel (2013). "De manibus Valachorum scismaticorum...": Romanians and Power in the Mediaeval Kingdom of Hungary: The Thirteenth and Fourteenth Centuries. Peter Lang. ISBN 978-3-631-64866-7.
- Rady, Martyn; Veszprémy, László (2010). "Introduction". In Bak, János M.; Borkowska, Urszula; Constable, Giles; Jaritz, Gerhard; Klaniczay, Gábor (eds.). Anonymus and Master Roger. CEU Press. pp. xvii–xxxviii. ISBN 978-963-9776-95-1.
- Oța, Silviu (2014). The Mortuary Archaeology of Medieval Banat. Brill. ISBN 978-90-04-21438-5.
- Róna-Tas, András (1999). Hungarians and Europe in the Early Middle Ages: An Introduction to Early Hungarian History (Translated by Nicholas Bodoczky). CEU Press. ISBN 978-963-9116-48-1.
- Spinei, Victor (2009). The Romanians and the Turkic Nomads North of the Danube Delta from the Tenth to the Mid-Thirteenth century. Koninklijke Brill NV. ISBN 978-90-04-17536-5.
- Thoroczkay, Gábor (2009). Írások az Árpád-korról: Történeti és historiográfiai tanulmányok, 7. fejezet: Anonymusról - röviden [On the Age of the Árpáds: Historical and Historiographic Studies, Chapter 7: On Anonymous in short] (in Hungarian). L'Harmattan. ISBN 978-963-236-165-9.
- Ţurcanu, Ion (2007). Istoria românilor [History of the Romanians] (in Romanian). Istros. ISBN 978-973-1871-02-8.
