= Salan =

Supposed 9th century Bulgarian duke

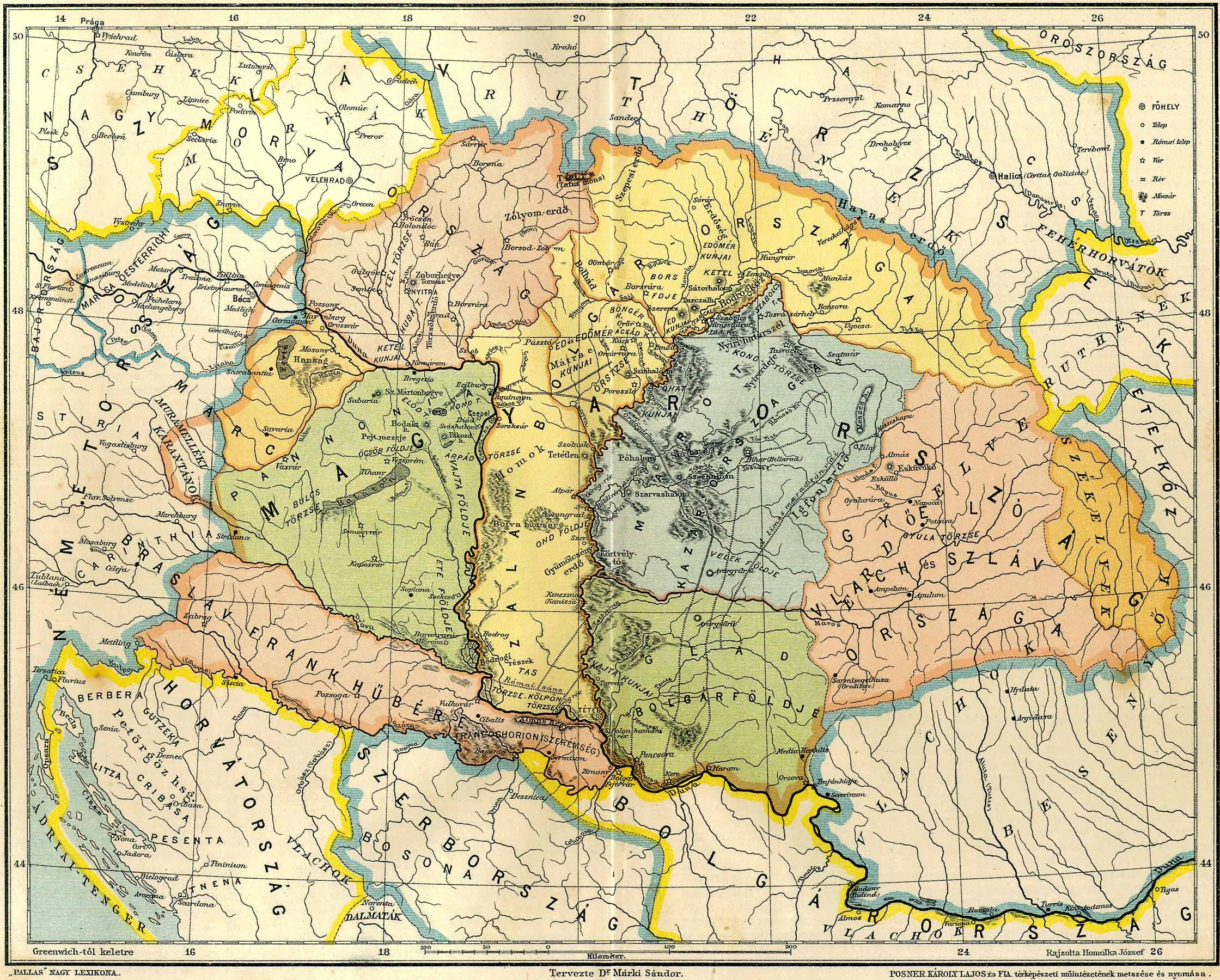
The Carpathian Basin on the eve of the "Hungarian Conquest": a map based primarily on the narration of the Gesta Hungarorum

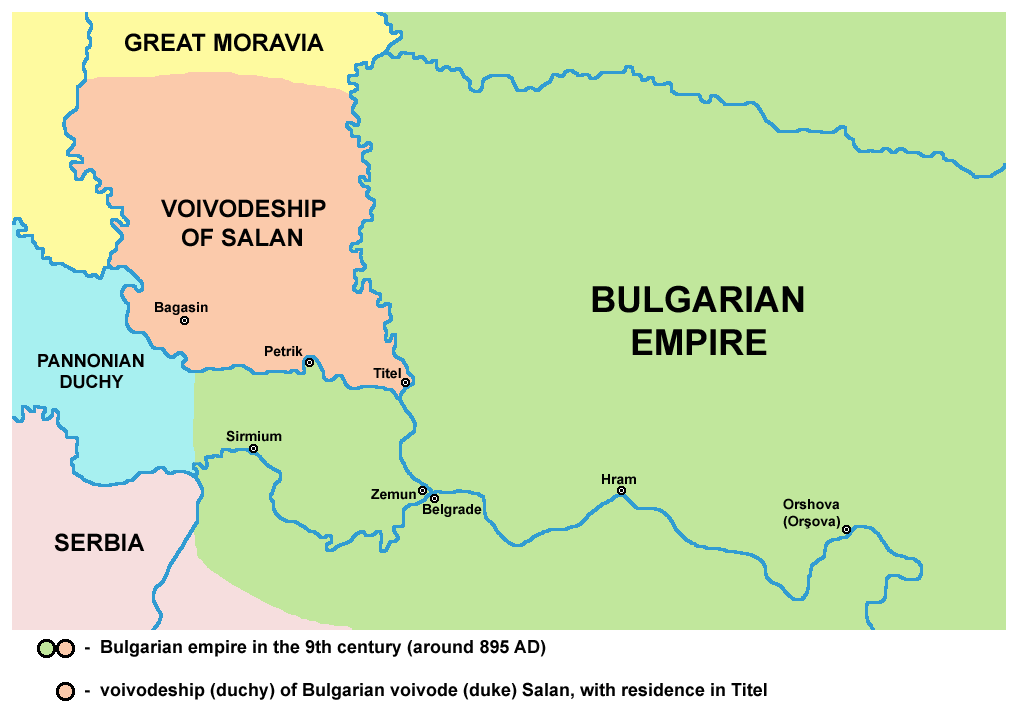
Voivodship (duchy) of Salan according to curug.rastko.net

Salan, Salanus or Zalan (Bulgarian and Serbian Cyrillic: Салан or Залан; Hungarian: Zalán; Latin: Salanus) was, according to the Gesta Hungarorum, a local Bulgarian voivod (duke) who ruled in the 9th century between Danube and Tisa rivers in the south and the Carpathians in the north. The capital of his voivodship (duchy) was Titel. The exact border of his duchy is not clear: according to some sources, his duchy included present-day northern Serbia, much of present-day central Hungary, present-day eastern Slovakia and part of present-day western Ukraine and northern Romania, while according to other sources, his duchy included only present-day Bačka/Bácska region of Serbia and Hungary.

His name comes from the toponym Szalánkemén (archaically Zoloncaman, today Stari Slankamen).

== History ==
According to Gesta Hungarorum, Salan (Salanus) was an Orthodox vassal of the Byzantine Empire or of the Bulgarian tsar. Serbian historian Dr Aleksa Ivić supposes that Salan was a Slavic king. The chronicle states that he was a descendant of the Bulgarian Khan, who conquered the territory up to the borders of Russia and Poland after the death of Attila the Hun.

At the time of the Hungarian conquest (after 896), Hungarians attacked Salan's voivodship and Bulgarians led by the tsar Simeon came to the aid of voivod Salan. Even the Byzantine Emperor sent auxiliary troops against the Hungarians. The Hungarians defeated a united Bulgarian and Byzantine army led by Salan in the early 10th century on the plains of Alpár and the voivodship of Salan fell under Hungarian rule.

== Sources ==
The main historical source about Duke Salan is a historical chronicle known as Gesta Hungarorum, written by Magister P., notary of Hungarian King Bela in the late 12th century. Gesta Hungarorum, however, is not considered to be a fully reliable source, thus the existence of Salan is questionable. However, the 10th century Lombard chronicler, Liudprand, also wrote about a Hungarian victory over the Bulgarians and the Byzantines in the early 10th century and other sources also mention that the area between Danube and Tisa was under Bulgarian rule, which confirm some claims from Gesta Hungarorum regarding the story about Salan.

== Appearances in popular media ==
Duke Salan appears as a playable character in the video game Crusader Kings III in the 9th-century start date.

== See also ==
- Bačka
- Bulgarian–Hungarian Wars

== Literature ==
- Marko Jovanov, Devet vekova od pomena imena Titela, Titelski letopis, Titel, 2001.
- Dr Aleksa Ivić, Istorija Srba u Vojvodini, Novi Sad, 1929.
- Prof.dr Radmilo Petrović, Vojvodina, Beograd, 2003.
