= Drahňov =

Village and municipality in Slovakia

Drahňov Deregnyő
- Municipality
- Flag

- Location of Drahňov in the Košice Region Location of Drahňov in Slovakia
- Coordinates: 48.58°N 21.97°E
- Country: Slovakia
- Region: Košice Region
- District: Michalovce District
- First mentioned: 1315

Area
  - Total: 17.55 km^{2} (6.78 sq mi)
- Elevation: 105 m (344 ft)

Population (2025)
  - Total: 1,720
- Time zone: UTC+1 (CET)
  - Summer (DST): UTC+2 (CEST)
- Postal code: 767 4
- Area code: +421 56
- Vehicle registration plate (until 2022): MI
- Website: www.drahnov.sk

Drahňov (Hungarian: Deregnyő) is a village and municipality in Michalovce District in the Kosice Region of eastern Slovakia.

== History ==
In historical records the village was first mentioned in 1315. Before the establishment of independent Czechoslovakia in 1918, it was part of Zemplén County within the Kingdom of Hungary.

== Geography ==
The municipality lies at an altitude of 105 metres (344 ft) and covers an area of 17.55 km^{2} (6.78 sq mi) (2025).

== Population ==
Population statistic (10 years)
Year	1995	2005	2015	2025
Count	989	1221	1457	1720
Difference		+23.45%	+19.32%	+18.05%

Population statistic
Year	2024	2025
Count	1692	1720
Difference		+1.65%

It has a population of 1720 people (31 December 2025).

=== Ethnicity ===
Census 2021 (1+ %)
Ethnicity	Number	Fraction
Hungarian	1073	67.99%
Romani	754	47.78%
Slovak	499	31.62%
Not found out	105	6.65%
Total	1578	

In year 2021 was 1578 people by ethnicity 1073 as Hungarian, 754 as Romani, 499 as Slovak, 105 as Not found out, 3 as Other, 2 as Czech, 1 as Ukrainian and 1 as Rusyn.

Note on population: The difference values of population numbers in the table "Population statistic" and in the sections "Ethnicity" & "Religion" is caused by the use of various statistical methods.

=== Religion ===
Census 2021 (1+ %)
Religion	Number	Fraction
Calvinist Church	652	41.32%
None	425	26.93%
Roman Catholic Church	200	12.67%
Greek Catholic Church	109	6.91%
Not found out	87	5.51%
Jehovah's Witnesses	79	5.01%
Evangelical Church	16	1.01%
Total	1578	

In year 2021 was 1578 people by religion 652 from Calvinist Church, 425 from None, 200 from Roman Catholic Church, 109 from Greek Catholic Church, 87 from Not found out, 79 from Jehovah's Witnesses, 16 from Evangelical Church, 4 from Other, 2 from Other and not ascertained christian church, 2 from Christian Congregations in Slovakia, 1 from Eastern Orthodox Church and 1 from Apostolic Church.

== Government ==
The village relies on the tax and district offices, fire brigade and police force at Veľké Kapušany.

== Culture ==
The village has a small public library, a post office, and a food store.

== Sports ==
The village has a football pitch.

== Transport ==
The village has a railway station.

== Genealogical resources ==
The records for genealogical research are available at the state archive "Statny Archiv in Kosice, Presov, Slovakia"

- Roman Catholic church records (births/marriages/deaths): 1727-1923 (parish B)
- Reformated church records (births/marriages/deaths): 1793-1938 (parish A)

== See also ==
- List of municipalities and towns in Slovakia
