= Cirocha =

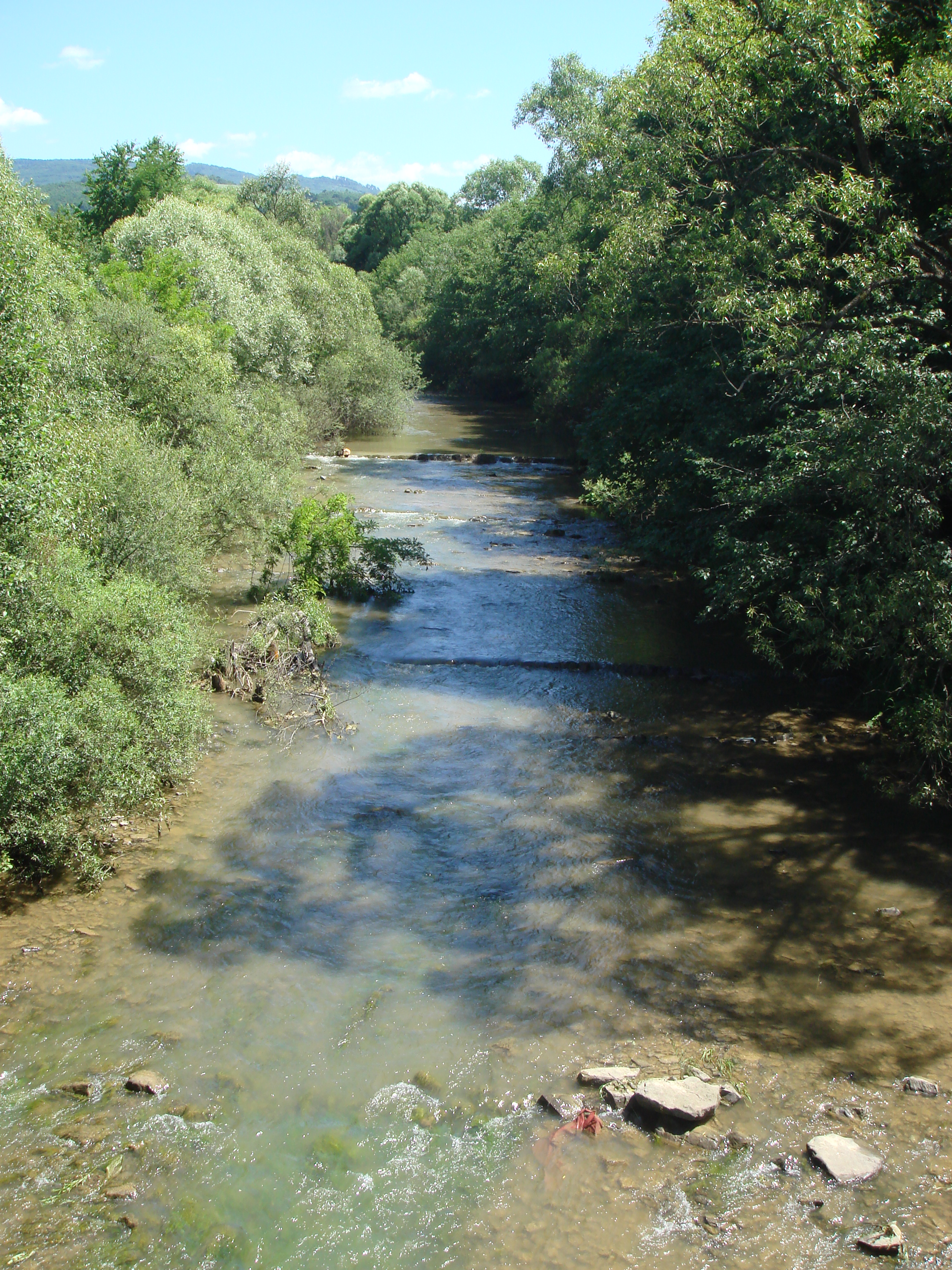
- Cirocha in Stakčín

Location
- Country: Slovakia

Physical characteristics
- Source: Bukovec Mountains
- Mouth
  - location: Laborec near Humenné
  - coordinates: 48.9334°N 21.9329°E
- Length: 50.1 km (31.1 mi)
- Basin size: 499.8 km^{2} (193.0 sq mi)
- Discharge
  - location: Snina
  - average: 2.85 m^{3}/s (101 cu ft/s)

Basin features
- Progression: Laborec→ Latorica→ Bodrog→ Tisza→ Danube→ Black Sea

Cirocha (Hungarian: Ciróka; Ukrainian: Ціроха) is a right tributary of the river Laborec in the Prešov Region of eastern Slovakia. It is 50.1 km (31.1 mi) long and its drainage basin size is 499.8 km^{2} (193.0 sq mi). Its average flow is 2.85 m^{3}/s (101 cu ft/s) in Snina.

== Course ==
The headwaters of the Cirocha are in the Bukovské vrchy mountains under the Ruské sedlo saddle at the Slovak-Polish border. It flows south and west after first few kilometres into the Starina reservoir, flowing further to the municipalities of Snina and Stakčín. From Stakčín it flows to the west, to its confluence with the Laborec river near Humenné.

== See also ==
- List of rivers of Slovakia
