= Laborec =

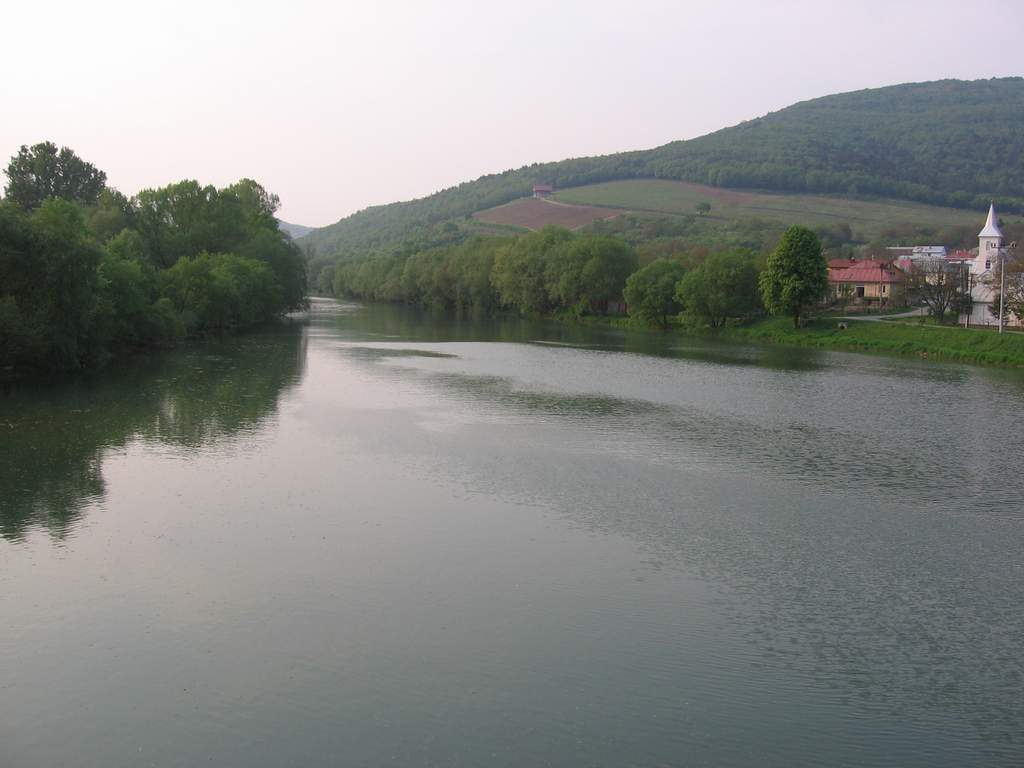
- Laborec at Strážske

Location
- Country: Ukraine, Slovakia

Physical characteristics
- Source
  - location: Laborec Highlands
- Mouth
  - location: Latorica
  - coordinates: 48.504°N 21.901°E
- Length: 126 km (78 mi)
- Basin size: 4,523 km^{2} (1,746 sq mi)

Basin features
- Progression: Latorica→ Bodrog→ Tisza→ Danube→ Black Sea
- Tributaries
  - left: Uzh, Cirocha

The Laborec (Rusyn: Лаборець; Hungarian: Laborc) is a river in eastern Slovakia that flows through the districts of Medzilaborce, Humenné, and Michalovce in the Košice Region, and the Prešov Region. The river drains the Laborec Highlands. It is 126 km (78 mi) long and its basin size is 4,523 km^{2} (1,746 sq mi).

== Tributaries ==
Tributaries of the Laborec river include the Uzh which joins the Laborec near the rural municipality of Drahňov in Michalovce District, and the Cirocha river. The Laborec itself is a tributary, flowing into the Latorica river.

== Gallery ==
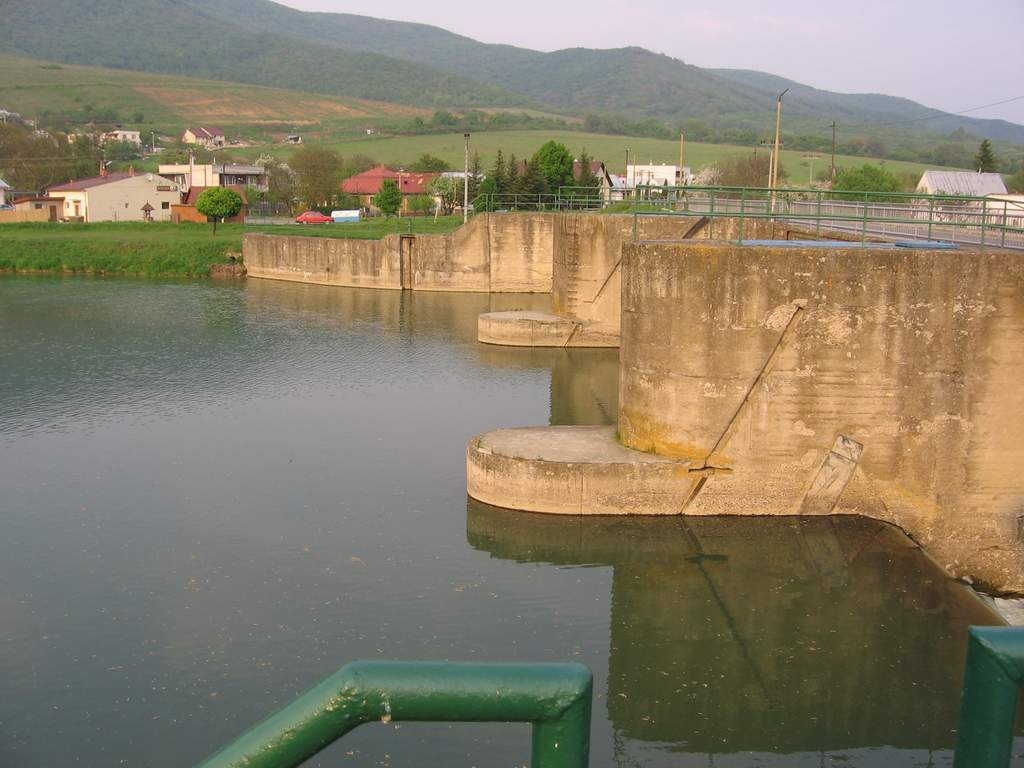
Bridge over the Laborec at Strážske

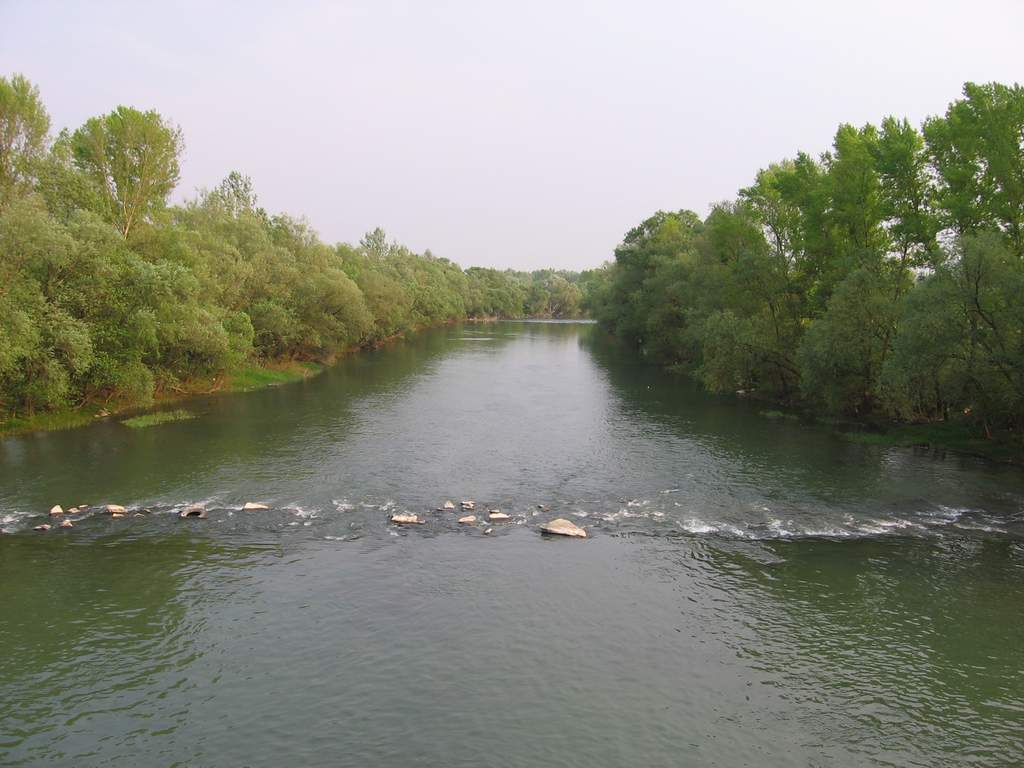
The river Laborec at Strážske

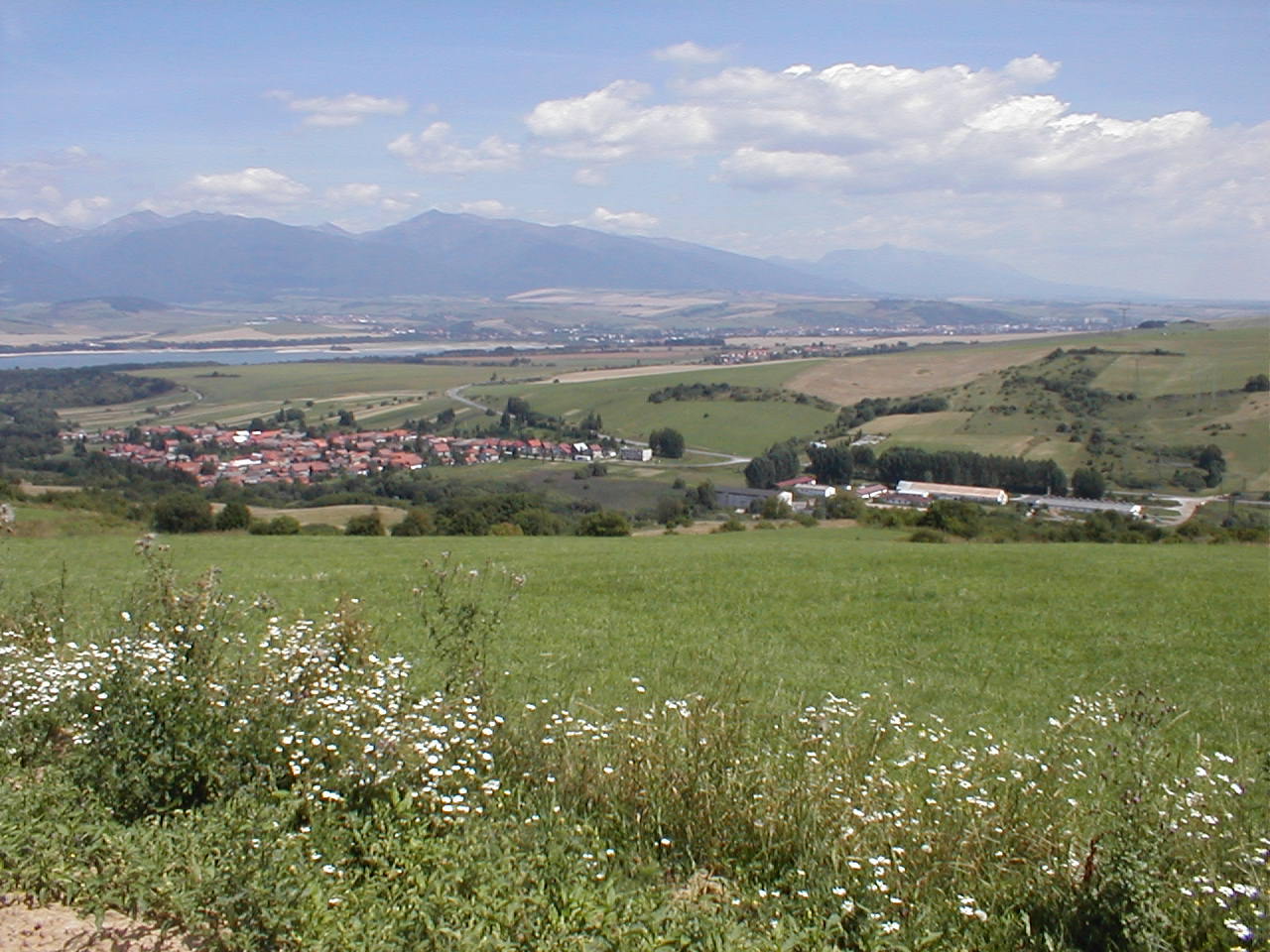
The river near Michalovce, where the legendary Prince Laborec is said to have died.
