= Laborec (ruler) =

According to the Gesta Hungarorum by Bele Regis Notarius, Laborec was a Slavic ruler in the 9th century who was a vassal of Great Moravia. According to the Gesta Hungarorum, at the time of the Hungarian conquest of the Carpathian Basin around 896 Laborec opposed the conquest of Carpathian Ruthenia by Hungarian tribes led by Árpád. His existence is controversial as the only source that mentions him, Gesta Hungarorum, was written in the 13th century, more than 300 years after his presumed rule.

== Laborec in the account of the Gesta Hungarorum ==
During the 9th century, a fortified castle changed into a fortified early feudal town-settlement (now Uzhhorod), which became the centre of a new Slavonic principality ruled by Laborec. When Tsar Simeon the Great began expanding his Bulgarian Empire, he gained control of a segment of territory, forcing Laborec to recognize his authority at the end of the 9th century. In 896 the Hungarian tribes crossed the Carpathian Range and migrated into Pannonian Basin. Prince Laborec fell from power under the efforts of the Hungarians and the Kievan forces. Laborec was defeated and killed on the banks of the Laborec river that still carries his name.

== Debate about the existence and identity of Laborec ==
According to a number of modern historians Laborec was not a real person, and some consider him a ruler of White Croats.

== See also ==
- Laborec
- Laborec Highlands
