= Ingala Valley =

Archaeological site in Isetsky District, Russia

- Ингальская долина (Russian)
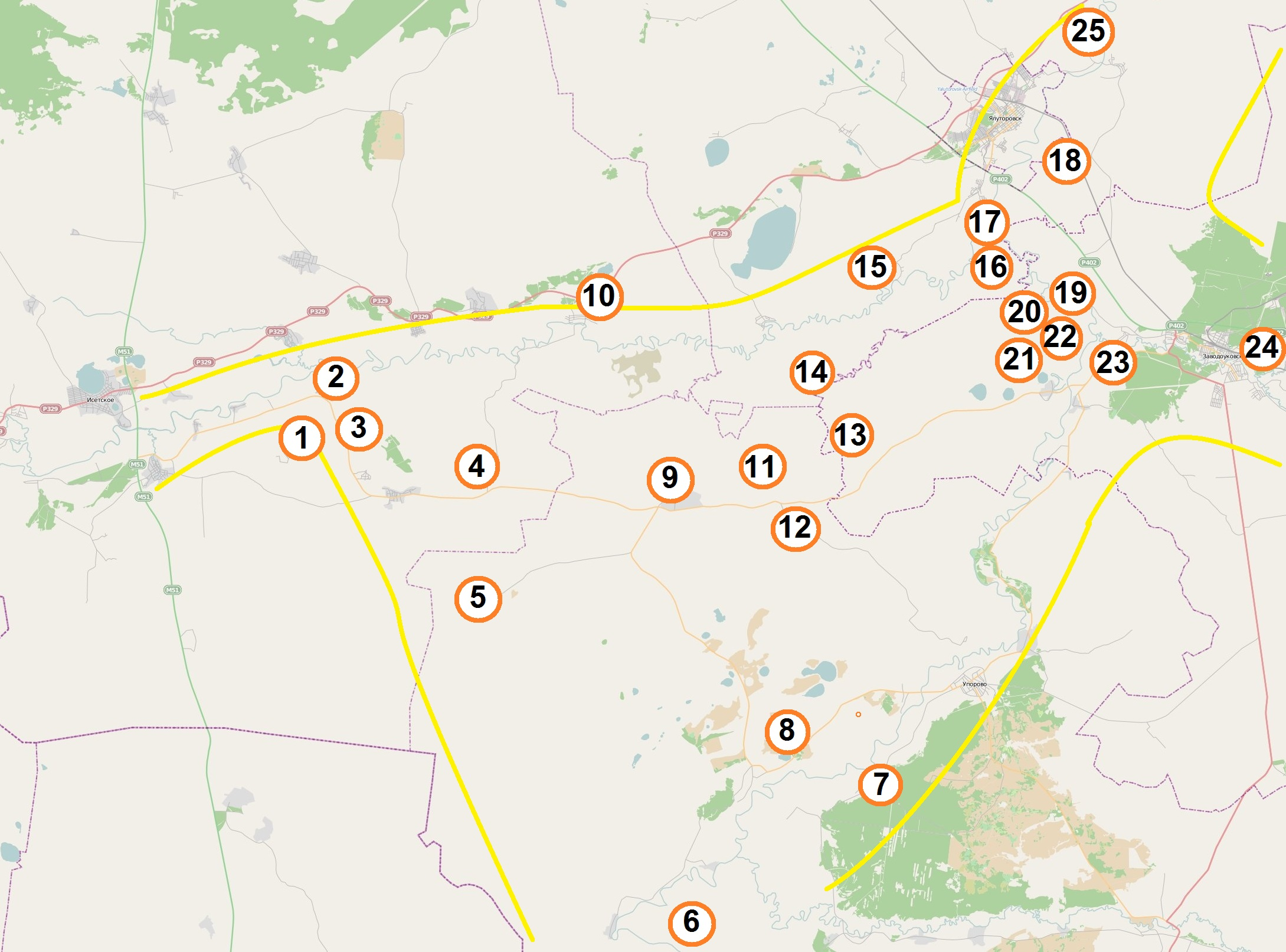
- The numbers mean: 1 - Mary's ravine, 2 - Krasnogorsky arheotop (Khripunova grave field, Lizunovo hill fort), 3 - Kolovskiy, 4 - Upper Ingalsky Borok, 5 - Lipihinskoe, 6 - Borovushki, 7 - Skorodum, 8 - Tyutrinsky grave field, 9 - Ingalinskoe, 10 - Sloboda-Beshkilskoe hill fort, 11 - Lower Ingalinskoe, 12 - Pushkarevo, 13 - Ak-Pash, 14 - Sazyk, 15 - Sosnovka, 16 - Ostrov, 17 - Buzan, 18 - Imbiryay, 19 - Ustyug, 20 - Schetkovo, 21 - Old-Lybaevo, 22 - Dvuhozernoe, 23 - Gilyova, 24 - Uk, 25 - Khokhlovskiy kurgan.

- Location within Continental Asia Location within Tyumen Oblast
- 56°24′23″N 65°56′14″E
- Type: Archaeological district
- Periods: Mesolithic–Middle Ages
- Cultures: Koshkino (6th–5th millennium BC); Sosnovka-Ostrov (5th–4th millennium BC); Boborykino (5th–4th millennium BC); Lybaevo (4th–3rd millennium BC); Andreevskoe (3rd millennium BC); Tashkovo (22nd–18th century BC); Alakul (18th–16th century BC); Fedorovo (16th–14th century BC); Tcherkascul and Pakhomovo (13th–11th century BC); Barkhatovo (11th–8th century BC); Itkul, Baitovo and Gorokhovo (8th–3rd century BC); Sargat (5th century BC–5th century AD); Bakal and Yudino (9th–15th century)
- Location: Isetsky, Yalutorovsky, Zavodoukovsky and Uporovsky Districts (Tyumen Oblast, Russia)
- Region: Western Siberia
- Part of: Iset cultural and historical province

Site notes
- Length: 55 km (34 mi)
- Width: 30 km (19 mi)
- Area: 1,500 km^{2} (580 sq mi)
- Excavation dates: 1995–2003
- Archaeologists: Daniel Gottlieb Messerschmidt; Gerhard Friedrich Müller; Peter Simon Pallas; Nikolay Abramov; Ivan Slovtsov; Axel Olai Heikel; Pavel Kozhin; Vladislav Mogilnikov; Alexander Matveev; Natalya Matveeva; Eugene Volkov
- Owner: Public
- Public access: Yes

The Ingala Valley (Russian: Ингальская долина) is an archaeological district in the area between the Tobol and Iset rivers. It is the largest one in the south of the Tyumen Oblast, and belongs to the Iset cultural and historical province. It has 177 kurgans, 55 archaeological sites of federal significance and 5 regional natural monuments.

Archaeological sites in the valley date from the Mesolithic (8th–7th millennium BC) to the Middle Ages (15th century) and include marks of the Andronovo culture and Sargat culture civilizations. Some of the artifacts are stored in the State Hermitage Museum as the Siberian collection of Peter the Great; others belonged to the lost well-known private collection of Nicolaes Witsen.

== Description ==
The Ingala Valley is located 75 km south of Tyumen, at the mouth of the Iset River. At this point, the borders of the Isetsky, Yalutorovsky, Zavodoukovsky and Uporovsky Districts of the Tyumen Oblast are closed. The valley was named in 1994 by the most common local toponyms translated from the Siberian Tatar language as scirpus.

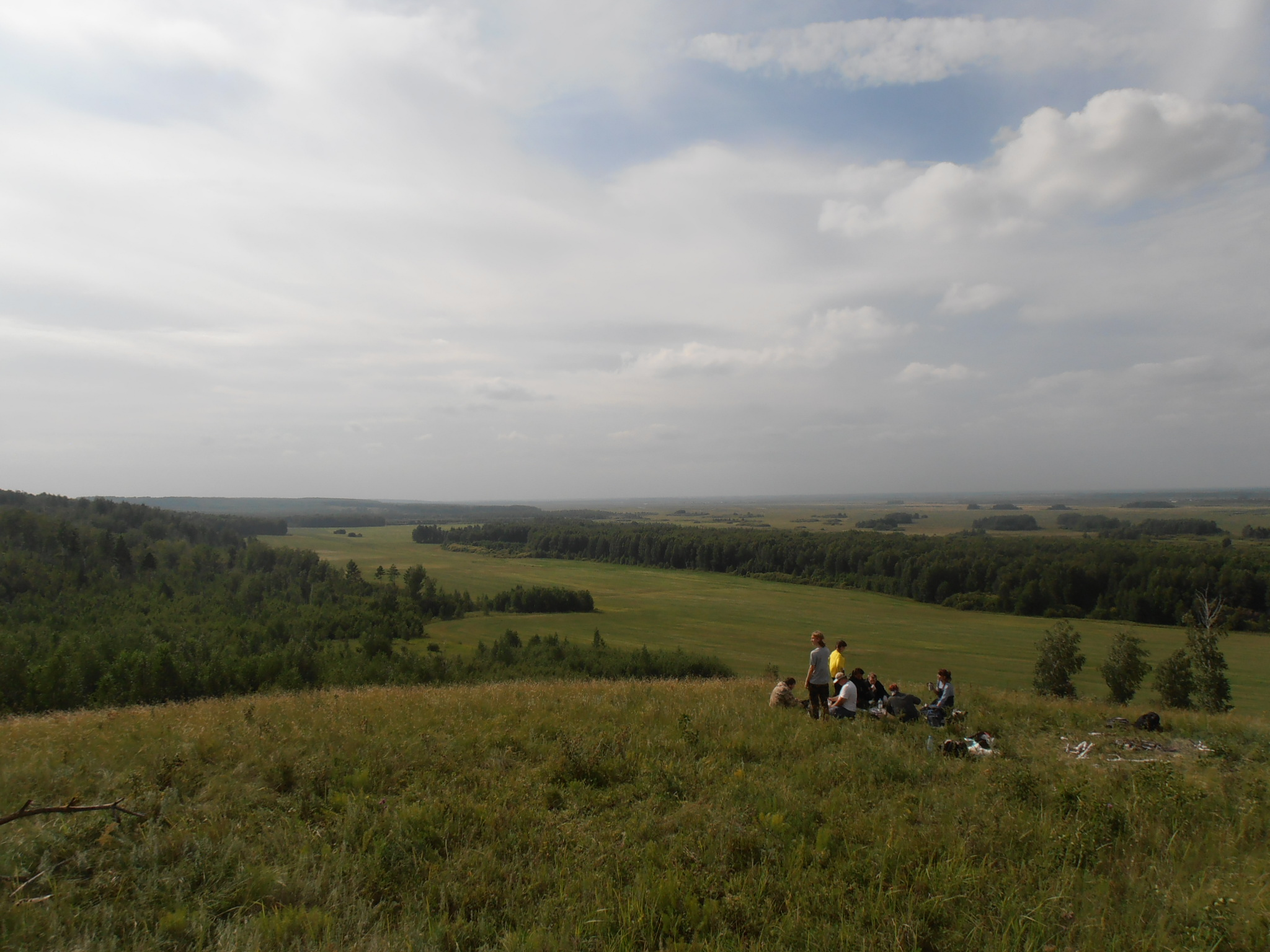
A view from a high terrace of the Iset River

The valley covers an area of about 1500 square kilometres. It was formed as a result of a merger of the river valleys of the Tobol and Iset rivers. It has the shape of a trapezoid on a map, with a vertex extending to the northeast. The north–south length is about 55 km; on the east–west axis it is from 20 to 45 km. In terms of relief it looks like a cavity, which is bounded on the north by a high terrace of the Iset River, and on the east by a terrace of the Tobol River. In the central part of the valley flow the Hog Ingala and Large Ingala rivers, which are tributaries of the Iset River.

There are two routes leading into the valley. The southern route is from Tyumen by the highway M51 towards Kurgan. Beyond the village Isetskoe it crosses the Iset River and turns in front of the village Soloboevo, then through Malyshy, Botniki, and Krasnogorskoe—the beginning of the valley. From here, travelers may access the route Krasnogorskoe-Loga—Minino—Onufrieva—Upper Ingal—Niphaki—Ingalinskoe—Lykovo—Koklyagina—Surka—Tyutrina—Byzovo—Uporovo from the south west to travel around the valley. From Uporovo, Zavodoukovsk can be reached by crossing the Tobol River heading north through Lesnoy—Central—Michurinskiy. The route returns to Tyumen via the highway P402.

The northern route begins from highway P402, between Tyumen and Zavodoukovsk. From highway P402 the river Uk may be crossed to reach Sungurovo, and from there the Tobol River crossed to reach Novolybaevo and the Ingala Valley. Continuing the route through Karasye and Shilikul, the northern route is connected with the southern route, additionally back roads can be traveled through Pushkareva to Ingalinskoe (to the west) or to Koklyagina (to the south).

== History of the study ==
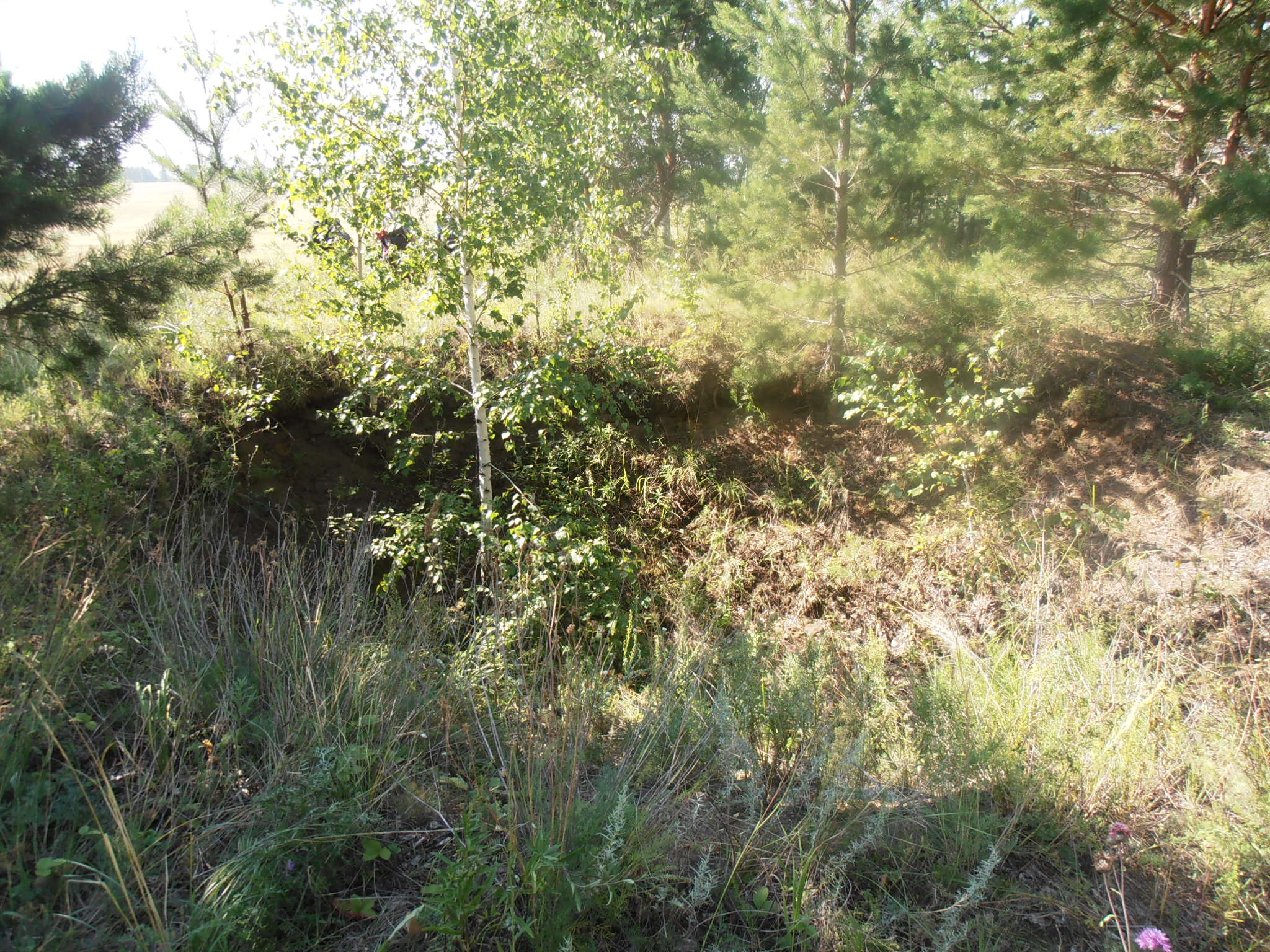
The Khripunova grave field. A hole remaining after grave robbery.

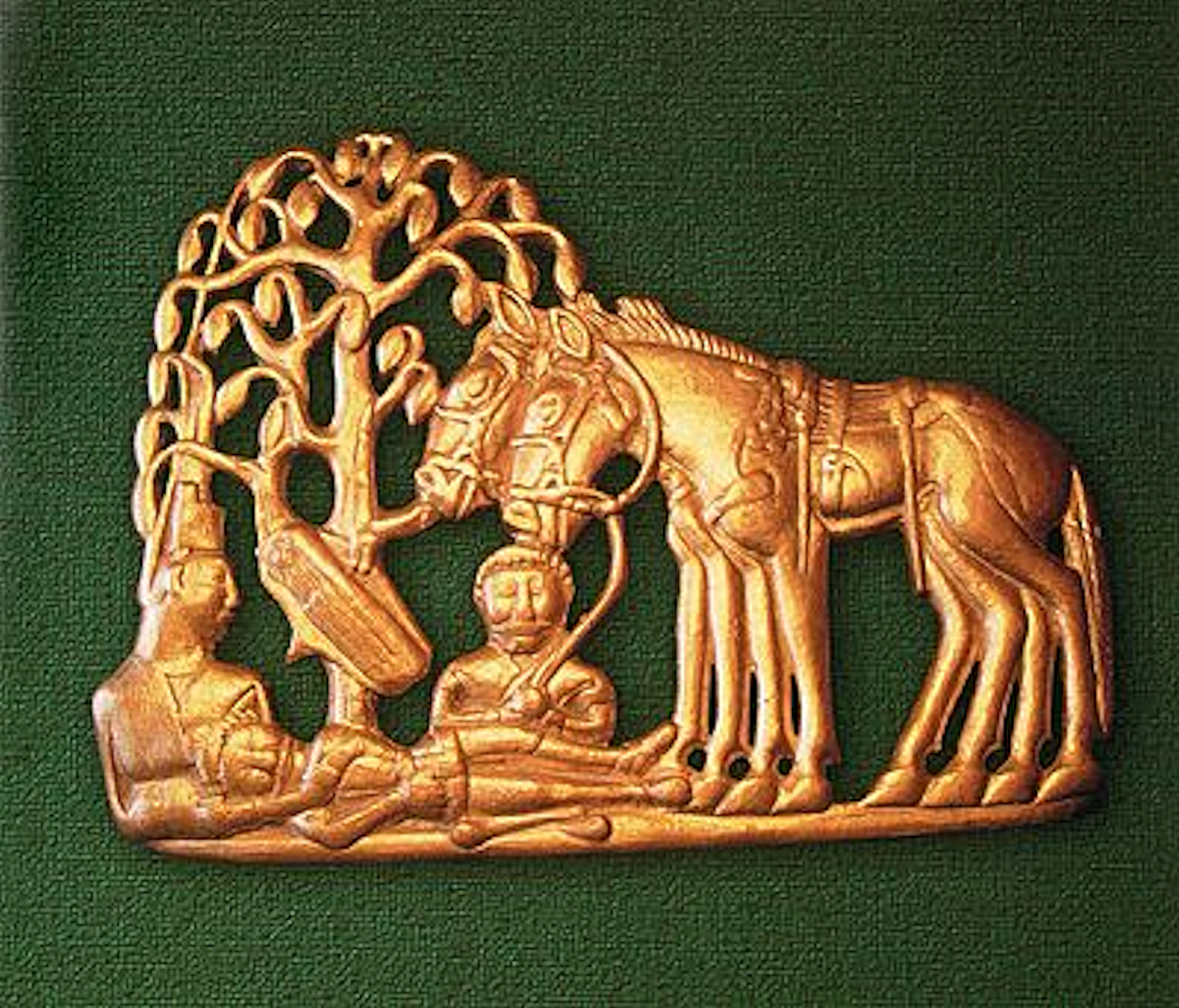
Belt plaque from the Siberian collection of Peter the Great: it was sent by M. P. Gagarin, governor of Siberia in Tobolsk, in 1716. Dated circa 300 BCE.

The first explorers of the valley were so-called bugrovschiki, robbers of ancient graves. In 1669, the governor of the Tobolsk rank Petr Ivanovich Godunov told tsar Alexei Mikhailovich that gold, silver items and utensils were extracted from "Tatar graves" near the Iset River. As a result of bugrovschiki most treasures of the Siberian kurgans are lost forever.

In 1712, a commander of Shadrinsk, prince Vasily Meshchersky, began excavations of kurgans to get gold, silver and copper items to replenish the state treasury by order of the Siberian governor prince Matvey Petrovich Gagarin. During the years 1715-1717 governor Gagarin sent Siberian treasures to Peter the Great four times. 250 ancient gold jewelry pieces sent by Gagarin became known as the Siberian collection of Peter the Great, which is now available in the State Hermitage at the gallery of jewels called "The Scythian Gold".

Some of the treasures extracted by bugrovschiki appeared in private collections abroad. The most famous was the collection of Amsterdam mayor Nicolaes Witsen; a part of it is known only from tables drawn in the third edition of his book Noord en Oost Tartatye (1785), and the collection was lost after 1717.

The first among scientists to get acquainted with findings of the Ingala Valley was Daniel Messerschmidt, whose expedition into the Siberia Governorate took place in 1719-1727. Gerhard Müller, who visited Siberia in 1733-1743 together with the Great Northern Expedition, stated that bugrovschiki activity was finished because the kurgans had been totally robbed. Peter Pallas during the Academic Expedition (1768-1774) described the kurgans Tyutrinskiy, Savinovskiy and Peschaniy-I. In 1861, Nikolay Abramov (scientist) published information about kurgans and hill forts of the Yalutorovsky, Tyumensky and Kurgansky Okrugs. In 1890, Ivan Slovtsov published a list of burial mounds and hill forts of Tobolsk Governorate, including information about the burial mounds Krasnogorskiy-I and Krasnogorskiy Borok, also the hill forts Zmeevo and Lizunovo (Krasnogorskoe). In 1893, Axel Heikel became the first to discover traces of the Andronovo culture near Yalutorovsk.

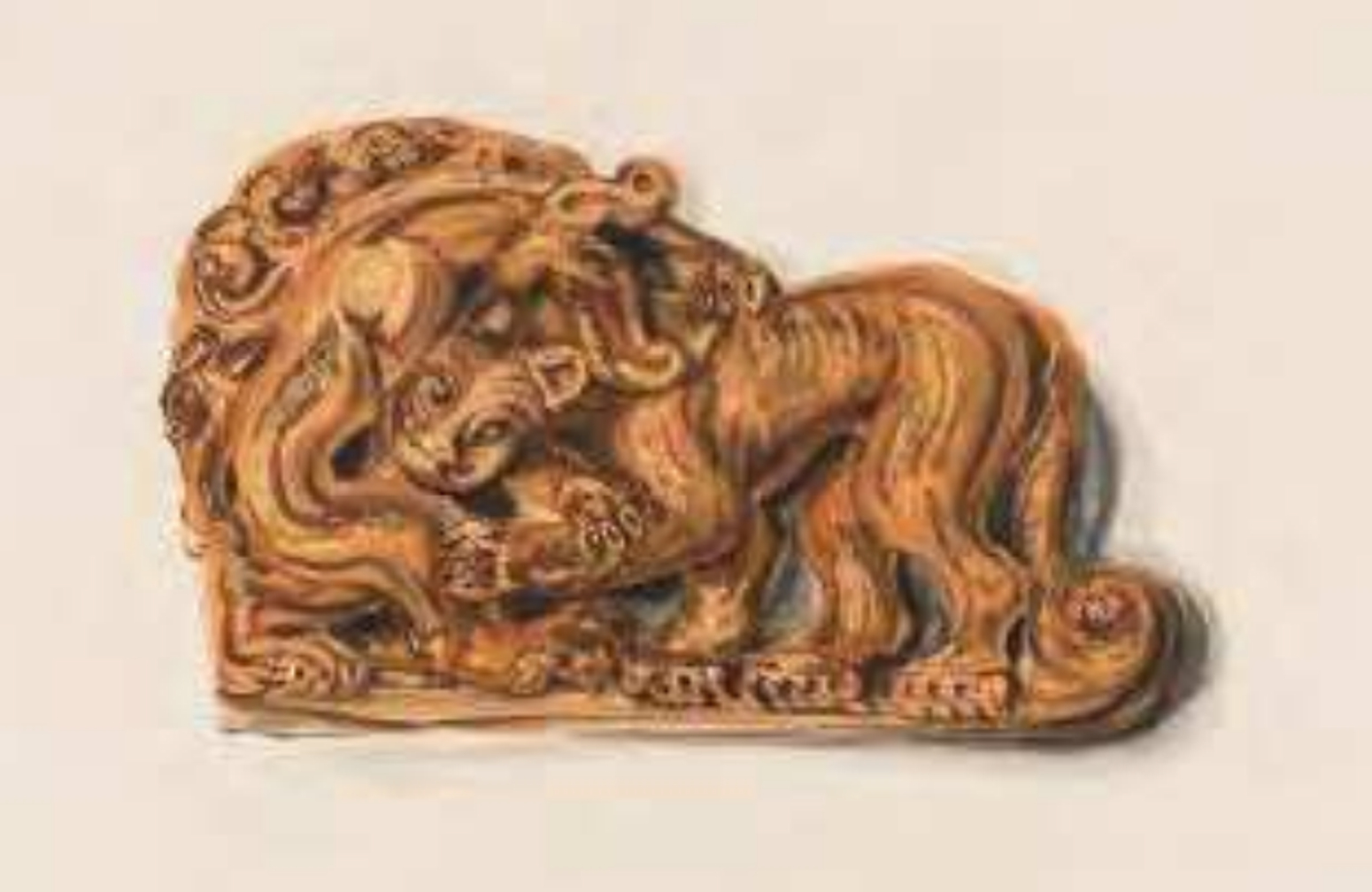
Watercolour drawing of a contest between tiger and monster from the 1730s, Siberian Collection of Peter the Great. Object sent by M. P. Gagarin, governor of Siberia in Tobolsk, in 1716. Dated circa 300 BCE. State Hermitage Museum, Si 1727 1-11.

Studies of the valley resumed in 1959 due to P. M. Kozhin. An expedition of Ural State University (V. Frolov, T. Gasheva, V. T. Yurovskaya (Kovaleva), T. G. Bushueva, B. B. Ovchinnikova) has continued since 1962. In 1970–1980, exploration was carried out by V. A. Mogilnikov from the Institute of Archaeology of the Russian Academy of Sciences, and also by N. P. Matveeva, Alexander Matveev (historian) and I. V. Usacheva (Zilina) from the Tyumen State University, and by A. S. Sergeev from the Institute of History and Archaeology of the Ural Branch of the Russian Academy of Sciences.

In 1994, A. V. Matveev identified natural boundaries of the valley that first allowed perceiving it as a united archaeological complex. The following year, research by the West Siberian archaeological expedition of the Institute of Northern Development of the Siberian Branch of the Russian Academy of Sciences was begun. By Decree of the President of Russia Boris Yeltsin on February 20, 1995 No. 176, many archaeological sites of the Ingala Valley received the status of cultural heritage site in Russia of federal importance. From 1995 to 2003, 300 new archaeological sites were identified.

== Periodization of cultural layers ==
Currently, these are 549 archaeological sites discovered in the Ingala Valley; the oldest one dates to the Middle Stone Age.

=== Stone Age ===
==== Mesolithic ====
The Mesolithic is presented in the Ingala Valley with early cultural deposits of the archaeological monument "Ostrov-II". Absence of radiocarbon dating does not allow setting an age of the finds. By analogy with other Mesolithic parkings in the south of the Tyumen Oblast ("Katenka" and "Zvezdniy"), a chronological framework of the oldest finds in the valley was limited within 8th–7th millennium BC.

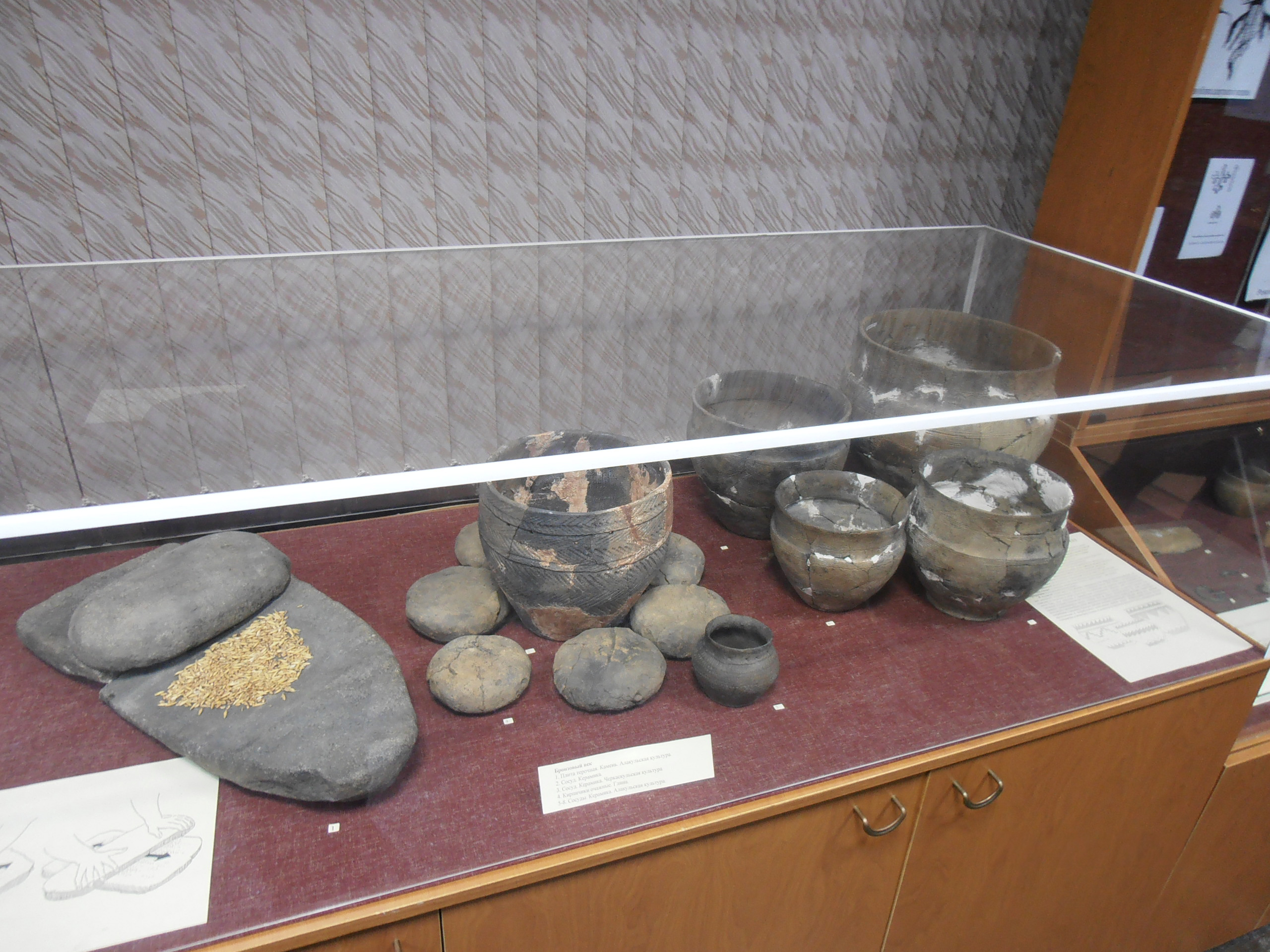
Artifacts of the Bronze Age. Museum of archaeology and ethnography of the TyumSU, 2013

==== Neolithic ====
The Neolithic presents with 37 sites found during excavations of the settlement "Dvuhozernoe-I", the ritual complex "Ostrov-II", and the grave field "Old-Lybaevo-IV". Six of these belong to the Koshkino archaeological culture, twelve to the Sosnovka-Ostrov culture, eleven to the Boborykino, three to the Poludenskoe and five do not have a reliable cultural attribution.

According to Eugene Volkov, the earliest Neolithic culture of the Ingala Valley should be considered the Koshkino (middle 6th millennium BC – late 5th millennium BC), and the Sosnovka-Ostrov (middle 5th millennium BC – 4th millennium BC) was the next. Boborykino culture (late 5th millennium BC – late 4th millennium BC) coexisted with the Koshkinskino and Sosnovka-Ostrov. Monuments of the Poludenskoe culture are few; perhaps they were functioning at a time when the surrounding area was empty.

=== Copper Age ===
The Chalcolithic is presented with 54 monuments, of which 28 belong to the Lybaevo culture, 12 to the Andreevskoe and 14 did not get a reliable attribution.

Early Chalcolithic (the Buzan period of the Lybaevo culture) is identified with artifacts of the grave field "Buzan-III" (3190 BC ± 60 years), and the settlements "Sazyk-IX" (3150 BC ± 60 years) and "Lipihinskoe-V". The most prominent artifact of the grave field "Buzan-III" is the remains of a wooden funerary ladya longer than 5 m found in 1996, the oldest in Northern Eurasia. Its age is comparable to Stonehenge 1, the Protodynastic Period of Ancient Egypt, Egyptian hieroglyphics, the first cities in Mesopotamia and the late period of the Cucuteni-Trypillian culture. A replica of the ladya is situated now in the Archaeological gallery of the Yalutorovsky Ostrog.

During the first third of the 3rd millennium BC members of the Andreevskoe culture penetrated into the valley from the Tura cultural and historical province, and until the end of the 3rd millennium BC the Lybaevo and Andreevskoe cultures evolved synchronously. Eugene Volkov calls this phase the Dvuhozerny period of the Lybaevo culture (represented by artifacts of the settlements "Dvuhozernoe-I", "Lower Ingalinskoe-IIIa", "Ostrov-IIa" and "Upper Ingalsky Borok-II").

=== Bronze Age ===
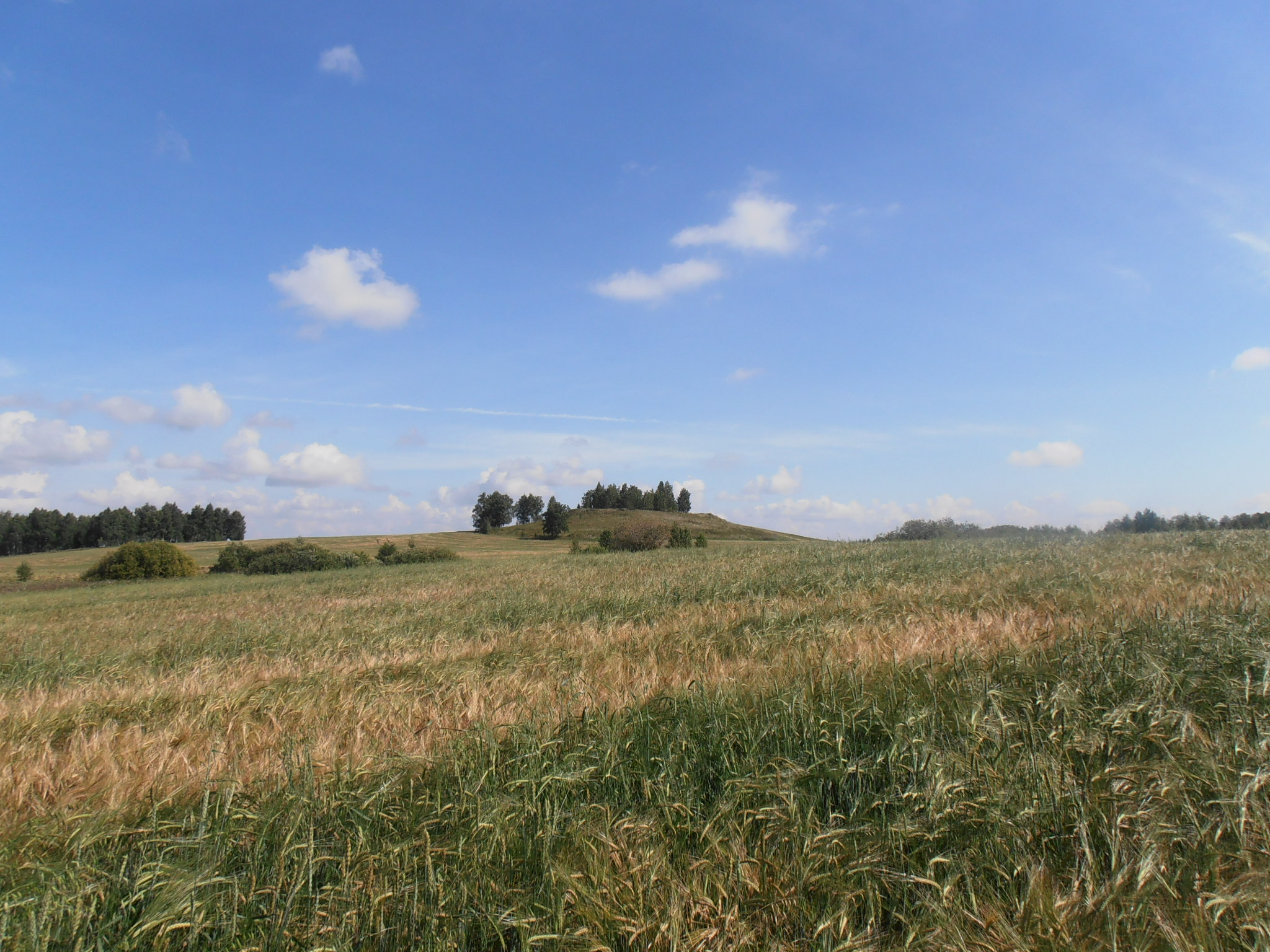
The Khripunova grave field (Isetsky District). Alakul culture. 2014

The Bronze Age in the valley is divided into three stages. Early Bronze Age (late 22nd/early 21st century BC – middle 18th century BC) is represented with seven settlements of the Tashkovo culture (a sequel of the Andreevskoe one) and two monuments of the Imbiryay culture.

The stage of the Andronovo antiquities is presented with 13 monuments (four both from the Alakul and Fedorovo cultures and five from the Cherkaskul). Opened by Axel Heikel near Yalutorovsk in 1893, traces of the Alakuls were at first considered evidence of random attacks of Alakul squads to the north. But finds in the settlement "Uk-III" near Zavodoukovsk and in the Khripunova grave field near village Krasnogorskoe discovered at the end of the 20th century forced more serious consideration of the presence of Andronovo culture in the Ingala Valley. According to Alexander Matveev, the Alakul culture consists of the following stages: Chistolebyazhsky, Alakul (developed), Kamyshinsky (late) and Amangeldinsky (transition to the Fedorovo culture). Of these there were found in the Ingala Valley monuments of the middle (the Khripunova grave field is the most northern of the Alakul cemeteries, the settlement "Lower Ingalinskoe-III") and late (the second group of burials of the Khripunova grave field, the settlement "Uk-III") stages of dating the second quarter of the 18th – middle 16th century BC. The Fedorovo antiquities are dated from the middle 16th to late 14th century BC; the Cherkaskul ones are dated to the 13th–11th centuries BC.

The late Bronze Age in the valley is presented with 24 monuments, of which 12 belong to Pakhomovo culture (though it existed in sync with the Cherkaskul one), seven belong to Barkhatovo culture, and five are not identified. A chronological boundary of Barkhatovo antiquities (settlements "Schetkovo-II" and Kolovskiy) is from the last quarter of the 11th to the end of the 8th century BC. During the late Bronze Age construction of hill forts began in the Ingala Valley, the earliest of which is the Ak-Pash-I. The tallest of hill forts is the Lizunovo (Krasnogorskoe) in the Iset District; it is located on a promontory with a steep slope nearly 45 meters high. Its discovery began an opening of the Barkhatovo culture.

=== Iron Age ===
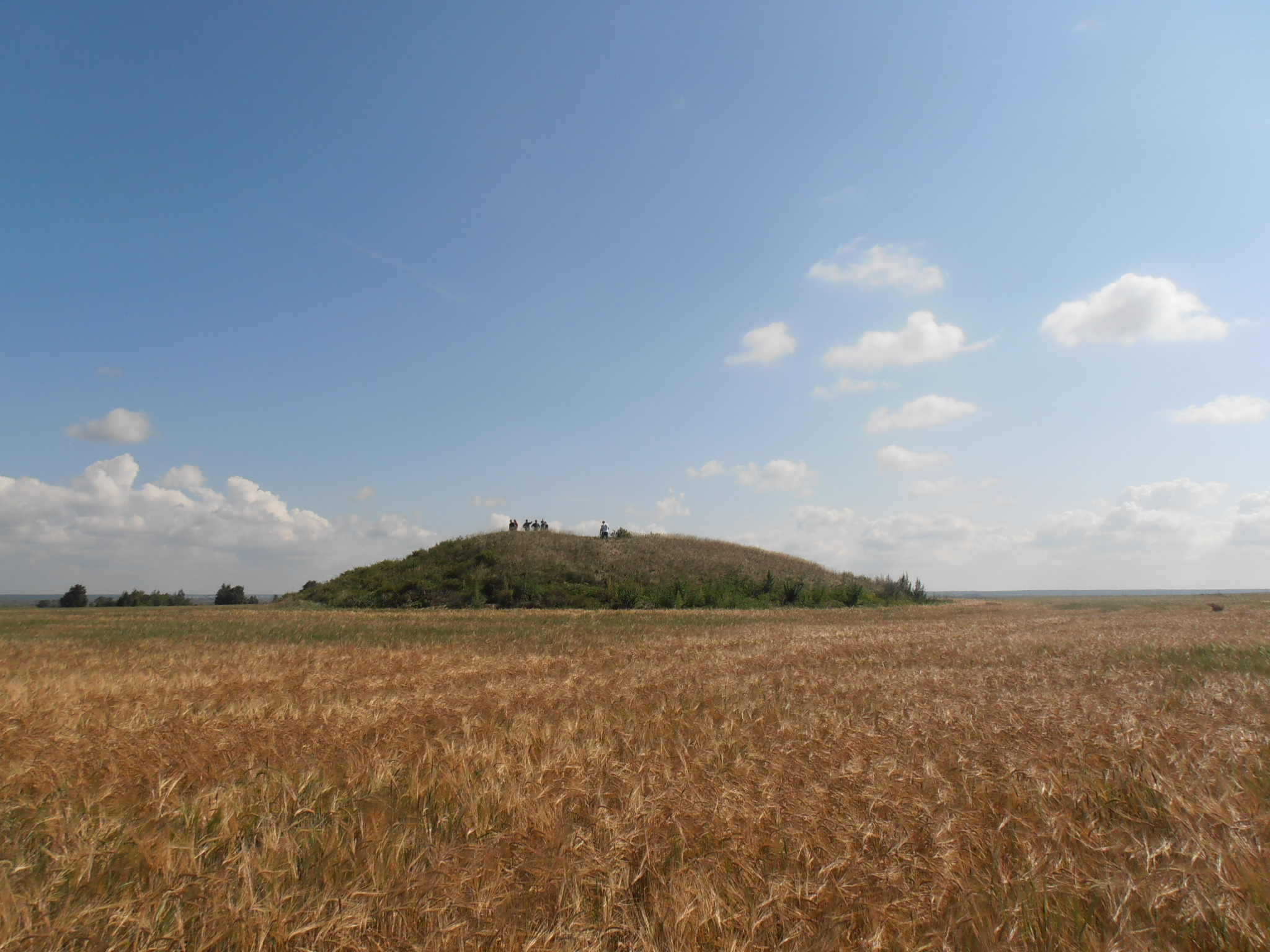
Kurgan Krasnogorsky-2 (Isetsky District). Sargat culture, 2014

Transition time from the Bronze Age to the Iron one is presented in the Ingala Valley with four monuments of the Itkul culture (late 8th-5th century BC) and three monuments without sustainable cultural attribution.

There are 139 sites from the early Iron Age; among them 30 belong to the Baitovo culture, 16 belong to the Gorokhovo, 55 to the Sargat culture, one to the Kashino, and 37 do not have a strong cultural attribution. Baitovo tribes (7th-5th century BC) were successors of the Barkhatovo culture and coexisted with Itkul and Gorokhovo tribes, being destroyed by Sargats. The Gorokhovo people (originating in the 7th century BC) were not immediately dissolved by the Sargats and coexisted with them until the 3rd century BC. If the early stage of the Sargat culture (5th – early 3rd century BC) co-existed with its neighbors, then from the 2nd century BC to the 5th century AD Sargats have no rivals throughout the Middle After-Ural.

Kurgans in the valley are associated with Sargats (and partly with Baitovo tribes) first of all. The number of kurgans reaches 177, a diameter of individual ones more than 60 m. Many kurgans contain highly artistic artifacts made of gold, silver, gemstones and numerous decorations made in workshops of Ancient Egypt, slave-owning states of the Northern Black Sea Coast and Central Asia. So, during excavations of the Tyutrinsky grave field near the village Suerka in 1981, Natalya and Alexander Matveevs found beads from blue spinel, which is produced only in Hindustan, Sri Lanka and Borneo, and also a miniature (less than 2 cm in length) faience amulet of Harpocrates (Hellenistic tradition of an image of the Ancient Egyptian god Horus). According to Alexander Matveev, the wealth of the Sargats' kurgans may indicate the Ingala Valley was a burial place of representatives of one or more Sargat "royal" families at the beginning of the Common Era, which had a source of enrichment from control of the supply of strategic goods along the Silk Road.

A Sargat village discovered in the tract Copper Borok covers an area of 15.5 ha, which makes it considered a town.

=== Middle Ages ===
The Middle Ages is represented in the valley with 21 monuments, seven of them belonging to the Bakal culture (9th–15th century), and four belonging to Yudino (10th–13th century). Ten monuments do not have cultural attribution. It is believed that Bakal and Yudino cultures coexisted, but there is a need to justify the earlier date of the Bakal culture to fill the gap in the 300 years after disappearance of the Sargats in the 5th century.

Archaeologists at work

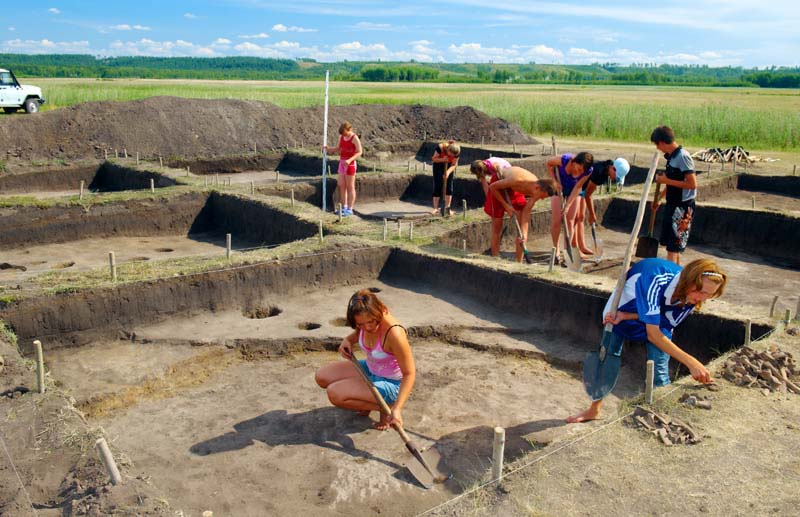

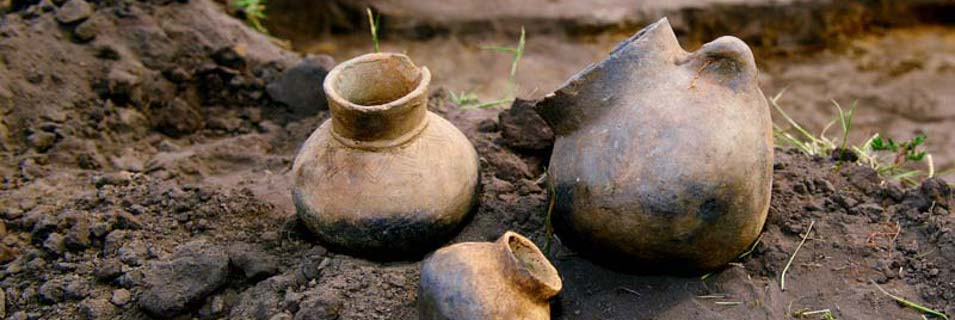

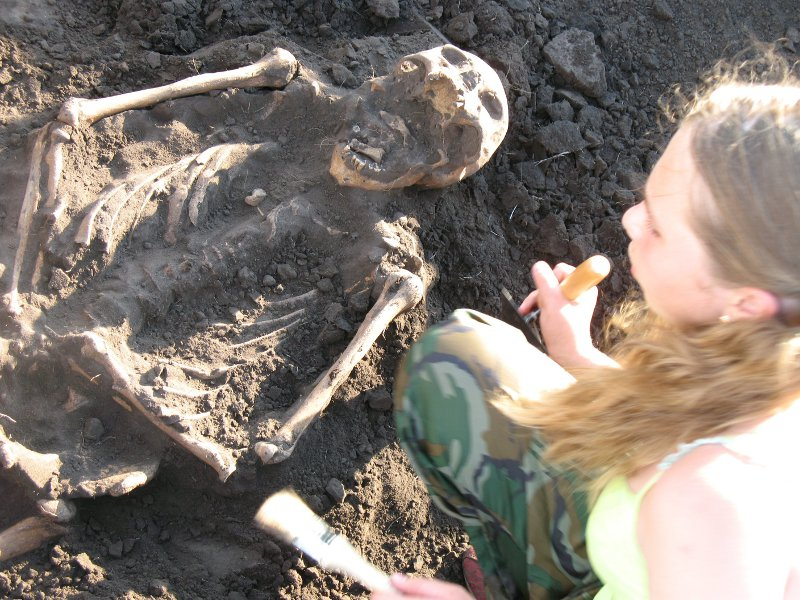

== Tourist use ==
Tourists may be interested in visiting protected areas and objects of cultural heritage located in the valley. Thus, Buzan, Zinovskiy and Khokhlovskiy kurgans in the Yalutorovsky District and Mary's ravine located in the Isetsky District are the natural monuments of regional significance. A list of the objects of cultural heritage of federal importance in the Ingala Valley include:

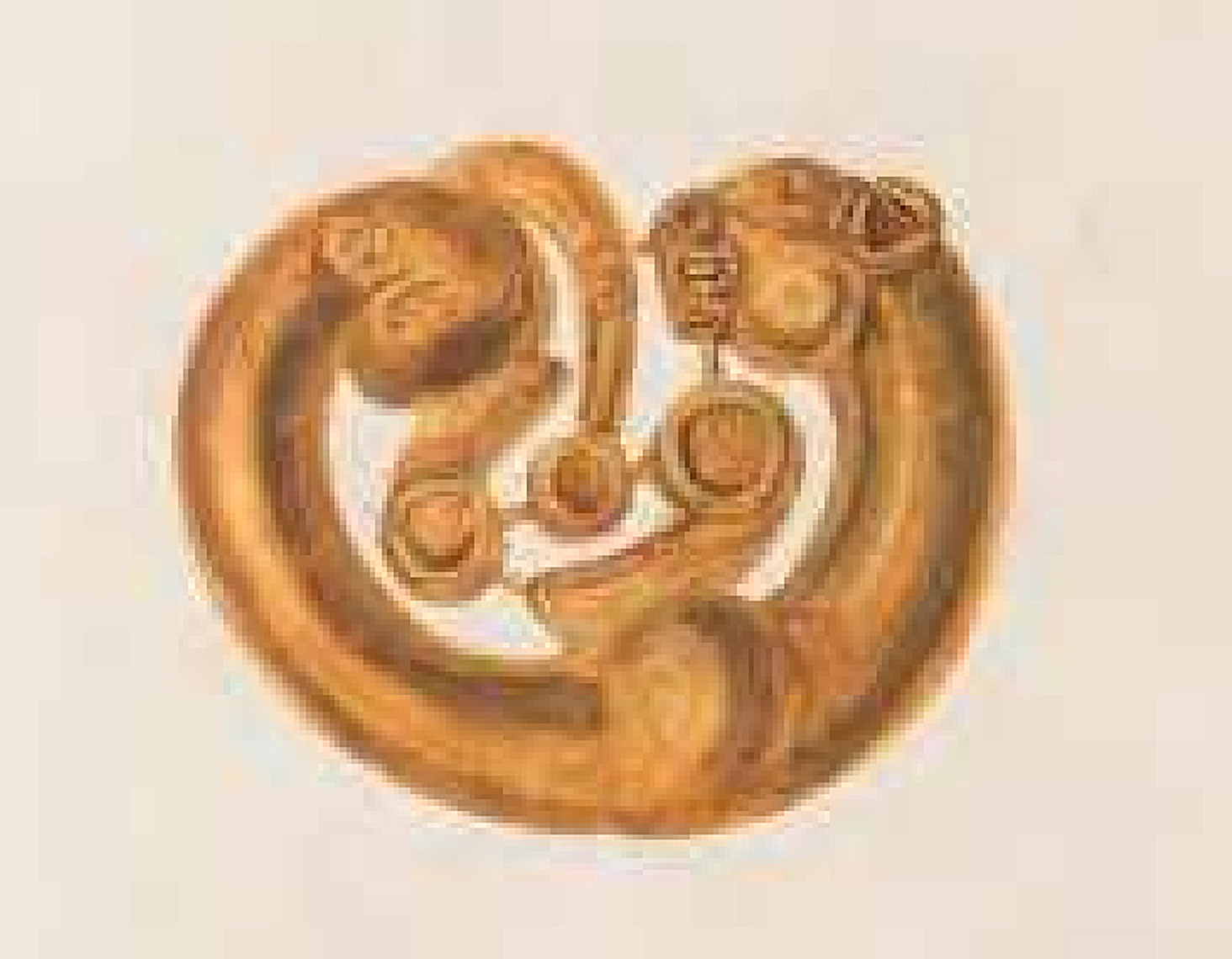
Watercolour drawing of a coiled panther from the 1730s, Siberian Collection of Peter the Great. Object sent by M. P. Gagarin, governor of Siberia in Tobolsk, in 1716. Dated to the 7th century BCE. State Hermitage Museum, Si 1727 1-88

- in the Zavodoukovsky District
  - settlement "Gilyova-VIII",
  - fortified settlement "Gilyova-VI",
  - complex of monuments - the hill forts "Old-Lybaevo-I", "Old-Lybaevo-II" and "Ustyug-II", the kurgan groups "Ostrov", "Old-Lybaevo-IV", "Old-Lybaevo-V", "Old-Lybaevo-VI" and "Ustyug-I", the settlements "Old-Lybaevo-VII", "Old-Lybaevo-IX", "Ustyug-III", "Uk-VIII", "Uk-IX", "Uk-X", "Uk-XI", "Uk-XII", "Uk-XIII", "Uk-XIV", "Uk-XV" and "Old-Lybaevo-III";
- in the Isetsky District - archaeological sites the settlement "Kolovskaya" and Slobodo-Beshkilskoe, the grave field "Krasnogorsky-I", the settlements "Kolovskaya-I" and "Kolovskaya-II";
- in the Uporovsky District
  - complex of monuments - the kurgan group "Bugorki-I", the settlement "Borovushka-I", the parking "Borovushka-III",
  - the settlement "Ingalinka-I",
  - the grave field "Pushkarevsky-I", and
  - the settlement "Skorodum:.

There are the archaeological school camp "Issedon" in the Isetsky District and "Lukomorye" in Zavodoukovsk. The Zavodoukovsk History Museum offers an exhibition "Secrets of the Ingala Valley" and summer car tour "An archaeological heritage of the Ingala Valley" along a path Zavodoukovsk - Lybaevo - archaeological sites - Lower Ingal (with customer's transport).

It was announced that in 2013 the "Ingala" sanatorium complex in the Zavodoukovsky District would be put into operation (land area of 13 ha, number of rooms 350 seats), being built to replace the "Niva" resort (not opened yet as of 2014).

The regional natural monument "Mary's ravine"

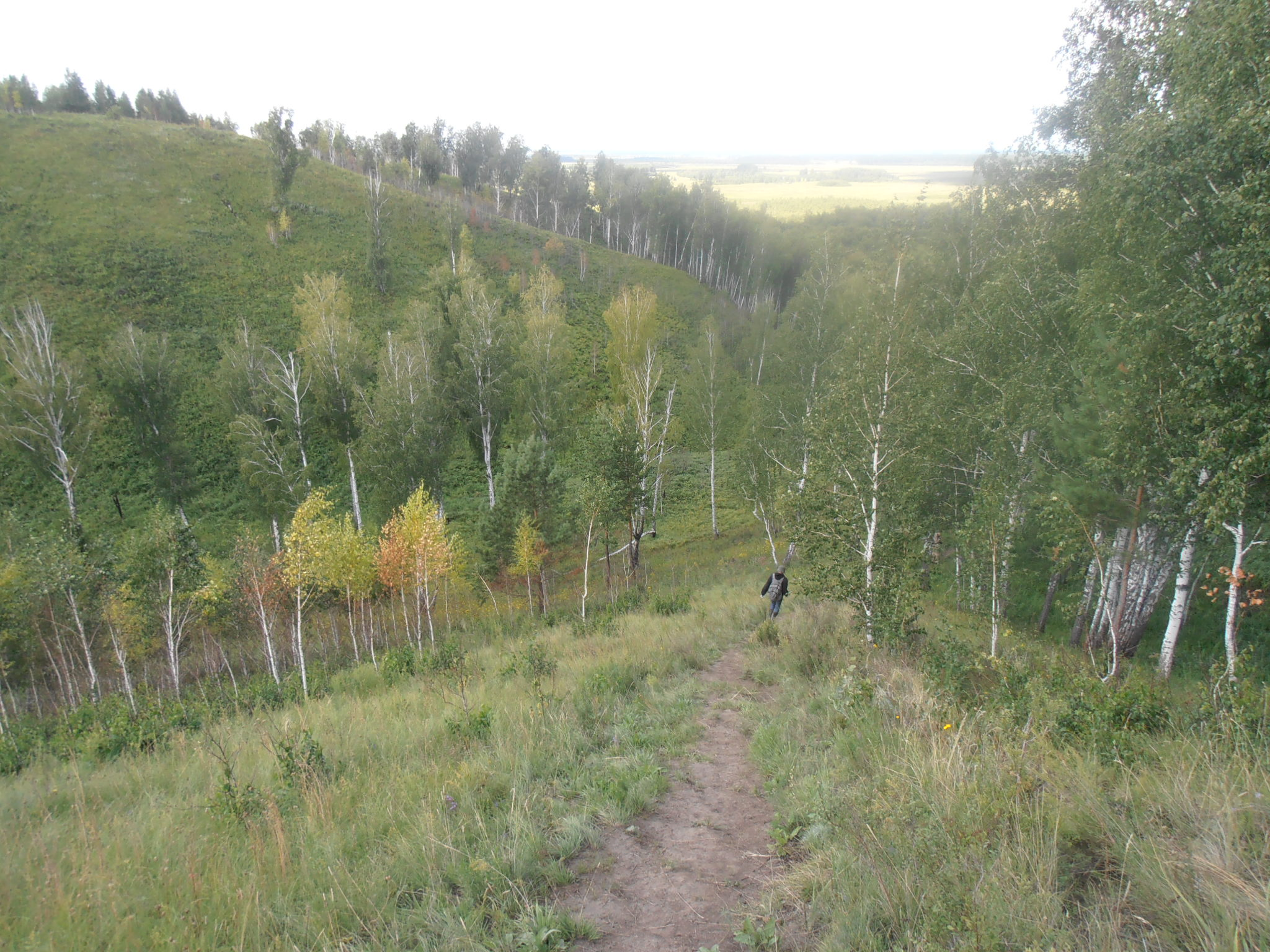
A descent on the right slope

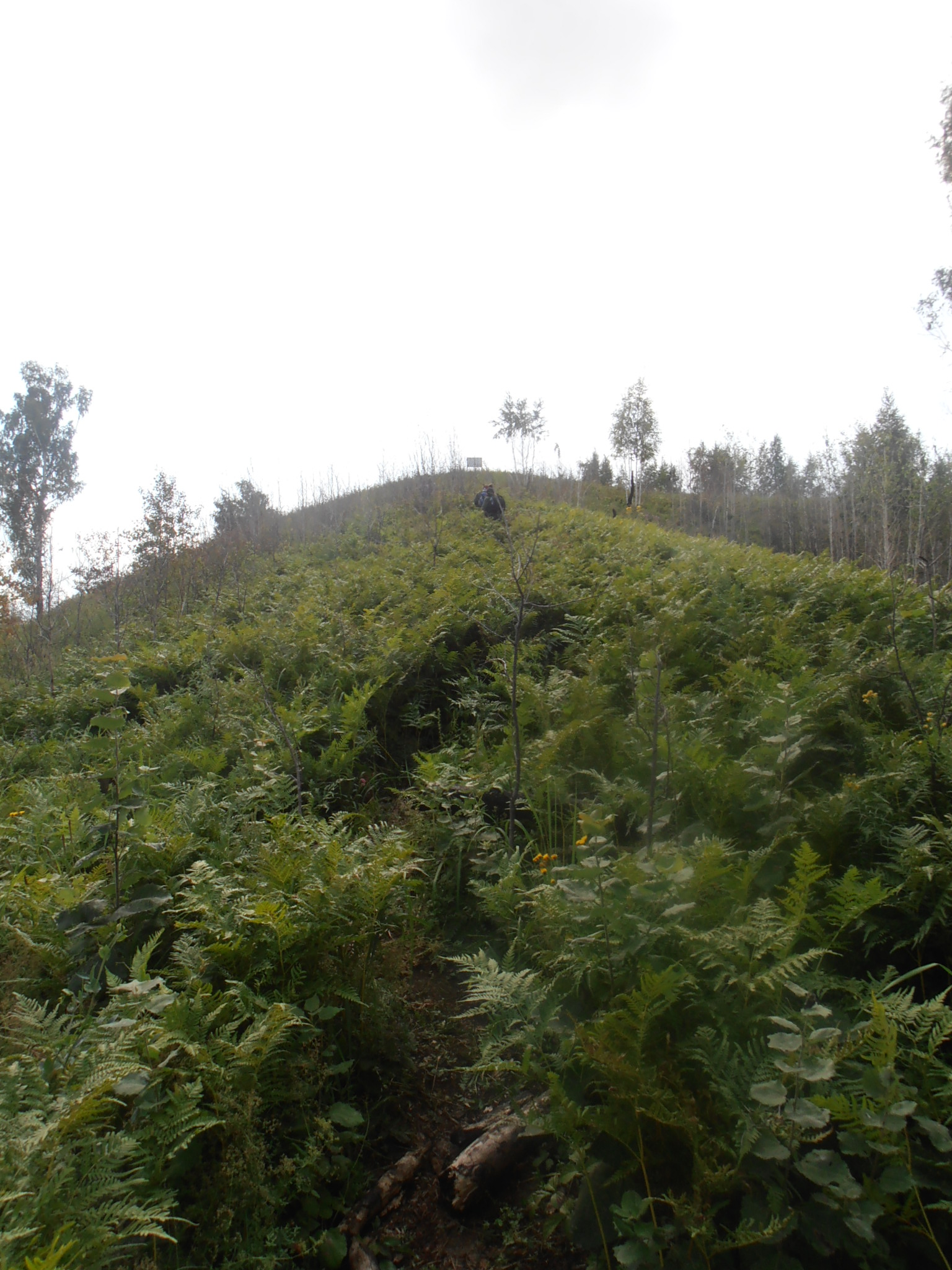
A rise of the left slope

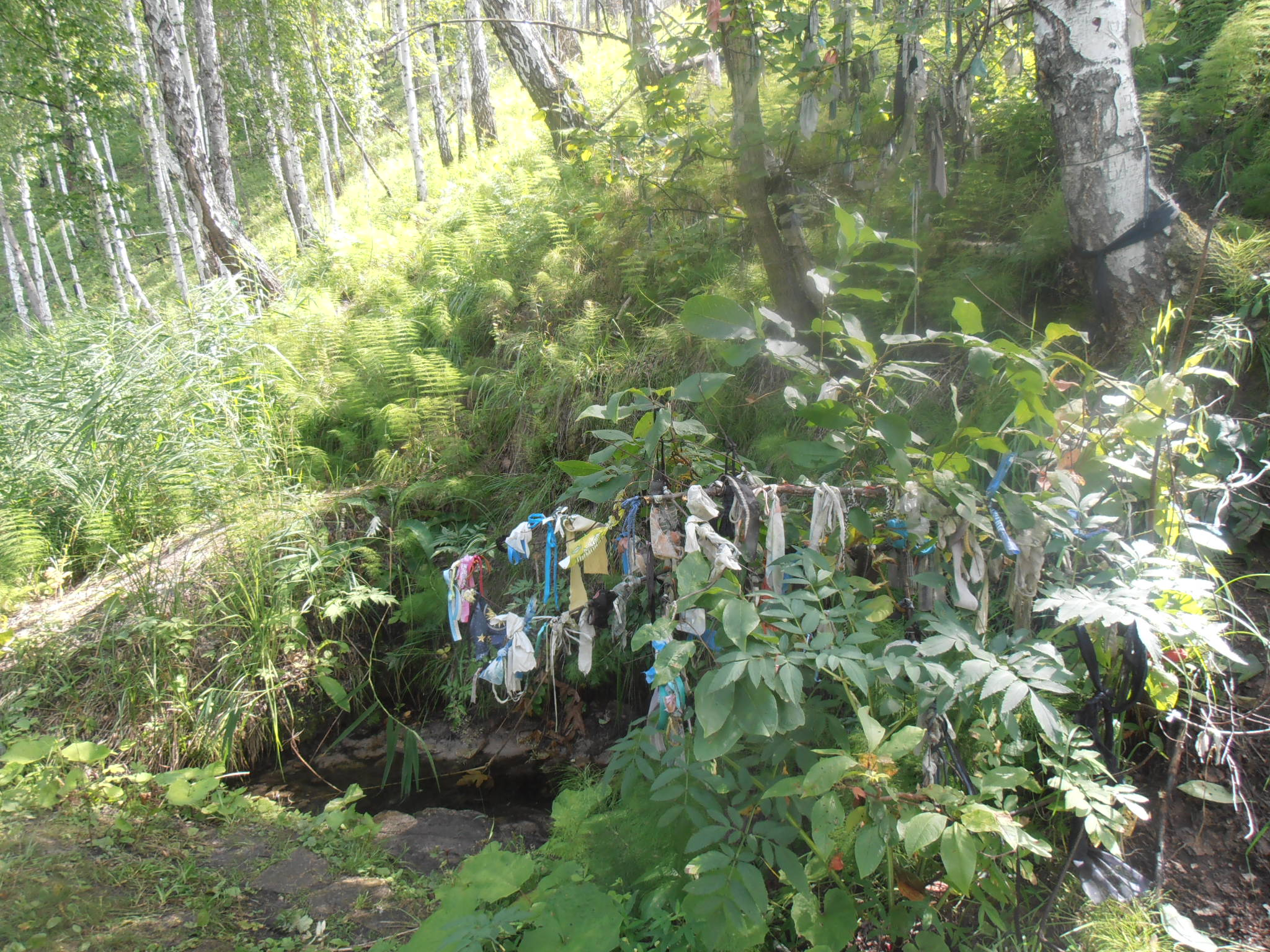
A spring at the bottom of the ravine. "Wedding" tree

== Bibliography ==
=== Scientific publications ===
- Adaev, Vladimir (2008). Matveeva, Natalya (ed.). "К реконструкции лодки из энеолитического могильника Бузан-3 в Ингальской долине (интерпретация с использованием данных этнографии)" [About reconstruction of the boat from the Chalcolithic burial Buzan-3 in Ingala Valley (An interpretation using data from ethnography)]. AB ORIGINE: проблемы генезиса культур Сибири (in Russian) (2). Tyumen, Russia: Publishing house "Три Т": 169–187.
- Anoshko O. M. (2001). "К вопросу о происхождении и периодизации бархатовской культуры позднего бронзового века лесостепного Зауралья" [On the origin and periodization of the Barkhatovo culture of the late Bronze Age in Trans-Urals steppe] (PDF). In Tishkin A. A. (ed.). Историко-культурное наследие Северной Азии: Итоги и перспективы изучения на рубеже тысячелетий. XLI Региональная археолого-этнографическая студенческая конференция (in Russian). Barnaul, Russia: Altai State University. pp. 262–264.
- Bakhareva T. N. (2001). "Алакульская керамика Хрипуновского могильника" [The Alakul ceramic of the Khripunova grave field] (PDF). In Tishkin A. A. (ed.). Историко-культурное наследие Северной Азии: Итоги и перспективы изучения на рубеже тысячелетий. XLI Региональная археолого-этнографическая студенческая конференция (in Russian). Barnaul, Russia: Altai State University. pp. 228–231.
- Matveev, Alexander (2004a). "Ингальская долина" [Ingala Valley]. In Kutsev, Gennady (ed.). Большая Тюменская энциклопедия. Volume 2: I-P (in Russian). Tyumen, Russia. p. 20. ISBN 5-88664-171-8.
- Matveev, Alexander (1998-01-09). "Снова об Ингальской долине" [On the Ingala Valley again]. Наука в Сибири (in Russian) (1–2). Novosibirsk, Russia: Siberian Branch of the Russian Academy of Sciences. Archived from the original on 2013-04-25.
- Matveeva N. P.; Volkov E. N.; Ryabogina N. E. (2003). Древности Ингальской долины: Новые памятники бронзового и раннего железного веков [Antiquities of the Ingala Valley: New monuments of the Bronze and early Iron Ages] (in Russian). Novosibirsk, Russia.
- Volkov, Eugene (2007). Комплекс археологических памятников Ингальская долина [A complex of archaeological sites the Ingala Valley] (in Russian). Novosibirsk, Russia. ISBN 978-5-02-031090-2.
- Volkov, Eugene (2006). Комплекс древних и средневековых памятников Ингальская долина [A complex of ancient and medieval monuments the Ingala Valley] (Thesis) (in Russian). Tyumen, Russia: Institute of Northern Development of the Siberian Branch of the Russian Academy of Sciences.

=== Popular issues ===
- Krivosheev S. (1996). "Истинные арийцы. Тюменские историки считают, что нашли прародину легендарных ариев" [The true Aryans. Tyumen historians believe to have found the Urheimat of the legendary Aryans]. Итоги (in Russian) (32). Moscow, Russia. Archived from the original on 2016-12-01.
- Matveev A. V.; et al. (2006). Археологический комплекс "Ингальская долина": путешествия во времени [Archaeological complex "Ingala Valley": a time travel] (in Russian). Tyumen, Russia.
- Matveev, Alexander (2004). Затерянный мир Ингальской долины [Lost world of the Ingala Valley] (in Russian). Tyumen, Russia. ISBN 587591-042-9.
- Pankina, Tatiana (2006-11-01). "Ингальская долина: почувствуйте себя немножко царями" [Ingala Valley: Just feel you as kings]. Вслух.ру (in Russian). Tyumen, Russia. Archived from the original on 2017-09-06.
- Pankina, Tatiana (2007). "Легенды Ингальской долины" [Legends of the Ingala Valley]. Отдых в России (in Russian) (39). Moscow, Russia. Archived from the original on 2016-03-11.
- Sitnikov, Pavel (2011-06-15). "Марьино ущелье или Где растут сибирские орхидеи" [Mary's ravine or where there are Siberian orchids]. Мегатюмень.ру (in Russian). Tyumen, Russia. Archived from the original on 2017-03-27.
- Spitsyna, Larisa (2006-12-22). "Зов веков" [Call of Ages]. Поиск (in Russian). Moscow, Russia: Russian Academy of Sciences. Archived from the original on 2013-04-25.
- Voinskiy, Todor (2010-07-14). "Загадочный мир Ингальской долины" [Mysterious world of the Ingala Valley]. АиФ в Западной Сибири (in Russian). Tyumen, Russia.
- Voinskiy, Todor (2011-09-28). "Сокровища Саргатии" [Treasures of Sargatia]. Тюменская правда (in Russian). Tyumen, Russia.
