= Isetsky (rural locality) =

Isetsky (Russian: Исетский; masculine), Isetskaya (Исетская; feminine), or Isetskoye (Исетское; neuter) is the name of several rural localities in Russia:

- Isetskoye, Sverdlovsk Oblast, a selo in Kamensky District of Sverdlovsk Oblast
- Isetskoye, Tyumen Oblast, a selo in Isetsky Rural Okrug of Isetsky District of Tyumen Oblast
