= Isetskoe =

Isetskoe may refer to:

- Isetskoe (Sverdlovsk Oblast), a village in the southern part of the Sverdlovsk Oblast
- Isetskoe (Tyumen Oblast), a village in the Tyumen Oblast
- Isetskoe (lake), a lake located 25 km from the city of Yekaterinburg, the source of the Iset River
- Isetskoe (beer), a brand of beer

== See also ==
- Iset River, Western Siberia, Russia
- Isetsky (disambiguation)
