= Isetsky =

Isetsky (masculine), Isetskaya (feminine), or Isetskoye (neuter) may refer to:

- Isetsky District, a district of Tyumen Oblast, Russia
- Isetsky (rural locality) (Isetskaya, Isetskoye), several rural localities in Russia

== See also ==
- Isetskoe (disambiguation)
