= Siberian Collection of Peter the Great =

Collection of Saka Animal gold artifacts

- Complete Siberian Collection of Peter the Great in the State Hermitage Museum. The right half of the display is for objects dated to the 6th-4th centuries BCE, while the left part covers the 3rd-1st centuries BCE.

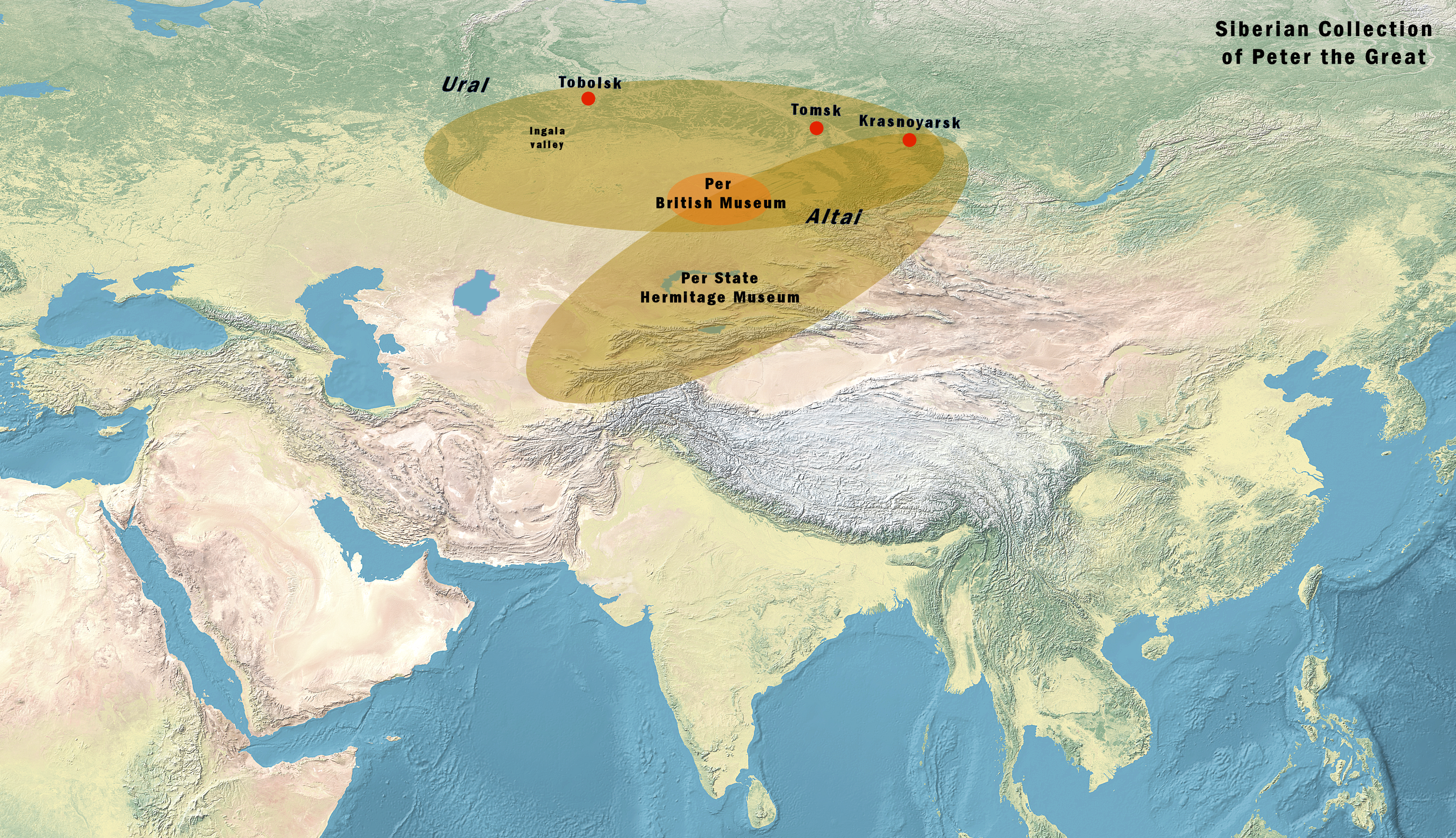
- Approximate locations of the finds of the Siberian Collection of Peter the Great. Per Pankova and Simson ( , British Museum), and per the State Hermitage Museum ( ).

The Siberian Collection of Peter the Great is a series of Saka Animal art gold artifacts that were discovered in Southern Siberia, from funeral kurgan tumuli, in mostly unrecorded locations in the area between modern Kazakhstan and the Altai Mountains. The objects are generally dated to the 6th to the 1st centuries BCE.

== Characteristics ==
The artifacts belong to the broadly defined Scythian Animal style, and are relatively late examples of this kind of ornaments. They are generally attributed to the Saka culture.

Many of these artifacts were part of the archaeological presents sent by Matvey Gagarin, Governor of Siberia based in the then capital of Siberia in Tobolsk, to Peter the Great in Saint-Petersburg in 1716. They are now located in the Hermitage Museum in Saint-Petersburg.

== Artifacts from the Ingala valley ==
Many Saka kurgans were excavated in the 17th-18th century in the Ingala valley, and helped establish the Siberian Collection of Peter the Great. Most of the objects initially obtained by Peter the Great were looted from the area of Tobolsk, the capital of Siberia, just north of the Ingala valley.

The first explorers of the valley were so-called bugrovschiki, robbers of ancient graves. In 1669, the governor of the Tobolsk rank Petr Ivanovich Godunov told tsar Alexei Mikhailovich that gold, silver items and utensils were extracted from "Tatar graves" near the Iset River. As a result of the tomb robbers, many treasures of the Siberian kurgans were lost forever. Some of the treasures extracted by bugrovschiki tomb robbers appeared in private collections abroad. The most famous was the collection of Amsterdam mayor Nicolaes Witsen; a part of it is known only from tables drawn in the third edition of his book Noord en Oost Tartatye (1785), and the collection was lost after 1717.

In 1712, a commander of Shadrinsk, prince Vasily Meshchersky, began excavations of kurgans to get gold, silver and copper items to replenish the state treasury by order of the Siberian governor prince Matvey Gagarin. During the years 1715-1717 governor Gagarin sent Siberian treasures to Peter the Great four times. 250 ancient gold jewelry pieces sent by Gagarin became known as the Siberian collection of Peter the Great, which is now available in the State Hermitage at the gallery of jewels called "The Scythian Gold".

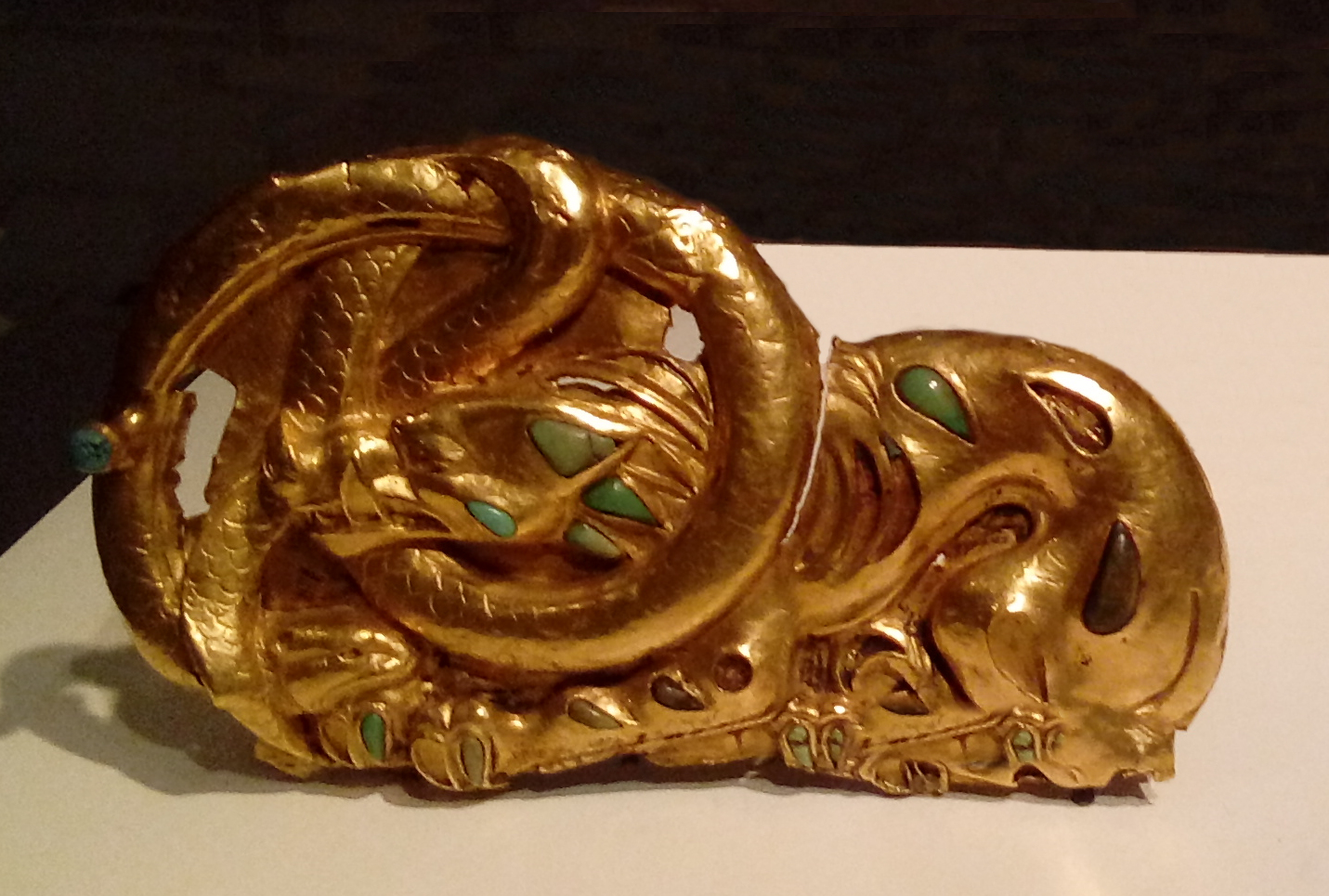
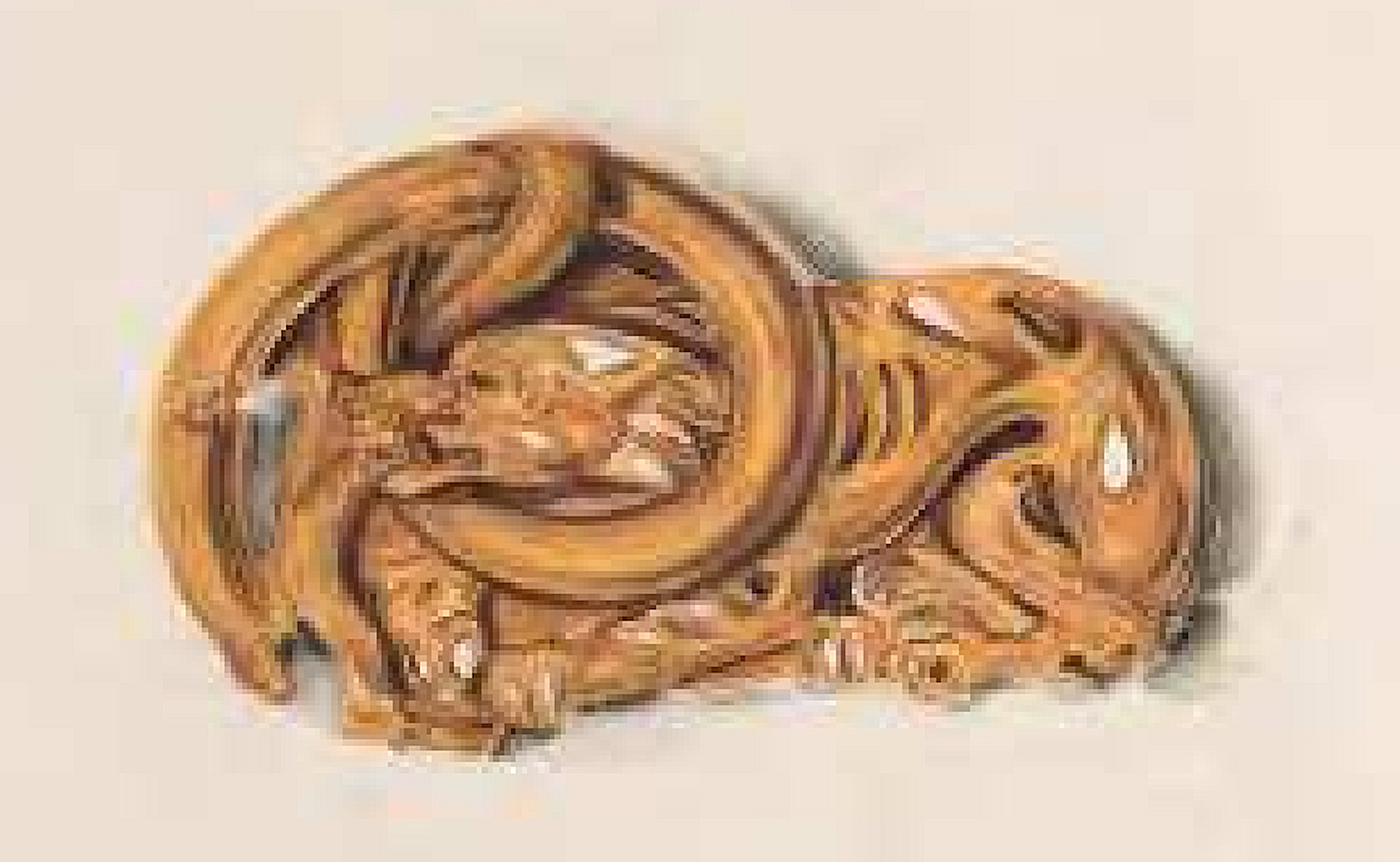
An ornate belt buckle from the Siberian Collection of Peter the Great, and its watercolour drawing from the 1730s.

Several of the objects from the Collection were painted in watercolor during the 1730s, which is helpful in setting up a chronology of the Collection, and refines ideas about provenance. Many of these early objects are known to have been sent by M. P. Gagarin, governor of Siberia in Tobolsk, in 1716.

Daniel Messerschmidt, whose expedition into the Siberia Governorate took place in 1719–1727, was the first scientist to get acquainted with findings of the Ingala Valley. But Gerhard Müller, who visited Siberia in 1733-1743 together with the Great Northern Expedition, stated that tomb-robber activity was finished because the kurgans had been totally depleted.

The Imperial archives of the discoveries were kept in Tobolsk, but they were lost in a fire in 1788.

Large grave robbing activities by military commanders in the areas of Tomsk and Krasnoyarsk are also recorded.

== Altai area ==
After the initial complement from the area of Tobolsk, a large portion of the objects now in the Collection may then have come from the area of the Altai steppe, between the rivers Ob and Irtysh.

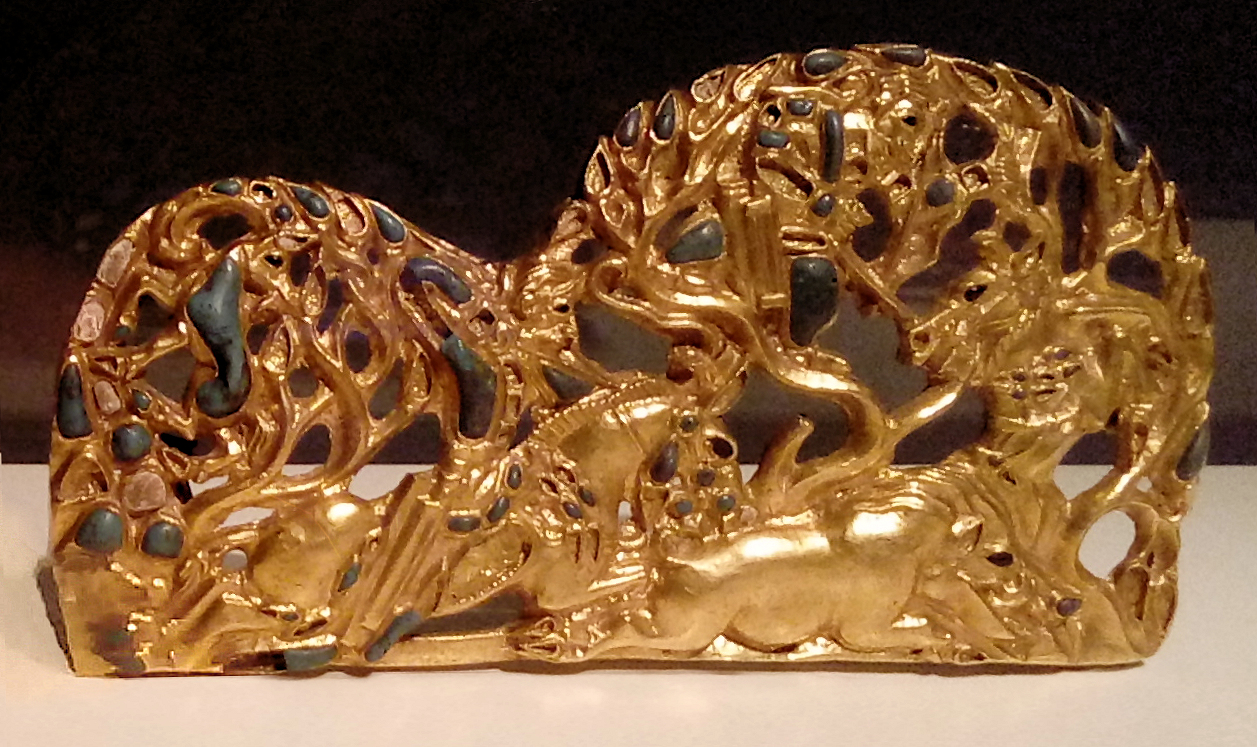
Boar hunter (Hermitage Museum). Circa 200 BCE. Sent by M. P. Gagarin, governor of Siberia in Tobolsk, 1716. Inventory number: Si 1726 - 1/69, 1/70.

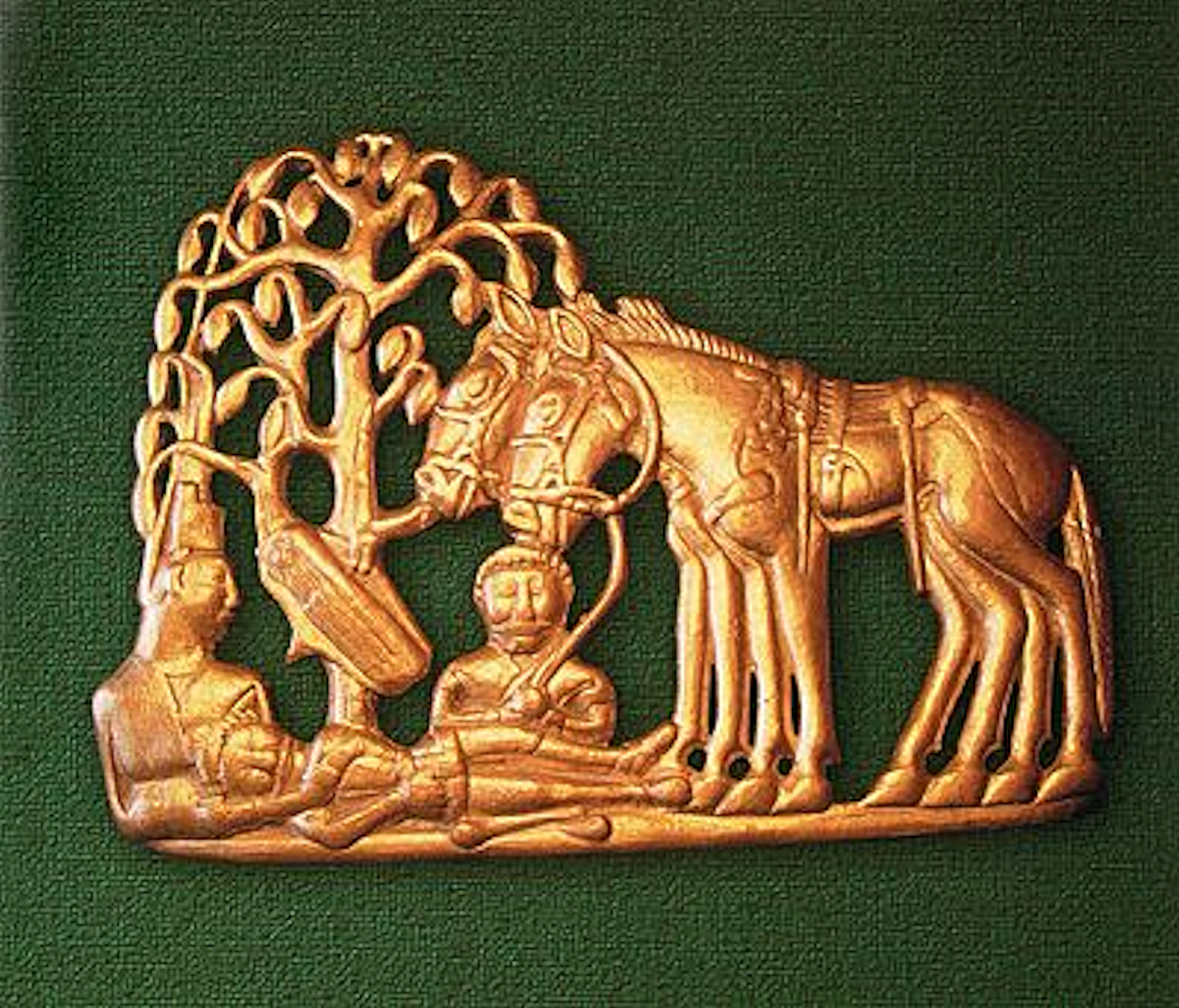
Belt plaque from the Siberian collection of Peter the Great, probably Ingala Valley: it was sent by M. P. Gagarin, governor of Siberia in Tobolsk, in 1716. Dated circa 300 BCE.

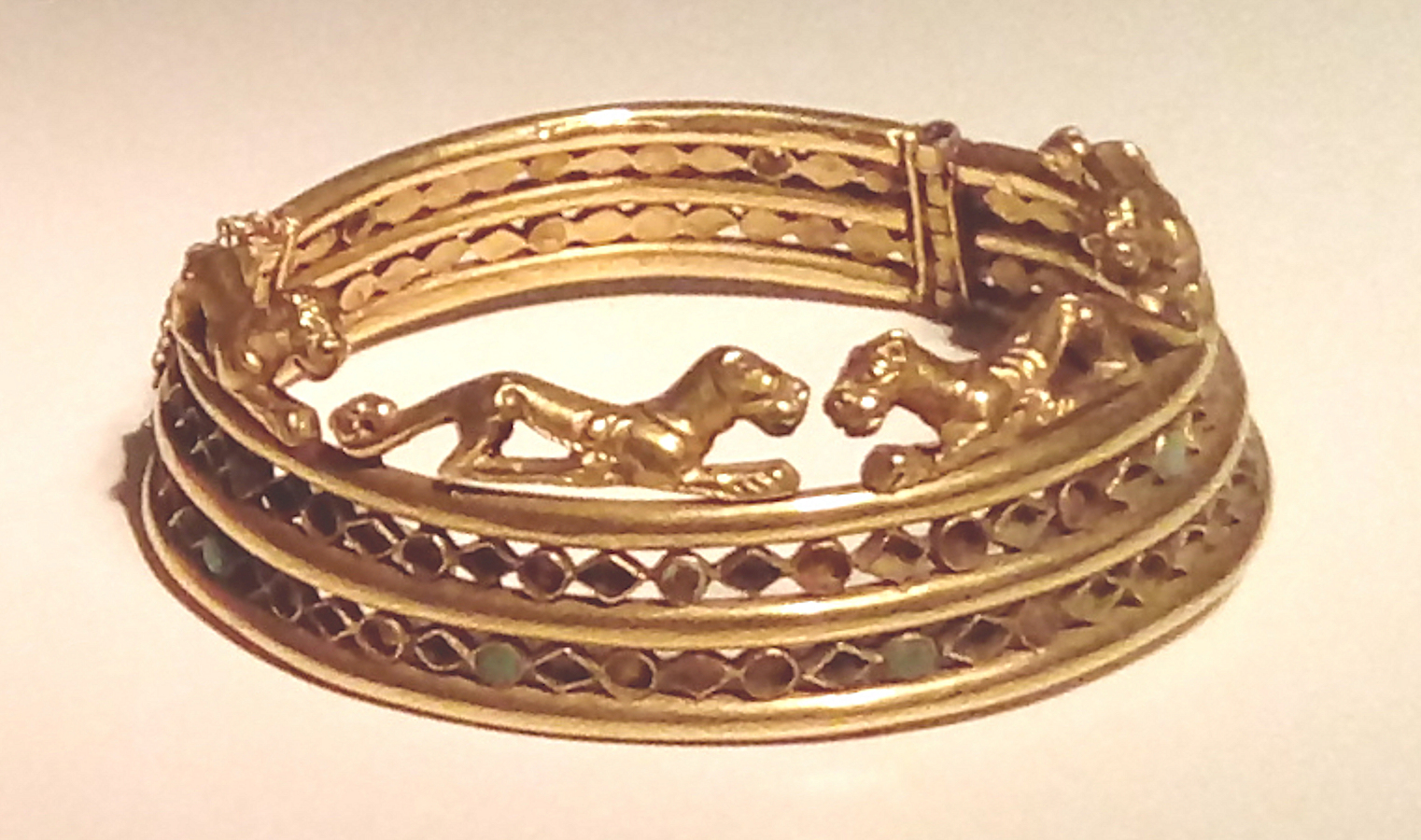
Torque with beasts of prey (2nd-1st century BCE)

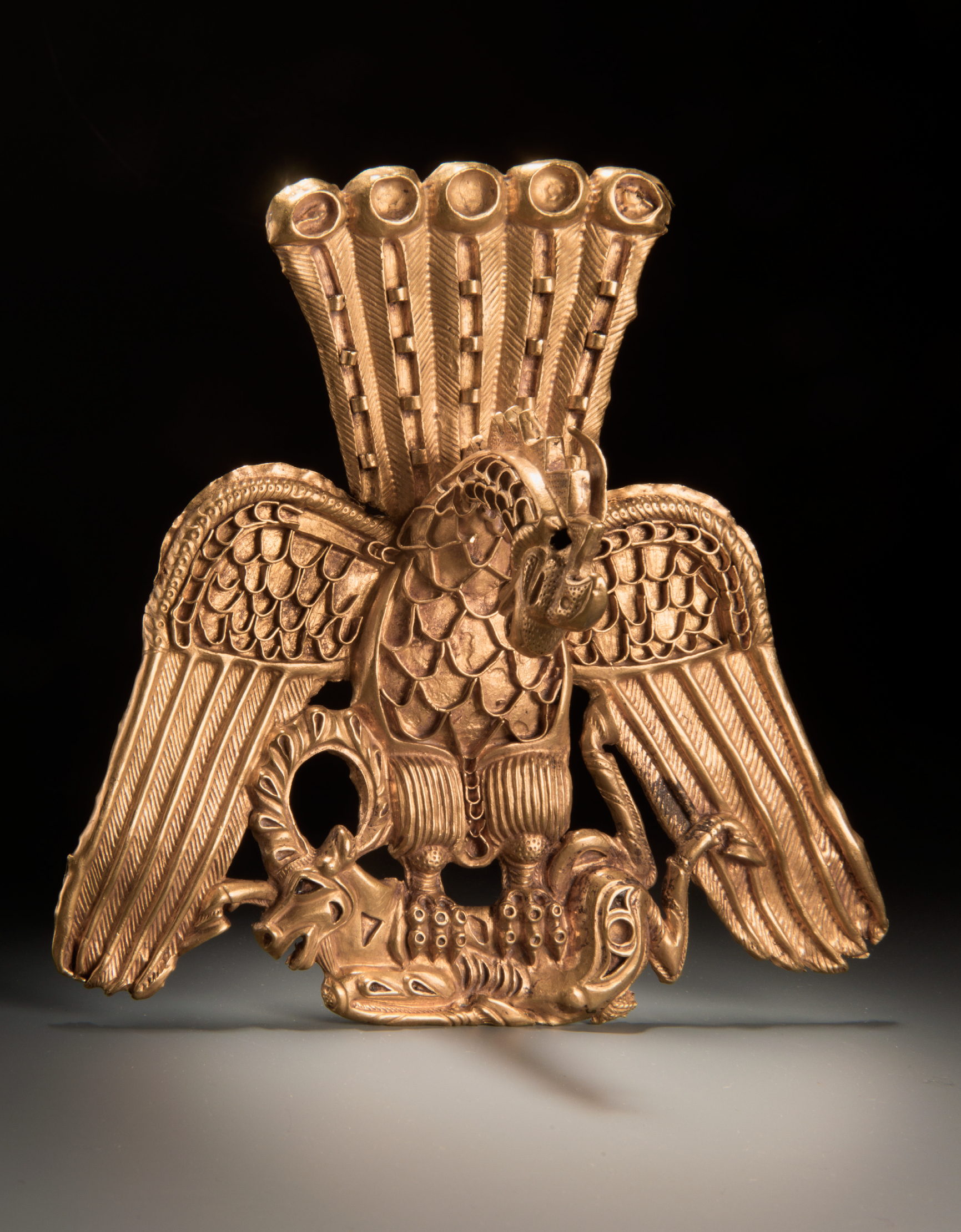
Aigrette

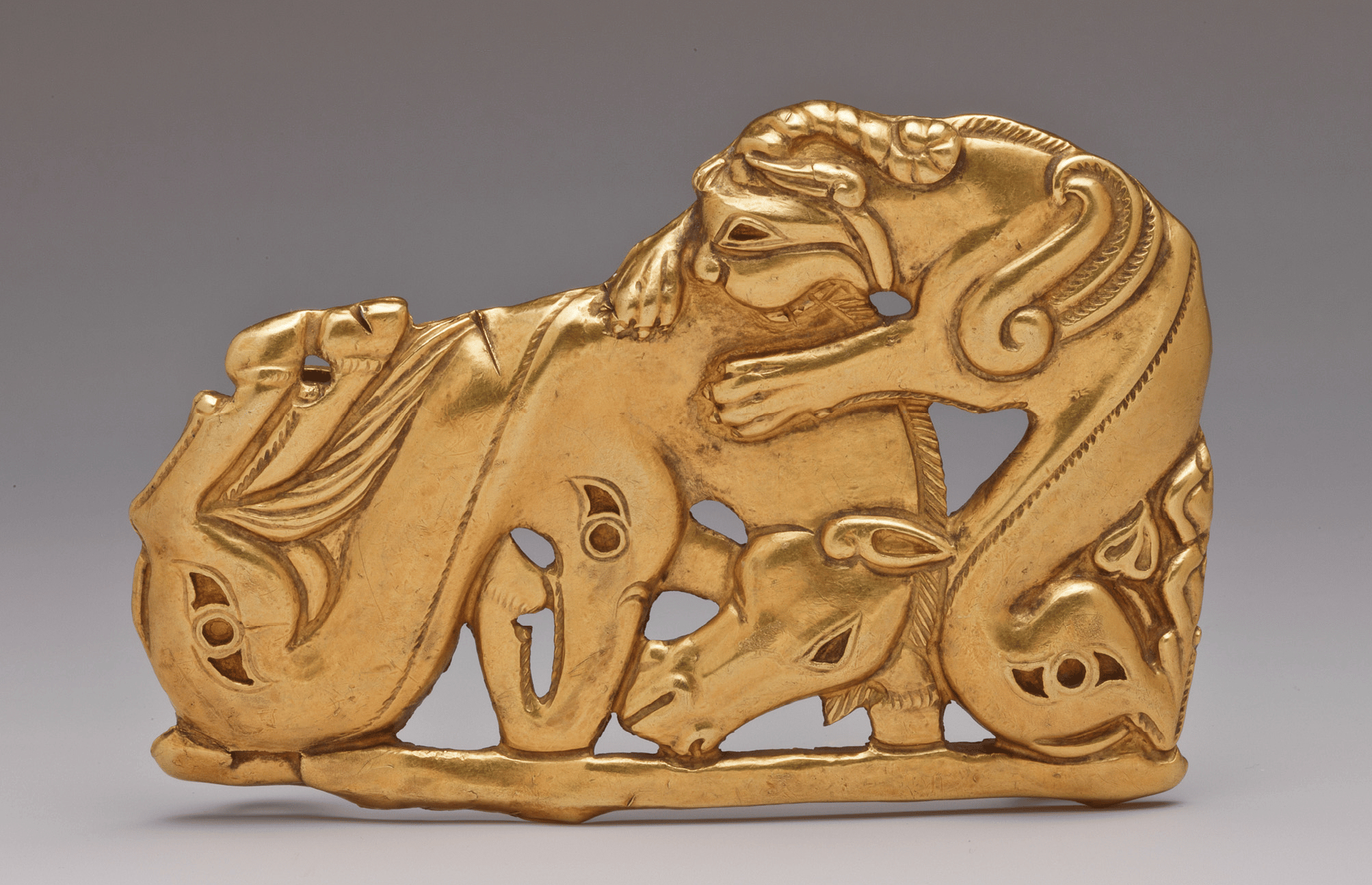
Belt plaque

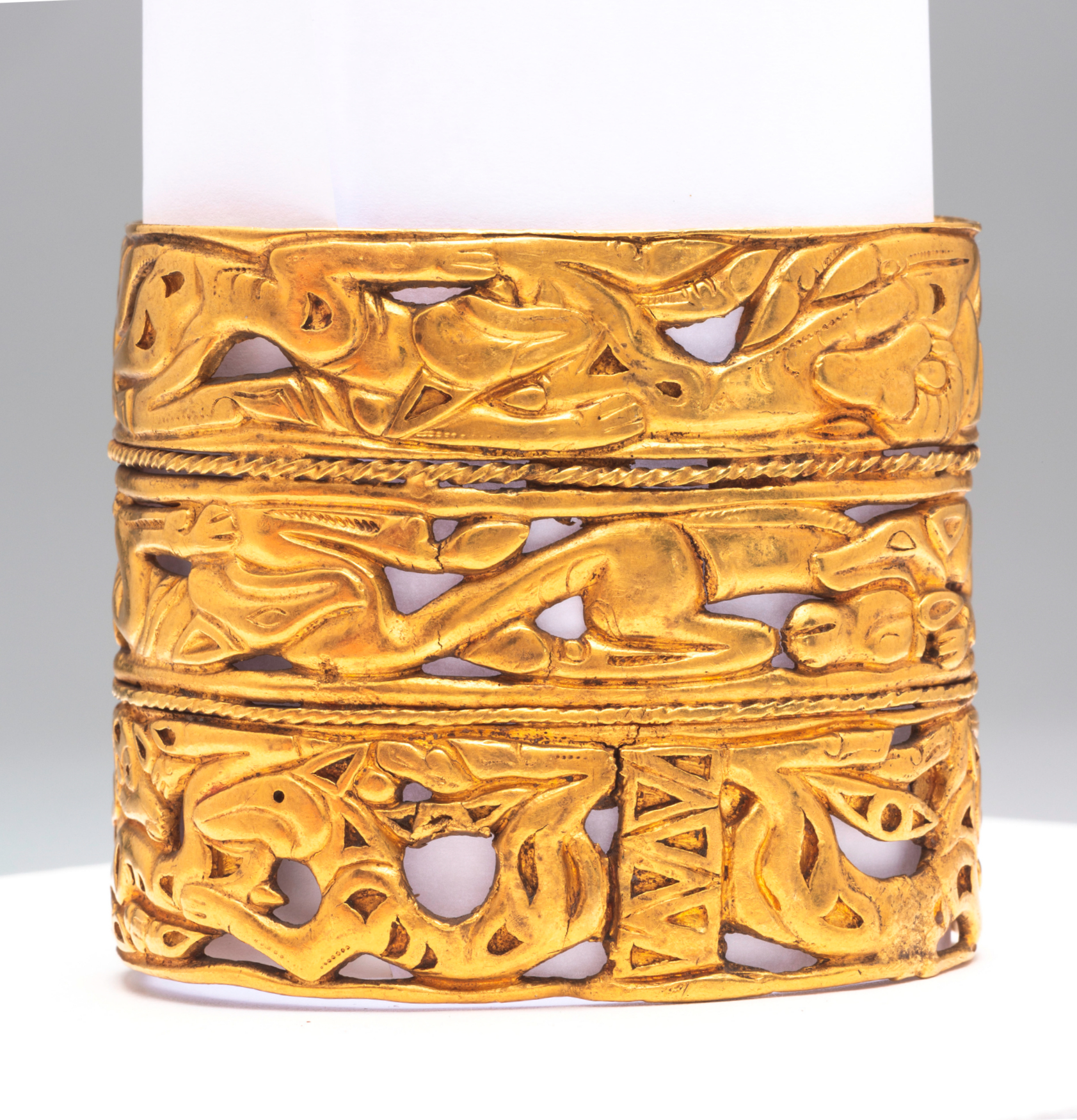
Bracelet

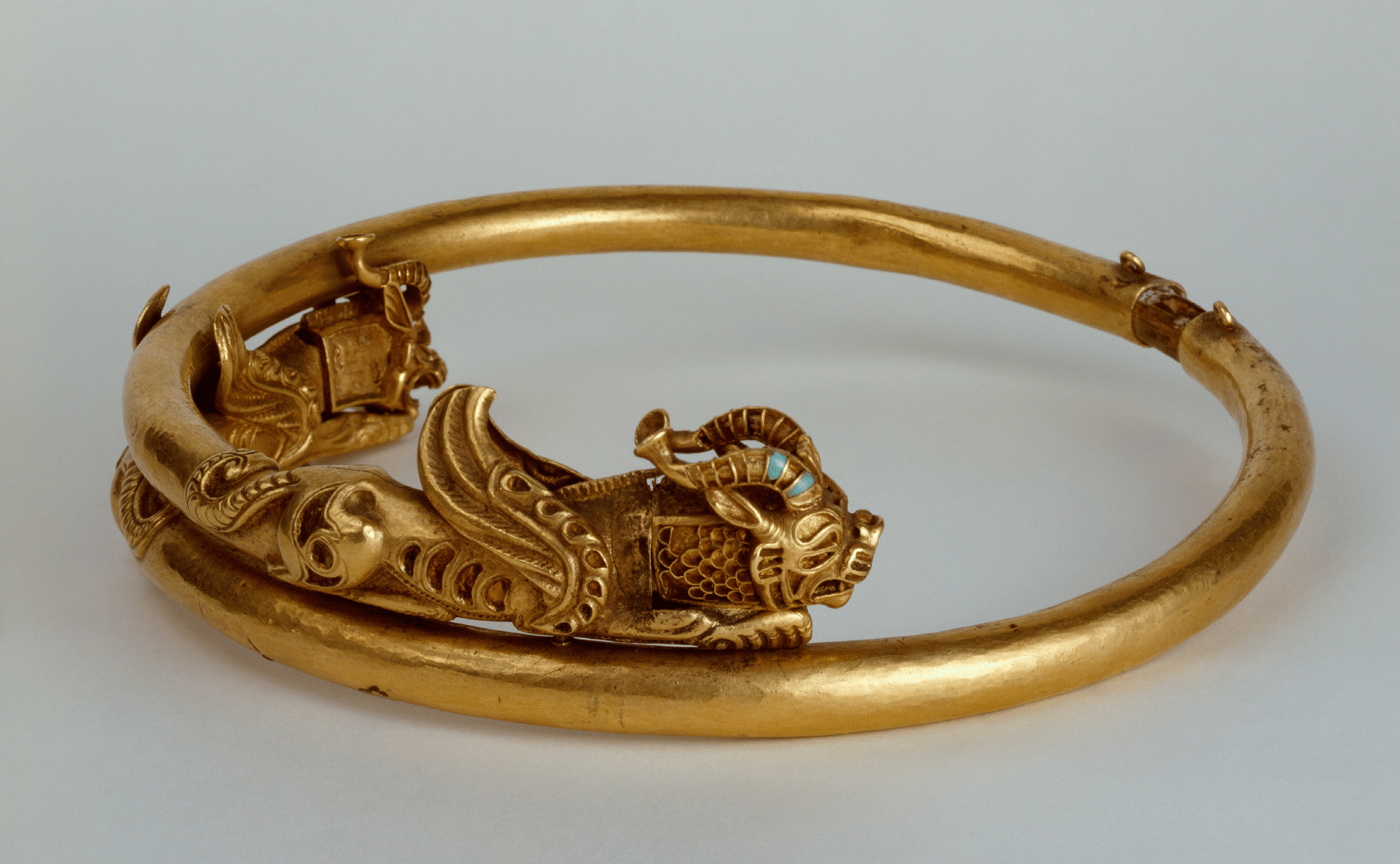
A torque

== Sources ==
- Pankova, Svetlana; Simpson, St John (1 January 2017). Scythians: warriors of ancient Siberia. British Museum exhibition catalogue.
- Volkov, Eugene (2006). Комплекс древних и средневековых памятников Ингальская долина [A complex of ancient and medieval monuments the Ingala Valley] (Thesis) (in Russian). Tyumen, Russia: Institute of Northern Development of the Siberian Branch of the Russian Academy of Sciences.
