= Evenki orthography =

Orthography of the Evenki language

Evenki orthography is the orthography of the Evenki language.

Multiple alphabets based on three different scripts have been and are currently being used, depending on the region. In Russia, a Cyrillic-based alphabet enjoys official status, while in China two scripts are used: Latin script (multiple versions) and the Mongolian script (experimentally).

== Preliterate period ==
Before the 20th century, the Evenki language had no orthography of its own. Material regarding the language was recorded in the 18th and 19th centuries repeatedly by various investigators, who used various orthographical systems in their writings.

The first Evenki texts were published in 1705 in a second edition of a book by Nicolaes Witsen "Noord en Oost Tartarye," which contains a translation of a prayer into Evenki, written in the Latin alphabet. Earlier, Evenki words were documented by Philip Johan von Strahlenberg, Peter Simon Pallas, Daniel Gottlieb Messerschmidt and other investigators. For their notes they used both the Latin alphabet and various Cyrillic alphabets. In 1865 the first scientific grammar of the Evenki language, written by Matthias Castrén, was published.

The first attempts to create an Evenki orthography were made by missionaries of the Bible Society in Russia. In 1818 they translated excerpts of the New Testament. The Cyrillic alphabet was used in the translations, which were never published after all. Some publications claim that "Тунгусский букварь" (in English, "Tungus language children's primer (or ABC-book), written 1858), as well as the dictionary and translation of the Gospel of Matthew that followed it, were in the Evenki language. However, in reality, these books were written in the Ola dialect of the Even language.

== Latin alphabets ==
The creation of Evenki orthography began in the 1920s. In May 1928, researcher Glafira Makar'yevna Vasilyevich wrote «Памятку тунгусам-отпускникам» (lit. Memo to Tungus vacationers) for Evenks studying in Leningrad. It was small textbook, duplicated on glass. In it was the Evenki Latin-based alphabet created by Vasilyevich. A year later she compiled the book «Первая книга для чтения на тунгусском языке,» or «Әwәnkil dukuwuntin,» lit. "First book for reading in the Tungus language." This alphabet had the following letters: Aa Bb Чч Dd Ӡӡ Ee Әә Gg Hh Ii Kk Ll Mm Nn Ŋŋ Oo Pp Rr Ss Tt Uu Ww Yy; it also included diacritic marks: a macron, to indicate a lengthened vowel and a sub-letter comma (modernist cedilla), to indicate palatalization.

In 1930 a decision was made to create writing systems for the majority of the peoples of the Northern USSR. The Latin alphabet was chosen as a graphic basis. In the same year Y. P Al'kor suggested the Evenki alphabet project. This project differed from the alphabet created by Vasilyevich only in the inclusion of letters used only in Russian loanwords (C c, F f, J j, Ш ш, Z z), and also the usage of the letter V v instead of W w, Ç ç instead of Ч ч, as well as the exclusion of the letter Y y. In May 1931 the Evenki Latin-based alphabet was officially confirmed, and in 1932 regular book publishing began, using the alphabet. The basis of the literary language was the more thoroughly researched Nepsky dialect (north of Irkutsk Oblast').

The official Latin-based alphabet, which was used in book publishing and school education, was thus:

| A a | B в | C c | D d | Ʒ ʒ | E e | Ə ə | Ə̄ ə̄ | F f |
| G g | H h | I i | J j | K k | L l | M m | N n | Ņ ņ |
| Ŋ ŋ | O o | P p | R r | S s | T t | U u | W w | Z z |

== Cyrillic ==
In 1937, like many other alphabets used by peoples of the USSR, the Evenki alphabet was changed to a Cyrillic-based one. Initially, it had the 33 letters of the Russian alphabet, plus the digraph Нг нг. In the 1950s this digraph was replaced by the letter Ӈ ӈ. At the same time the base of Evenki literature was translated to the Poligusov dialect.

The modern Evenki Cyillic-based alphabet contains 34 letters:

| А а | Б б | В в | Г г | Д д | Е е | Ё ё | Ж ж | З з | И и | Й й | К к |
|---|---|---|---|---|---|---|---|---|---|---|---|
| /a/ | /b/ | /v/ | /ɡ/,/ɣ/ | /d/,/dʒ/ | /je/ | /jo/ | /ʒ/ | /z~dz/ | /i/ | /j/ | /k/ |
| Л л | М м | Н н | Ӈ ӈ | О о | П п | Р р | С с | Т т | У у | Ф ф | Х х |
| /l/ | /m/ | /n/ | /ŋ/ | /ɔ/ | /p/ | /r/ | /s/ | /t/ | /ʊ/, /u/ | /f/ | /x/, /h/ |
| Ц ц | Ч ч | Ш ш | Щ щ | Ъ ъ | Ы ы | Ь ь | Э э | Ю ю | Я я | | |
| /ts/ | /tʃ/ | /ʃ/ | /ʃtʃ/ | /./ | /ə/, /ɨ/ | /ʲ/ | /e/ | /ju/ | /ja/ | | |

== China ==
In China there is no standard orthography for the Evenki language. Various main systems are used to document Evenki texts: a Latin-based, pinyin-like alphabet; Mongolian orthography (experimentally); as well as Chinese hieroglyphics.

=== Latin alphabets ===
There are a few variations of Latin spelling for Evenki. E.g., in the Evenki-Chinese dictionary "Ewengki nihang bilehu biteg," published in 1998, the following variant is used, proposed by Do Dōrji: A a, B b, C c, D d, E e, Ē ē, F f, G g, Ḡ ḡ, H h, I i, J j, K k, L l, M m, N n, Ng ng, Ɵ ō, O o, P p, Q q, R r, S s, T t, U u, V v, W w, X x, Y y, Z z. In another textbook of the Evenki language, a standard alphabet, with the addition of the letter Ө ө. There are also other variants of Latin spelling, based on the IPA.

=== Mongolian script ===
The Mongolian script is used experimentally.

The orthographic system developed by Chinese Evenki scholars reflects differences between Evenki and Mongol phonology. It uses both ᠬ and ᠭ (usually romanised from Mongolian as q and ɣ) for /g/. The system uses double letters in both Mongolian and Latin to represent most long vowels; however for /ɔː/ ao is written instead of oo. The same scholars' collection of songs has some orthographic differences from the table below; namely, long vowels are occasionally written not just doubled but also with an intervening silent ᠭ (ɣ), showing clear orthographic influence from the Mongolian language. In medial and final positions, t is written in the Manchu script form ᡨ. Evenki itself is spelled eweŋki, despite Mongolian orthography usually prohibiting the letter combination ŋk. The vowel inventory of this system is also rather different from that of Chaoke (1995, 2009).

| ᠠ a /a/ | ᠡ e /ə/ | ᠢ y*, i /i/ | ᠣ o /ʊ/ | ᠤ ō /ɔ/ | ᠥ u /o/ | ᠦ u /u/ | ᠧ* e /ə/ |
| ᠨ n /n/ | ᠩ ng /ŋ/ | ᠪ b /b/ | ᠫ p /p/ | ᠬ g /ɡ/ | ᠭ ḡ /ɣ/ | ᠮ m /m/ | ᠯ l /l/ |
| ᠰ s /s/ | ᠱ x, sh /ʃ/ | ᠲ t /t/ | ᠳ d /d/ | ᠴ q, ch /tʃ/ | ᠵ j, zh /dʐ/ | ᠶ y /j/ | ᠷ r /r/ |
| ᠸ w /w/ | ᠹ f /f/ | ᠺ k /k/ | ᠾ h /h/ | * used only word-initially |

== Comparison chart of Evenki alphabets ==
Compiled using:

| Cyrillic | Latin (USSR) | Latin (PRC) | Mongolian Script | IPA |
|---|---|---|---|---|
| А а | A a | А а | ᠠ | /a/ |
| Б б | B в | B b, W w | ᠪ, ᠸ | /b/, /w/ |
| В в | W w | V v | ᠣᠸ | /v/ |
| Г г | G g | G g | ᠭ | /ɡ/ |
| Г г | G g | Ḡ ḡ | ᠭ | /ɣ/ |
| Д д | D d | D d | ᠳ | /d/ |
| Д д | Ʒ ʒ | J j | ᠵ | /dʒ/ |
| Е е | E e | - | - | /je/ |
| Ё ё | (Jo jo) | - | - | /jo/ |
| Ж ж | Z z | - | - | /ʒ/ |
| З з | Z z | Z z | ᠽ | /z~dz/ |
| И и | I i | I i | ᠢ | /i/ |
| Й й | J j | Y y | ᠶ | /j/ |
| К к | K k | K k | ᠺ | /k/ |
| Л л | L l | L l | ᠯ | /l/ |
| М м | M m | M m | ᠮ | /m/ |
| Н н | N n | N n | ᠨ | /n/ |
| Ӈ ӈ | Ŋ ŋ | Ng ng | ᠩ | /ŋ/ |
| О о | O o | Ɵ ō | ᠤ | /ɔ/ |
| П п | P p | P p | ᠫ | /p/ |
| Р р | R r | R r | ᠷ | /r/ |
| С с | S s | S s | ᠰ | /s/ |
| Т т | T t | T t | ᠲ | /t/ |
| У у | U u | O o, U u | ᠣ | /ʊ/, /u/ |
| Ф ф | F f | F f | ᠹ | /f/ |
| Х х | H h | H h | ᠾ, ᠬ | /x/, /h/ |
| Ц ц | C c | C c | ᠼ | /ts/ |
| Ч ч | C c | Q q | ᠴ | /tʃ/ |
| Ш ш | S s | X x | ᠱ | /ʃ/ |
| Щ щ | S s | - | - | /ʃtʃ/ |
| Ъ ъ | - | - | - | - |
| Ы ы | - | E e | ᠧ | /ə/, /ɨ/ |
| Ь ь | - | - | - | - |
| Э э | Ə ə | Ē ē | ᠡ | /e/ |
| Ю ю | {Ju ju} | - | - | /ju/ |
| Я я | (Ja ja) | - | - | /ja/ |
