= Isetskoye, Sverdlovsk Oblast =

Isetskoye Исетское
- Village
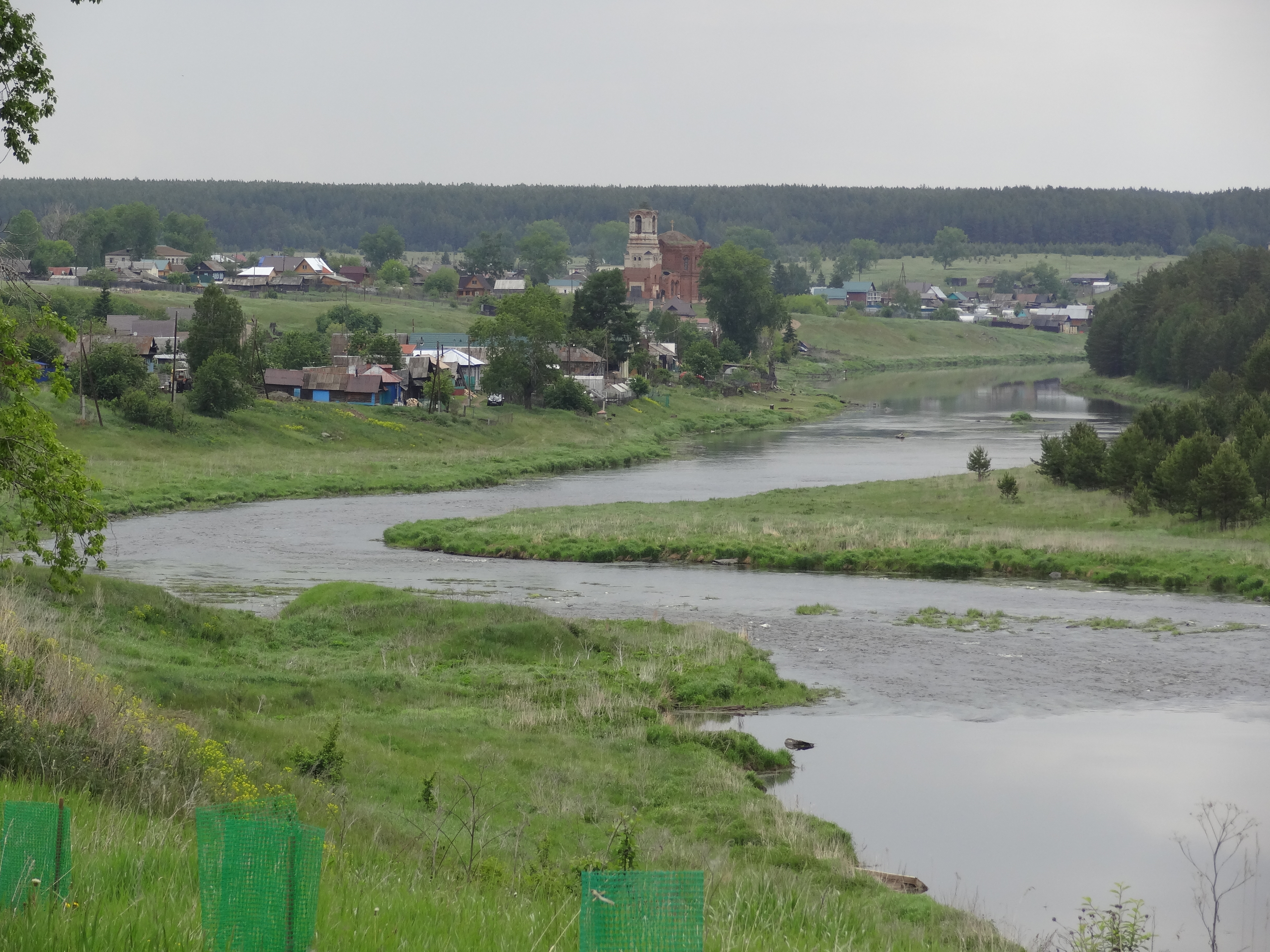
- General view
- Interactive map of Isetskoye
- Location of Isetskoye Isetskoye (Sverdlovsk Oblast)
- Coordinates: 56°27′13.38″N 61°31′24.99″E
- Country: Russia
- Federal subject: Sverdlovsk Oblast
- Administrative district: Kamensky District
- Founded: 1645
- Elevation: 195 m (640 ft)

Population (2010 Census)
  - Total: 173
  - Estimate (2010): 173 (0%)
- Time zone: UTC+5 (MSK+2)
- Postal code: 623480
- OKTMO ID: 65712000336

Isetskoye (Russian: Исетское, Isetskoye) (up to 1930 - Temnovskoye) - is a village in the Kamensky District of the southern part of the Sverdlovsk oblast, Russia.

== Geography ==
Isetskoye is located 90 km from Yekaterinburg. Maminskoye village administration includes it.

Through the village flows the Iset river. The plot of the Iset River has several rapids and shoals. There are several rafting routes to the Revun rapid. Rocky ridges are visible in the Eastern part of the village — outcrops of volcanic tuff (Greenstone rocks) Silurian system.

As the whole Sverdlovsk oblast Isetskoye is located in the time zone of Ekaterinburg. The offset from UTC is +5:00. Concerning Moscow time the time zone has a constant offset +2 hours and is designated in Russia as MSK+2.

== History ==
Temnaya settlement was founded around 1645 on the left side of the Iset river. Villagers were engaged in farming, carting and trading grain products. In 1702 the village was burnt by Bashkirs. Temnaya was rebuilt in several years. First church was built in 1845. It was named by St. Nicholas. The parish school was opened in March 1886. During the events of The Russian Revolution of 1905 the filial of the social democratic party was established by villagers.

The church`s building was made of wood. The Perm construction division has approved the final stone draft of the new Church in 1913. Construction work was carried out until the Russian Revolution of 1917. Funding was stopped. The priest of St. Nicholas Church was shot by bolsheviks. Later the building of church was burnt and half-destroyed.

== Population ==
Historical population

Year	Pop.	±%
1869	1,022	—
1901	1,342	+31.3%
1904	1,340	−0.1%
1908	1,641	+22.5%

Year	Pop.	±%
1926	1,374	−16.3%
2002	206	−85.0%
2010	173	−16.0%

== Transport ==
There is shuttle bus #102 twice a day (from Kamensk-Uralsky to Sosnovckoe). The nearest railway station is Perebor, 10 kilometers to northeast.

== Sightings ==
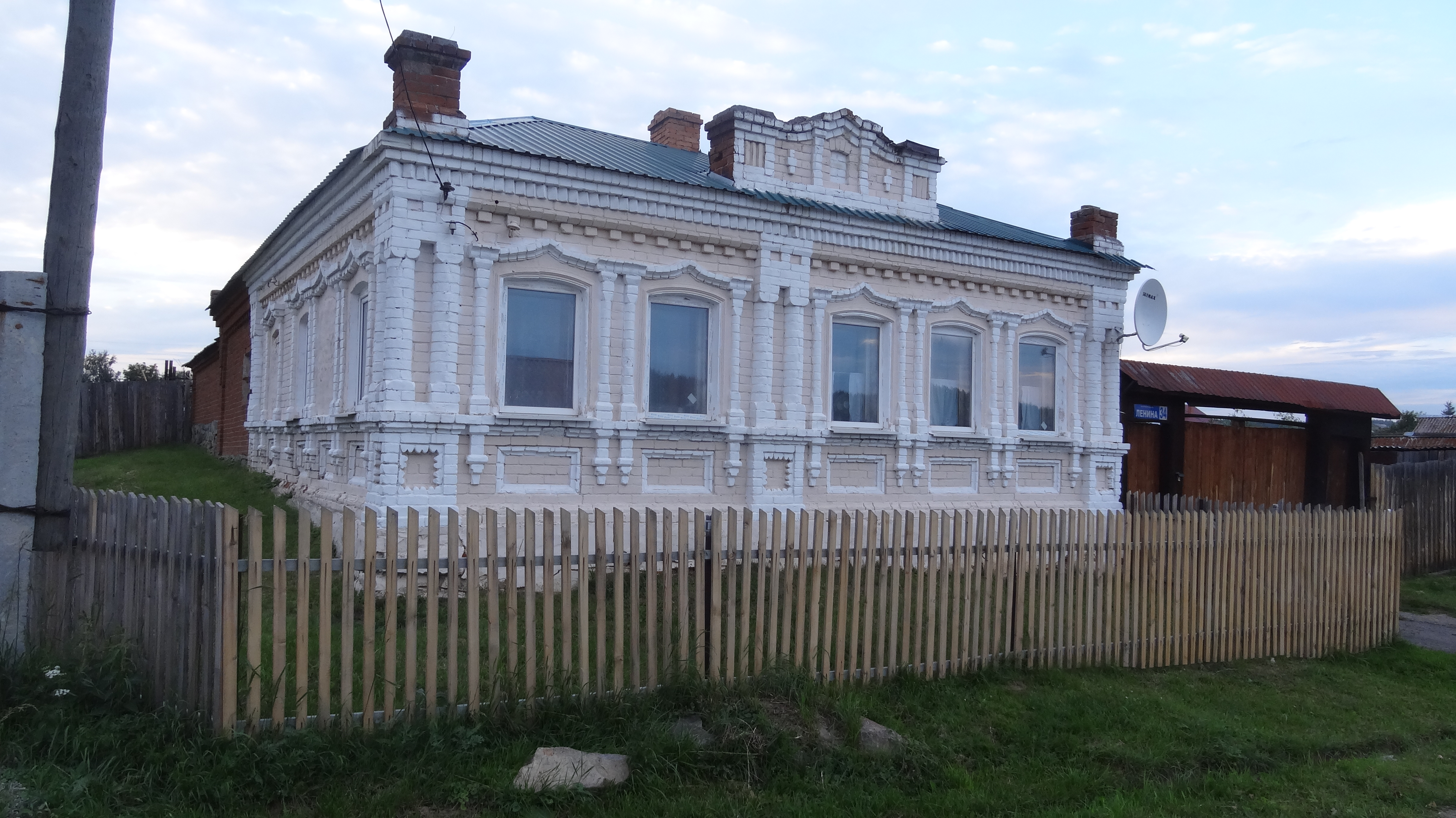
House in merchant style (as in restoration); 2015

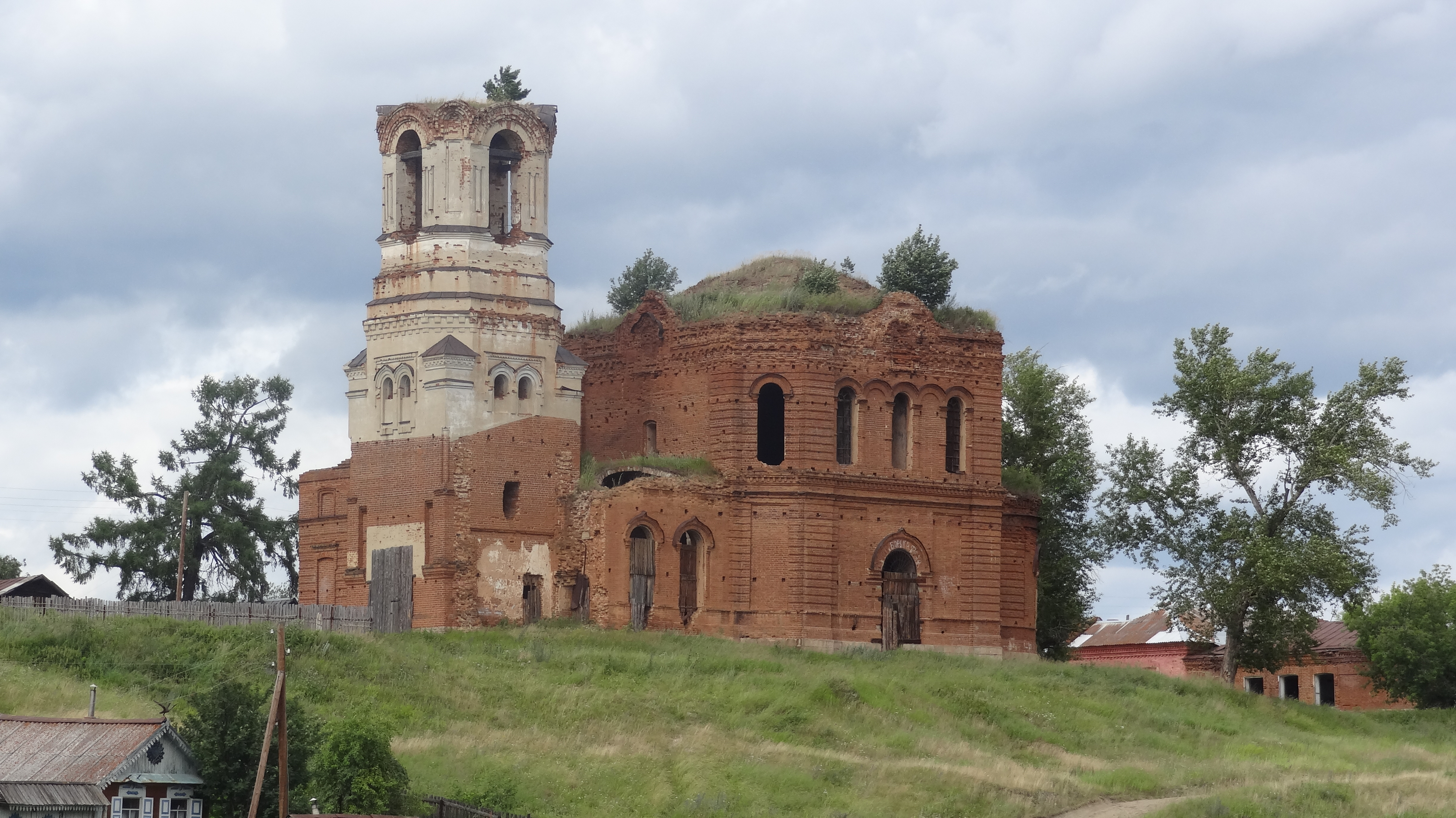
The current state of the Church (seen from the right bank of the Iset river); 2015
