= Isetsky District =

Isetsky District Исетский район (Russian)
- District
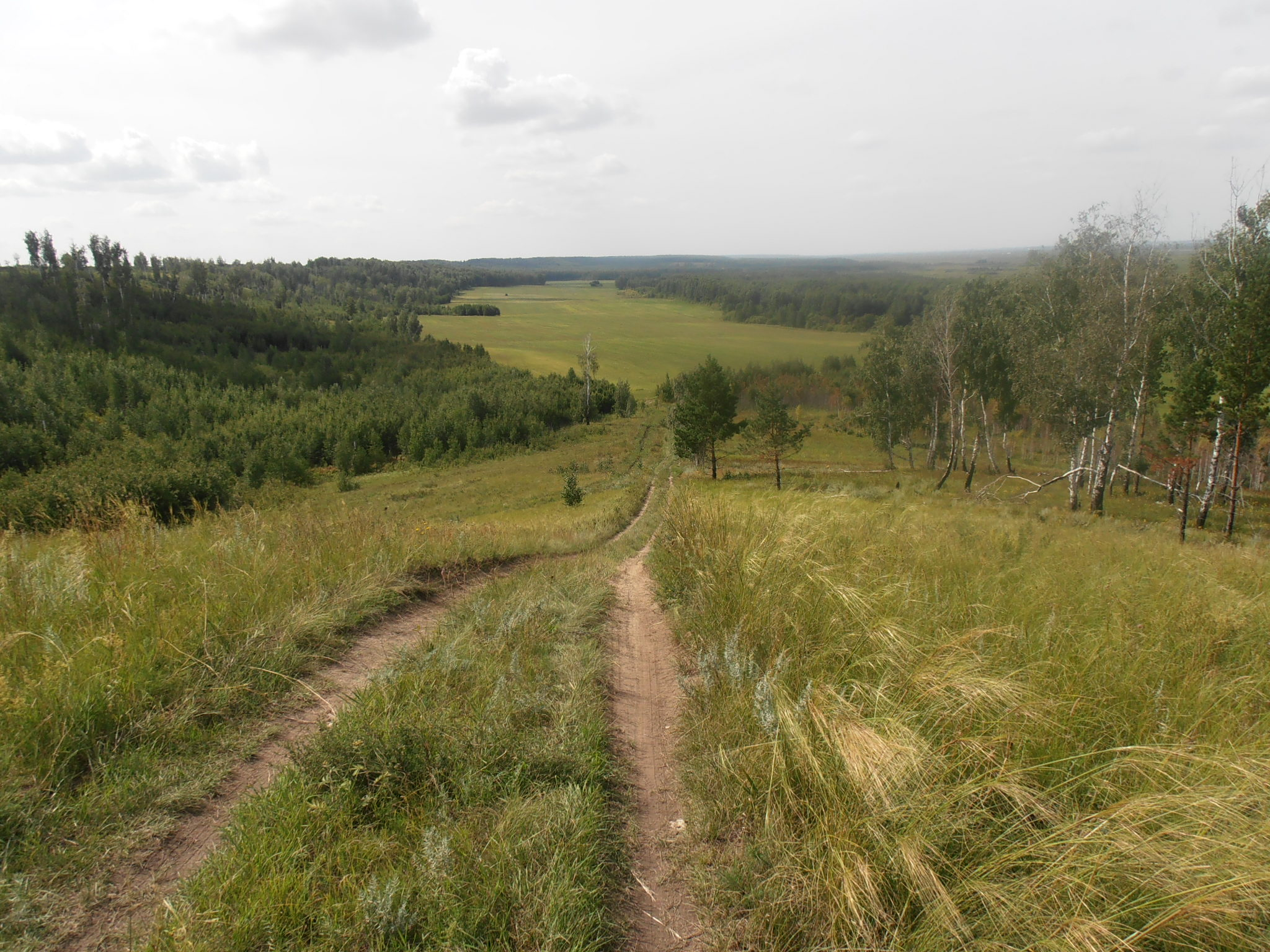
- Floodplain of the right bank of the Iset River, Isetsky District

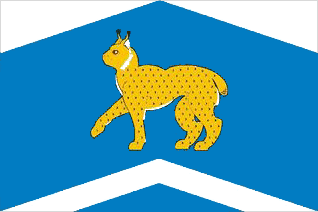
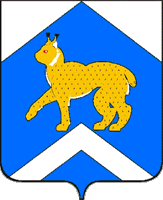
- Flag Coat of arms
- Location of Isetsky District in Tyumen Oblast
- Coordinates: 56°29′N 65°21′E
- Country: Russia
- Federal subject: Tyumen Oblast
- Established: 1923
- Administrative center: Isetskoye

Area
  - Total: 2,751 km^{2} (1,062 sq mi)

Population (2010 Census)
  - Total: 26,061
  - Density: 9.473/km^{2} (24.54/sq mi)
  - Urban: 0%
  - Rural: 100%

Administrative structure
  - Administrative divisions: 16 Rural okrugs
  - Inhabited localities: 41 rural localities

Municipal structure
  - Municipally incorporated as: Isetsky Municipal District
  - Municipal divisions: 0 urban settlements, 16 rural settlements
- Time zone: UTC+5 (MSK+2)
- OKTMO ID: 71624000
- Website: http://isetsk.admtyumen.ru/

Isetsky District (Russian: Исе́тский райо́н) is an administrative district (raion), one of the twenty-two in Tyumen Oblast, Russia. As a municipal division, it is incorporated as Isetsky Municipal District. It is located in the west of the oblast. The area of the district is 2,751 square kilometers (1,062 sq mi). Its administrative center is the rural locality (a selo) of Isetskoye. Population: 26,061 (2010 Census); 26,565 (2002 census); 25,862 (1989 Soviet census). The population of Isetskoye accounts for 28.7% of the district's total population.

== Geography ==
Isetsky District is located in the southwest of Tyumen Oblast, on the border with Kurgan Oblast and Sverdlovsk Oblast. The terrain is flat plain with a forest-steppe landscape. It is in the basin of the Iset River, which meanders from west to east through the middle of the district. The Iset meets the south-north flowing Tobol River about 20km east of the district. The administrative center is the town of Isetskoye, which is in the middle of the district at the intersection of a north-south highway ("Tyumen-Kurgan") and a west-east highway ("Yekaterinburg-Shadrinsk-Isetskoye-Yalutorovsk").

Isetsky District is 40 km south of the city of Tyumen, 260 km east of the city of Yekaterinburg, and 1,650 km east of Moscow. The area measures 60 km (north-south), 60 km (west-east); total area is 2751 km2 (about 0.003% of Tyumen Oblast).

The district is bordered on the north by Tyumensky District and Yalutorovsky District, on the east by Uporovsky District, on the south and west by Shatrovsky District of Kurgan Oblast, and on the northwest by Tugulymsky District of Sverdlovsk Oblast.

== History ==
The area has been inhabited since prehistoric times, with the oldest artifacts dated to the Mesolithic (7th-8th century BCE). In fact, a notable feature of the area is the extensive series of archaeological sites that run through the Iset River area. Over 500 archaeological sites, representing Stone, Bronze and Iron Age settlements, and others through the Middle Ages, have been mapped into a historic region known collectively known as the Ingala Valley.

The first settlers from Russia arrived in 1650 as part of a military line of defensive forts, including one on the Iset River. Early activity centered on the military uses, but also an early a monastery and a prison. In the 1700s, the fertile agricultural soil attracted colonists from central Russia, and woodworking industries developed around the timber and water-power resources. The first bridge across the Iset River in the district was specially constructed in 1837 for the drive-through visit of the Grand Duke Alexander Nikolayevich (the future Alexander II of Russia).

The area was part of Tobolsk Province from 1650 to 1738, but was merged into Isetsky Orenburg Province in 1738, and then in 1782 into Yalutavorsk Province until 1923.

Isetsky District was officially formed in November 1923 as part of the Ishimsky district of the Ural Region. After a brief move to Chelyabinsk region in 1934 and then to Omsk Oblast for 1934-1944, the district was finally transferred to Tymen Oblast in 1944.

== See also ==
- Ingala Valley

== Sources ==
- Тюменская областная Дума. Закон №53 от 4 ноября 1996 г. «Об административно-территориальном устройстве Тюменской области», в ред. Закона №47 от 7 мая 2015 г. «О внесении изменений в статьи 14 и 15 Закона Тюменской области "Об административно-территориальном устройстве Тюменской области"». Вступил в силу с момента официального опубликования. Опубликован: "Тюменские известия", №220, 12 ноября 1996 г. (Tyumen Oblast Duma. Law #53 of November 4, 1996 On the Administrative-Territorial Structure of Tyumen Oblast, as amended by the Law #47 of May 7, 2015 On Amending Articles 14 and 15 of the Law of Tyumen Oblast "On the Administrative-Territorial Structure of Tyumen Oblast". Effective as of the moment of official publication.).
- Тюменская областная Дума. Закон №263 от 5 ноября 2004 г. «Об установлении границ муниципальных образований Тюменской области и наделении их статусом муниципального района, городского округа и сельского поселения», в ред. Закона №39 от 7 мая 2015 г. «Об упразднении деревни Бурмистрова Балаганского сельского поселения Викуловского муниципального района Тюменской области и внесении изменений в отдельные Законы Тюменской области». Вступил в силу 1 января 2005 г. Опубликован: "Тюменская область сегодня", №213 (без приложений), 12 ноября 2004 г. (Tyumen Oblast Duma. Law #263 of November 5, 2004 On Establishing the Borders of the Municipal Formations of Tyumen Oblast and on Granting Them the Status of a Municipal District, Urban Okrug, and Rural Settlement, as amended by the Law #39 of May 7, 2015 On Abolishing the Village of Burmistrova in Balaganskoye Rural Settlement of Vikulovsky Municipal District of Tyumen Oblast and on Amending Various Laws of Tyumen Oblast. Effective as of January 1, 2005.).
