= Daniel Gottlieb Messerschmidt =

German physician and naturalist (1685–1735)

- Born: September 16, 1685; Danzig (Gdańsk), Kingdom of Poland
- Died: March 25, 1735 (aged 49); Saint Petersburg, Russian Empire
- Occupation: Physician
- Known for: Exploring Siberia

Daniel Gottlieb Messerschmidt (Russian: Да́ниэль Го́тлиб Ме́ссершмидт, romanized: Daniel Gotlib Messershmidt; September 16, 1685 – March 25, 1735) was a German physician, naturalist and geographer who lived in the Polish–Lithuanian Commonwealth and later in the Russian Empire. He was among the first to conduct a scientific exploration of Siberia, which led to the unearthing of the first fossil mammoth.

== Life and travels ==
Messerschmidt was born in Danzig (Gdańsk), then part of Royal Prussia in the Polish–Lithuanian Commonwealth, and studied medicine in Jena and Halle, where he obtained a doctorate degree on "... the brains as the predominant principle of all medical science" in 1713 and settled as a medical doctor in Danzig. He studied the natural history collections of Johann Philipp Breyne (1680–1764) and through Robert Erskine, superintendent of the Kunstkamera he was invited to St Petersburg. He arrived on April 9, 1718, and was introduced to the Russian emperor Peter the Great in 1716. By decree of November 5, 1718, Peter gave Messerschmidt the task to "collect rarities and medicinal plants" from Siberia and he reported to L. Blumentrost.

Messerschmidt set out from Moscow on September 5, 1719, through Nizhny Novgorod, Khlynov, Solikamsk, Turinsk, Tyumen, Tobolsk, Tomsk, Kuznetsk, Abakan, Krasnoyarsk, Achinsk, the Sayan Mountains, Mangazeya, the Lower Tunguska, Irkutsk, Nerchinsky Zavod and back. This was the first travel by a naturalist in this terra incognita, which came to last nearly eight years. He made numerous observations related to ethnology, zoology and botany and also excavated the first known fossil mammoth remains. Messerschmidt used two simple utensils for collecting data and artefacts, written diary notes and boxes, establishing a tradition for naturalist exploration to last a century. In Tobolsk, Messerschmidt met the Swedish lieutenant colonel Philip Johan von Strahlenberg, who had been taken prisoner at the Battle of Poltava and exiled to Siberia.

Strahlenberg accompanied Messerschmidt during several expeditions and later published some of Messerschmidt's observations. Messerschmidt explored lands all the way to Argun east of Lake Baikal. The journey, however, exhausted him, and he returned to Saint Petersburg in February 1728. Messerschmidt was paid 500 roubles as salary but his staff were often unpaid. He never became a member of the Academy of Sciences and died in poverty in 1735.

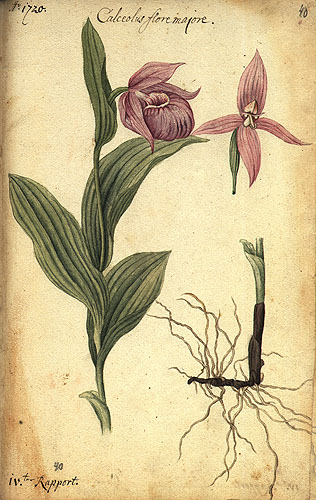
Cypripedium macranthon, described by Messerschmidt

Messerschmidt's notes and collections were, to the degree they were preserved, kept at the Academy of Sciences in Saint Petersburg. Pallas cited extracts of his journey log in his Neue nordischen Beyträge. Only much later were his full journal and maps published. In his travel journal with 202 sheets bound into a leather folio, he described 149 minerals, 1290 plants of which 359 were found only in Russia, and more than 260 vertebrates. Many of the notes were made by his assistants in Russian, while he wrote in German. A statue is erected in his memory in Khanty-Mansiysk.

== Literature ==
- Han F. Vermeulen: 'Enlightenment and Pietism. D. G. Messerschmidt and the Early Exploration of Siberia'. (=Ch.3). In: Han F. Vermeulen: Before Boas. The Genesis of Ethnography and Ethnology in the German Enlightenment. Lincoln & London, University of Nebraska Press, 2016. ISBN 978-0-8032-5542-5

== Sources ==
- "Мессершмидт, Даниил-Готлиб" . Brockhaus and Efron Encyclopedic Dictionary (in Russian). 1906.
