= Isetskoye, Tyumen Oblast =

Rural locality in Tyumen Oblast, Russia

Coordinates: 56°29′00″N 65°19′22″E

Isetskoye (Russian: Исетское) is a rural locality (a selo) and the administrative center of Isetsky District, Tyumen Oblast, Russia. Population: 7,479 (2010 census); 7,216 (2002 census); 6,954 (1989 Soviet census).
