= Magna Hungaria =

Ancestral home of the Hungarians

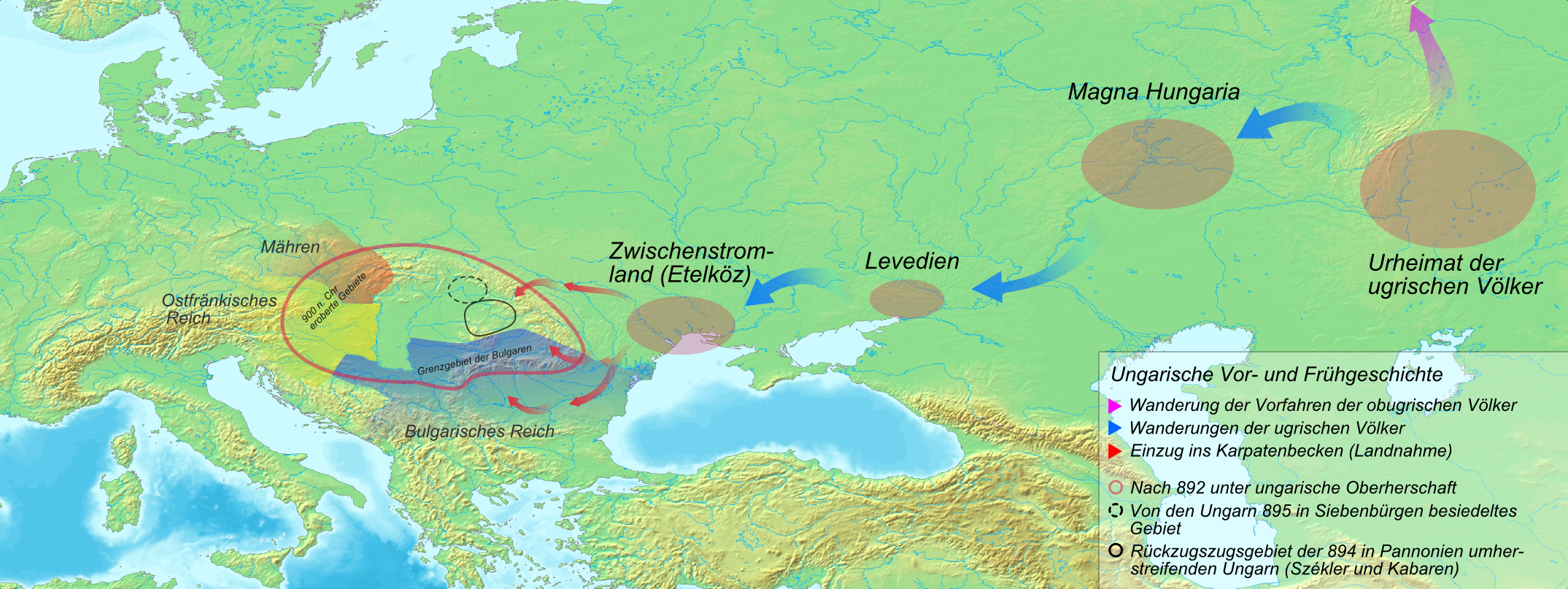
The migration of ancient Hungarians from a supposed Magna Hungaria to central Europe

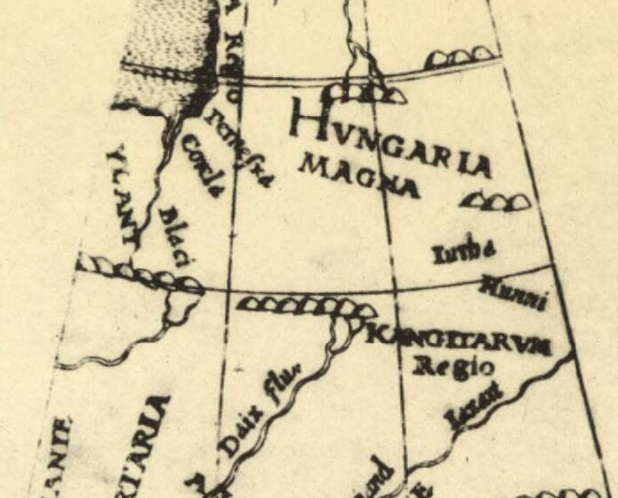
Magna Hungaria theorised on the Johannes Schöner's terrestrial globe (1523/24)

Magna Hungaria (Latin: Magna Hungaria, Hungaria maior), literally "Great Hungary" or "Ancient Hungary", refers to the ancestral home of the Hungarians, the location of which is still subject to historiographical debate.

Magna Hungaria was mentioned by the thirteenth-century Franciscan Giovanni da Plano Carpini in his reports of his travels in Northern Asia and Central Asia. Friar Julian, a thirteenth century Hungarian monk and explorer, also visited Magna Hungaria in the interest of finding the Eastern Hungarians, the group of Hungarians that travelled east rather than west with the rest of the people towards the Carpathian Basin during the ninth century.

According to mainstream historiography, Magna Hungaria was located in the forest-steppe regions of Bashkortostan, now part of Russia or more precisely in the area of the Kushnarenkovo and Karayakupovo cultures, in the region of the Southern Urals.

== Background ==
In the 1230s, inspired by the version provided by a Hungarian chronicle, Friar Julian set out in search of the legendary homeland of the Magyars, Magna Hungaria, after learning of its existence and the fact that a group of Hungarians had separated from others by not moving towards Eastern Europe. During his journey, he encountered a Hungarian-speaking population "near the great Etil River", identified by researchers as the Volga or the Kama. The lands to which the clergyman goes are those of the Volga Bulgarians and are located in present-day Bashkiria, in the southern European part of Russia. The academic controversy over whether Magna Hungaria is actually the original home of the Magyars or whether they settled there during their westward migration from the West Siberian Plain is doomed to remain unanswered. According to a different scientific hypothesis, Magna Hungaria is neither the original home of the Magyars nor their first permanent stop on their long journey towards Europe. Indeed, according to this hypothesis, the ancestors of the Eastern Magyars met by Brother Julien would have moved towards Magna Hungaria from the south.

According to another academic hypothesis, the name of at least one Magyar tribe, probably that of the Gyarmat, is linked to the name of a Bashkir population group, the Yurmatï. Traditional funeral rites, notably the use of death masks, as well as the presence of parts of horses in the tombs, could be reconstructed thanks to the discovery of a cemetery dating from the 9th or 10th century and located at the confluence of the Volga and the Kama, near present-day Bolshie Tigany (Большие Тиганы, Alexeyevsky District, Republic of Tatarstan). It is interesting to note that the two uses mentioned above are also found in Hungarian burial sites located in the Carpathian basin and dating from the 10th century. Most researchers claim that the Bolshie Tigany cemetery was used by Magyars who remained in Magna Hungaria when other groups left the territory, or who came from other regions inhabited by the Magyars during their migrations.

If the original home of the Magyars was in Western Siberia, rather than Magna Hungaria, their ancestors moved from Western Siberia towards Eastern Europe. This movement probably occurred during the period between 500 BC and 700 AD, a period during which the steppes became a heavily used place of passage. An important point of reference for historians is that of the culture of Prohorovo, which, according to available archaeological data, certainly spread to the present-day region of Bashkiria around 400 BC. The migration of the Huns towards the west forced many population groups established in Western Siberia to flee towards Europe between 350 and 400 AD. circa 550 B.C. move.

The arrival of the Huns put an end to the domination of the Iranian peoples over the Eurasian steppes. Subsequently, the Sabirs, Avars, Onogurs, Khazars, as well as other Turkic peoples kept the grasslands of the Eastern Europe more or less continuously for several centuries. Abu Saʿīd Gardēzī, a Persian geographer and historian active during the first half of the 11th century, ventured to consider the Magyars as being “a branch of the Turks”, a form of description taken up by Leo VI the Wise and Constantine VII Porphyrogenitus. Linguists have laboriously reconstructed the approximately 450 Hungarian terms borrowed from Turkic languages before the year 900. Certain particularly atavistic characteristics of the songs Hungarian folklore shows similarities with those of the Chuvashes, a Turkic ethnic group established mainly in Russia and Kazakhstan. Based on these characteristics, it is concluded that the Magyars were closely related to the Turks during the long period that they spent in the Pontic steppes.

== See also ==
- Dentumoger
- Proto-Uralic homeland
- Uralic languages

== Literature ==
1. Аннинский С. А. Известия венгерских миссионеров XIII-XIV вв. о татарах и восточной Европе // Исторический архив. — 1940. — No. 3. — С. 71–76.
2. Иванов В.А. Путями степных кочевий. Уфа, Башкнижиздат, 1984, С. 38-58.

1.Macartney 1953, p. 85-86. 2.Fodor 1975, p. 197. 3.Fodor 1975, p. 198 & 201. 4.Róna-Tas 1999, p. 429. 5.Tóth 1998, p. 15. 6.Fodor 1975, p. 201. 7.Kristó 1996, p. 87. 8.Kristó 1996, p. 68. 9.Kristó 1996, p. 67-68. 10.Fodor 1975, p. 122-123. 11.Róna-Tas 1999, p. 121 & 429. 12.Kristó 1996, p. 32. 13.Fodor 1975, p. 202. 14.Fodor 1975, p. 203. 15.Róna-Tas 1999, p. 209. 16.Róna-Tas 1999, p. 209-213 & 230-231. 17.Engel 2001, p. 10. 18.Róna-Tas 1999, p. 105. 19.Csorba 1997, p. 32. 20.Engel 2001, p. 9-10. 21.Kristó 1996, p. 35. 22.Róna-Tas 1999, p. 323. 23.(en) Denis Sinor, « The outlines of Hungarian prehistory », International Commission for a History of the Scientific and Cultural Development of Mankind, vol. 4, no 3, 1958, p. 513-540 (lire en ligne [archive], consulté le 15 mars 2022) 24.Kristó 1996, p. 49-50. 25. Róna-Tas 1999, p. 328.

== Bibliography ==
- (hu) Csaba Csorba, Árpád Népe [“The People of Árpád”], Kulturtrade, 1997 (ISBN 963-9069-20-5)
- (en) Pál Engel, The Realm of St Stephen: A History of Medieval Hungary, 895-1526, I.B. Tauris Publishers, 2001 *(ISBN 1-86064-061-3, read online [archive])
- (en) István Fodor, In Search of a New Homeland: The Prehistory of the Hungarian People and the Conquest, Corvina Kiadó, 1975 (ISBN 963-13-1126-0)
- (en) Gyula Kristó, Hungarian History in the Ninth Century, Szegedi Középkorász Műhely, 1996 (ISBN 978-1-4039-6929-3) Document used for writing the article
- (en) C.A. Macartney, The Medieval Hungarian Historians: A Critical & Analytical Guide, Cambridge University Press, 1953 (ISBN 978-0-521-08051-4, read online [archive]) Document used for writing the article
- (en) András Róna-Tas, Hungarians and Europe in the Early Middle Ages: An Introduction to Early Hungarian History, CEU Press, 1999 (ISBN 978-963-9116-48-1, read online [archive])
