= Hungarian conquest of the Carpathian Basin =

9th and 10th century Hungarian campaign

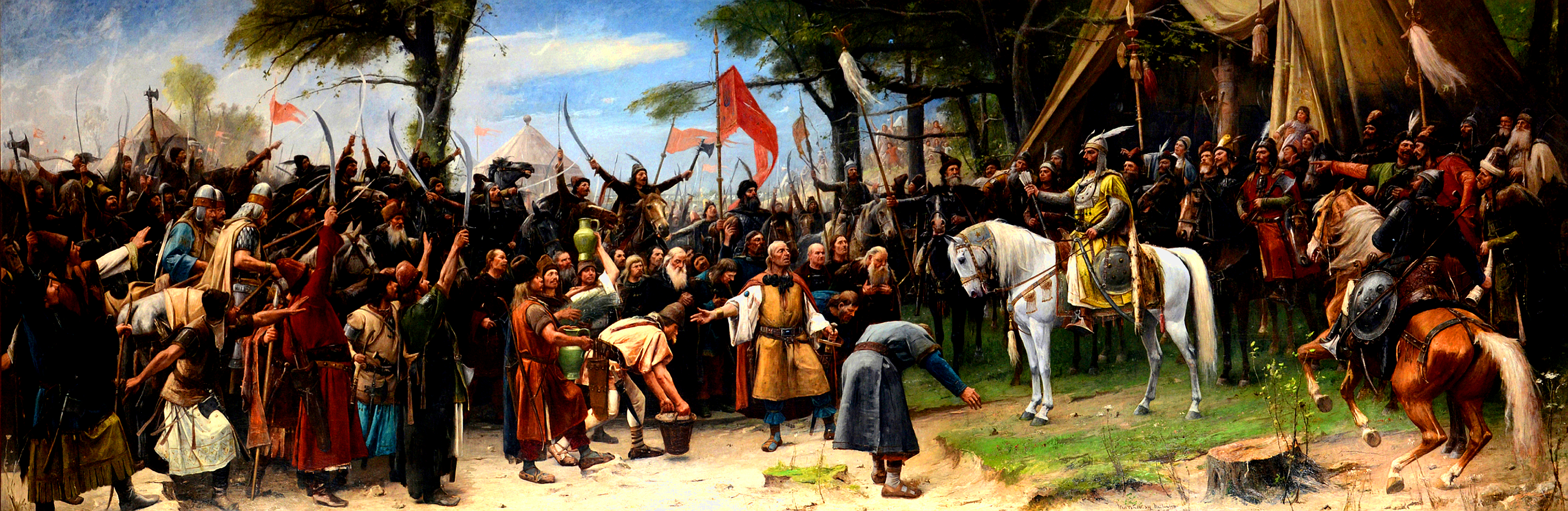
- Hungarian conquest (Mihály Munkácsy, 1893)
Date	862–895 (main phase), 900 (Transdanubia)
Location	Carpathian Basin
Result	Hungarian conquest and settlement of the Carpathian Basin, foundation of the Hungarian state, establishment of Grand Principality of Hungary; Hungarian invasions of Europe

Belligerents
Hungarian tribal confederation	First Bulgarian Empire; Pechenegs; Great Moravia; East Francia
- Allies: Byzantine Empire (894); Great Moravia (894); East Francia (899)

Commanders and leaders
Álmos; Árpád; Seven chieftains of the Magyars	Simeon I of Bulgaria; Svatopluk I of Moravia; Arnulf of Carinthia

The Hungarian conquest of the Carpathian Basin, also known as the Hungarian conquest or the Hungarian land-taking (Hungarian: honfoglalás, lit. 'taking/conquest of the homeland'), was a series of historical events ending with the settlement of the Hungarians in Central Europe in the late 9th and early 10th century. Before the arrival of the Hungarians, three early medieval powers, the First Bulgarian Empire, East Francia, and Moravia, competed for control of the Carpathian Basin following the collapse of the Avar Khaganate. They occasionally hired Hungarian horsemen as soldiers. Therefore, the Hungarians who dwelt on the Pontic-Caspian Steppe east of the Carpathian Mountains were familiar with what would become their homeland when their conquest started.

The Hungarian conquest started in the context of a "late or 'small' migration of peoples". The Hungarians took possession of the Carpathian Basin in a pre-planned manner, with a long move-in between 862–895. Other theories assert that the Hungarians crossed the Carpathian Mountains following a joint attack by the Pechenegs and Bulgarians in 894 or 895. They first took control over the lowlands east of the river Danube and attacked and occupied Pannonia (the region to the west of the river) in 900. They exploited internal conflicts in Moravia and annihilated that state sometime between 902 and 906.

The Hungarians secured their control over the Carpathian Basin by annihilating three attacking East Francian army at the Battle of Pressburg in 907. They launched a series of campaigns to Western Europe between 899 and 955 and also targeted the Byzantine Empire between 943 and 971. However, they gradually settled in the basin and established a Christian monarchy, the Kingdom of Hungary, around 1000.

== Background ==
=== Pre-conquest Hungarians ===
The Hungarians arrived in the Carpathian Basin, a geographically unified but politically divided land, after acquiring thorough local knowledge of the area from the 860s onwards. After the end of the Avar Khaganate (c. 822), the Bulgars asserted intermittent influence in Transylvania and parts of the Great Hungarian Plain, and the Eastern Franks and Moravians asserted intermittent influence in parts of Transdanubia, while the stateless Avar population remained dispersed across the basin. Archaeological evidence supports that Avars persisted in the Carpathian Basin into the period of the Hungarian conquest, and it is theorised that there was continuity between the Avars and conquering Hungarians. Due to the subsequent power vacuum that existed in the Carpathian Basin, the Hungarian conquering elite are believed to have been able to adopt surviving elements of the former Avar Khaganate’s system. There is no trace of massacres and mass graves, and it is believed to have been a peaceful transition for local residents in the Carpathian Basin. Other scholars dismiss the continuity between late Avar and Hungarian Conquerors and/or the "double-conquest" (kettős honfoglalás) of the Carpathian basin. According to historian Bálint Csanád, "Not one single element (of the original theory) is tenable" and that a "compelling piece of evidence is that a genuine similarity between the Avar- and Conquest-period skeletal material could only be demonstrated in 4.5% of the theoretically potential cases".

The Continuation of the Chronicle by George the Monk contains the earliest certain reference to the Hungarians. It states that Hungarian warriors intervened in a conflict between the Byzantine Empire and the Bulgarians on the latter's behalf in the Lower Danube region in 836 or 837. The first known Hungarian raid in Central Europe was recorded in the Annals of St. Bertin, which writes of "enemies, called Hungarians, hitherto unknown" who ravaged King Louis the German's realm in 862. Victor Spinei and other historians argue that Rastislav of Moravia, at war with Louis the German, hired Hungarians to invade East Francia. Archbishop Theotmar of Salzburg clearly states in his letter of around 900 that the Moravians often allied with the Hungarians against the Germans.

For many years [the Moravians] have in fact perpetrated the very crime of which they have only once falsely accused us. They themselves have taken in a large number of Hungarians and have shaved their own heads according to their heathen customs and they have sent them against our Christians, overcoming them, leading some away as captives, killing others, while still others, imprisoned, perished of hunger and thirst.

— Letter of Archbishop Theotmar of Salzburg and his suffragans to Pope John IX from around 900

Porphyrogenitus mentions that the Hungarians dwelled in a territory that they called "Atelkouzou" until their invasion across the Carpathians. He adds that it was located in the territory where the rivers Barouch, Koubou, Troullos, Broutos and Seretos run. Although the identification of the first two rivers with the Dnieper and the Southern Bug is not unanimously accepted, the last three names without doubt refer to the rivers Dniester, Prut and Siret. In the wider region, at Subotsi on the river Adiamka, three graves (one of them belonging to a male buried with the skull and legs of his horse) are attributed to pre-conquest Hungarians. However, these tombs may date to the 10th century.

The Hungarians were organized into seven tribes that formed a confederation. Constantine Porphyrogenitus mentions this number. Anonymous seems to have preserved the Hungarian "Hetumoger" ("Seven Hungarians") denomination of the tribal confederation, although he writes of "seven leading persons" jointly bearing this name instead of a political organization.

The Hetumoger confederation was strengthened by the arrival of the Kabars, who (according to Constantine) joined the Hungarians following their unsuccessful riot against the Khazar Khaganate. The Hungarians and the Kabars are mentioned in the longer version of the Annals of Salzburg, which relates that the Hungarians fought around Vienna, while the Kabars fought nearby at Culmite in 881. Madgearu proposes that Kavar groups were already settled in the Tisza plain within the Carpathian Basin around 881, which may have given rise to the anachronistic reference to Cumans in the Gesta Hungarorum at the time of the Hungarian conquest.

The Hetumoger confederation was under a dual leadership, according to Ibn Rusta and Gardizi (two Muslim scholars from the 10th and 11th centuries, respectively, whose geographical books preserved texts from an earlier work written by Abu Abdallah al-Jayhani from Bukhara). The Hungarians' nominal or sacred leader was styled kende, while their military commander bore the title gyula. The same authors add that the gyula commanded an army of 20,000 horsemen, but the reliability of this number is uncertain.

Regino of Prüm and other contemporary authors portray the 9th-century Hungarians as nomadic warriors. Emperor Leo the Wise underlines the importance of horses to their military tactics. Analysis of horse skulls found in Hungarian warriors graves has not revealed any significant difference between these horses and Western breeds. Regino of Prüm states that the Hungarians knew "nothing about fighting hand-to-hand in formation or taking besieged cities", but he underlines their archery skills. Remains indicate that composite bows were the Hungarians' most important weapons. In addition, slightly curved sabres were unearthed in many warrior tombs from the period. Regino of Prüm noted the Hungarians' preference for deceptions such as apparent retreat in battle. Contemporaneous writers also recounted their viciousness, represented by the slaughter of adult males in settlement raids.

[The Hungarians] are armed with swords, body armor, bows and lances. Thus, in battles most of them bear double arms, carrying the lances high on their shoulders and holding the bows in their hands. They make use of both as need requires, but when pursued they use their bows to great advantage. Not only do they wear armor themselves, but the horses of their illustrious men are covered in front with iron or quilted material. They devote a great deal of attention and training to archery on horse-back. A huge herd of horses, ponies and mares, follows them, to provide both food and milk and, at the same time, to give the impression of a multitude.

— Leo the Wise: Tactics

=== Inhabitants of the Carpathian Basin ===
Based on extant Hungarian chronicles, it is clear that more than one (occasionally extended) list existed of the peoples inhabiting the Carpathian Basin at the time of the Hungarian landtaking. Anonymus, for instance, first writes of the "Slavs, Bulgarians, Vlachs and the shepherds of the Romans" as inhabiting the territory, but later he refers to "a people called Kozar" and to the Székelys. Similarly, Simon of Kéza first lists the "Slavs, Greeks, Germans, Moravians and Vlachs", but later he adds that the Székelys also lived in the territory. According to Macartney, those lists were based on multiple sources and do not document the real ethnic conditions of the Carpathian Basin around 900. Ioan-Aurel Pop says that Simon of Kéza listed the peoples who inhabited the lands that the Hungarian conquered and the nearby territories.

The Hungarians adopted the ancient (Celtic, Dacian or Germanic) names of the longest rivers in the Carpathian Basin from a Slavic-speaking population. For instance, the Hungarian names of the rivers Danube (Duna), Dráva, Garam, Maros, Olt, Száva, Tisza and Vág were borrowed from Slavs. The Hungarians also adopted a great number of hydronyms of Slavic origin, including Balaton ("swamp"), Beszterce ("swift river"), Túr ("aurochs' stream") and Zagyva ("sooty river"). Place names of Slavic origin abound across the Carpathian Basin. For instance, Csongrád ("black fortress"), Nógrád ("new fortress"), Visegrád ("citadel") and other early medieval fortresses bore a Slavic name, while the name of Keszthely preserved the Latin word for fortress (castellum), with Slavic mediation.

Besides the Slavs, the presence of a German-speaking population can be demonstrated, based on toponyms. For example, the Hungarians adopted the Germanized form of the name of the river Vulka (whose name is of Slavic origin) and the document known as the Conversion of the Bavarians and the Carantanians from around 870 lists Germanic place names in Pannonia, including Salapiugin ("bend of the Zala") and Mosaburc ("fortress in the marshes"). The name of the Barca, Barót and other rivers could be either Turkic or Slavic in origin.

According to Béla Miklós Szőke's theory, the detailed description of the Magyars by western contemporary sources and the immediate Hungarian intervention in local wars suggest that the Hungarians had already lived on the eastern territories of the Carpathian Basin since the middle of the 9th century. Regarding the right location of early Hungarian settlements, the Arabic geographer al-Jayhani (only snippets of his work survived in other Muslim authors' papers) in the 870s placed the Hungarians between the Don and Danube rivers. Szőke identifies al-Jayhani's Danube with the middle Danube region, as opposed to the previously assumed lower Danube region because, following al-Jayhani's description, the Christian Moravians were the western neighbors of the Magyars.

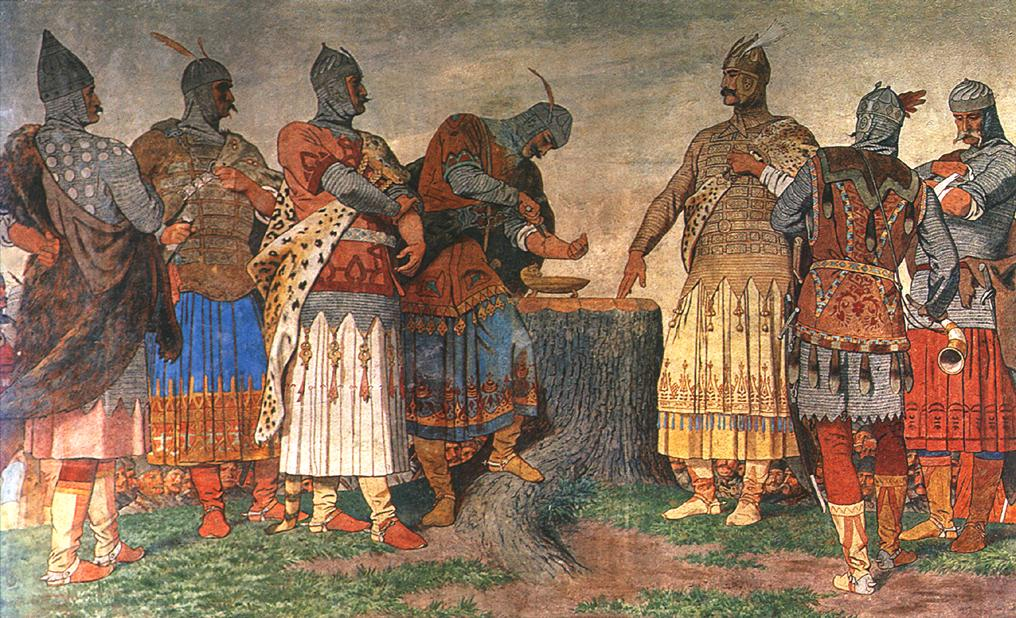
The blood oath in Etelköz, the Seven Hungarian chieftains establish an alliance under the leadership of Álmos (Bertalan Székely, 1896–1897)

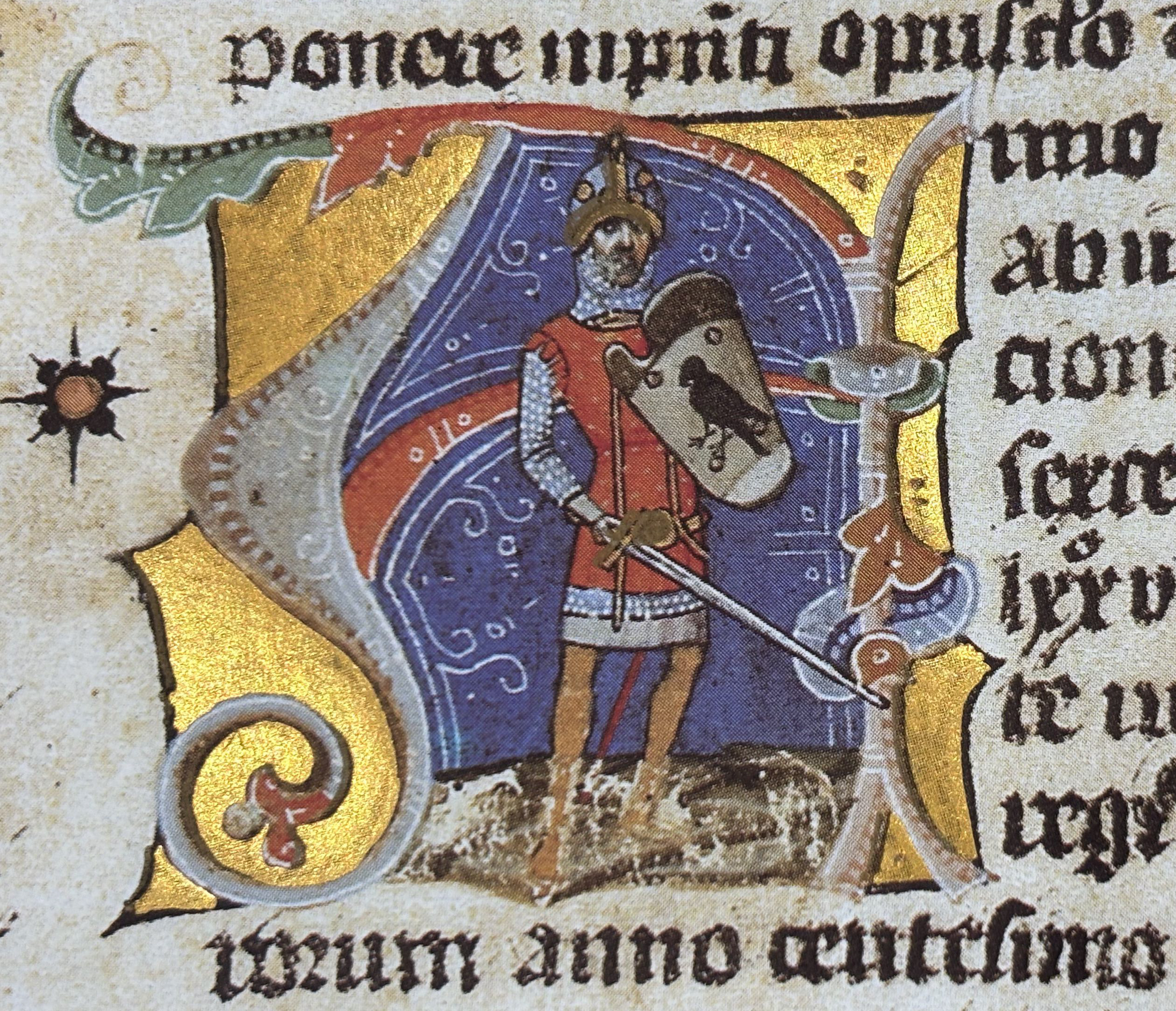
Grand Prince Álmos holding a shield bearing the Turul (Illuminated Chronicle, 1358)

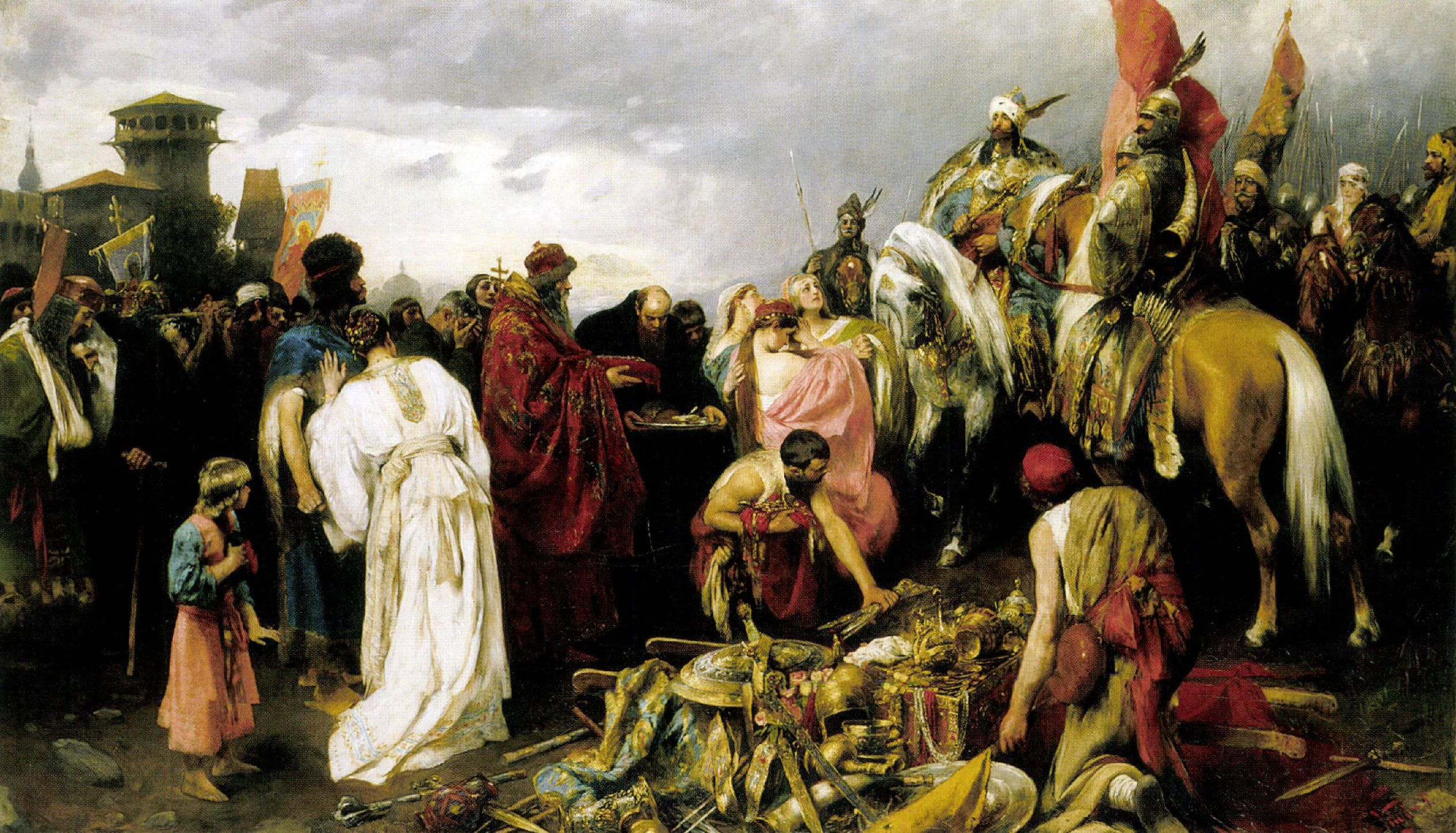
The Hungarians at Kiev (Pál Vágó, 1896–99)

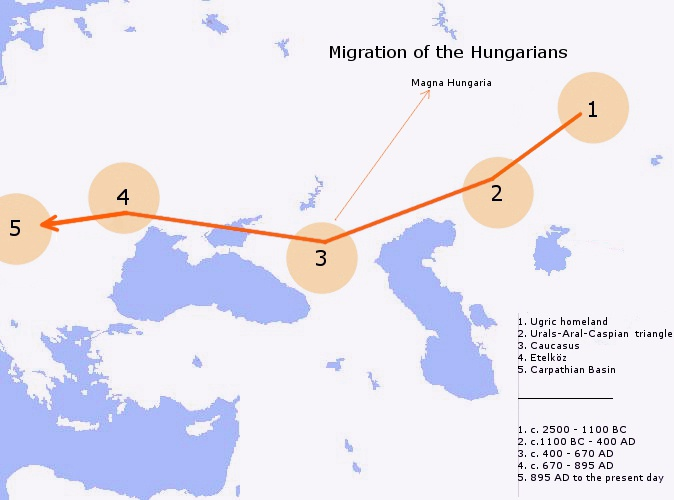
Map of the presumptive Hungarian prehistory

Europe around 814

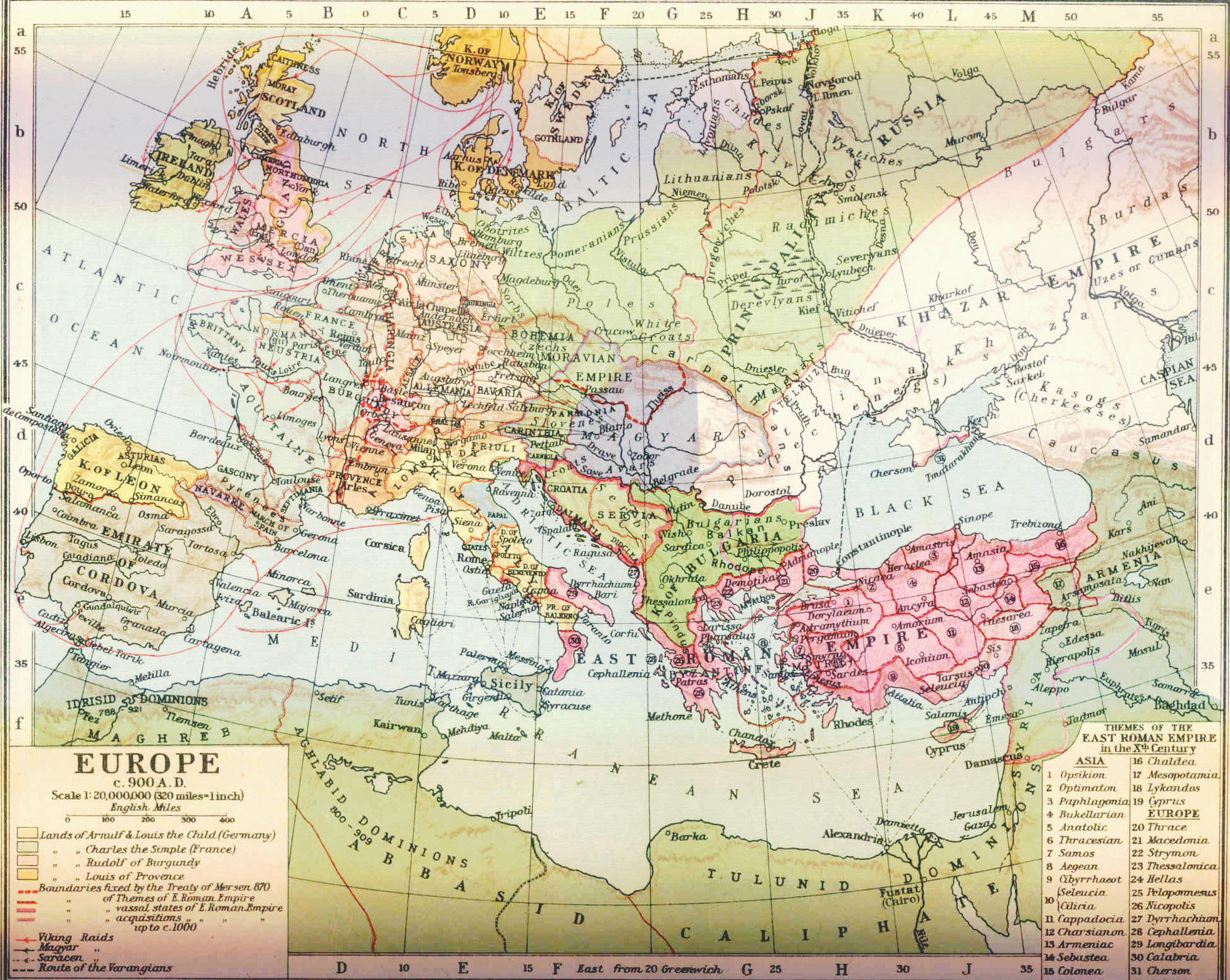
Europe around 900

The Hungarian land-taking

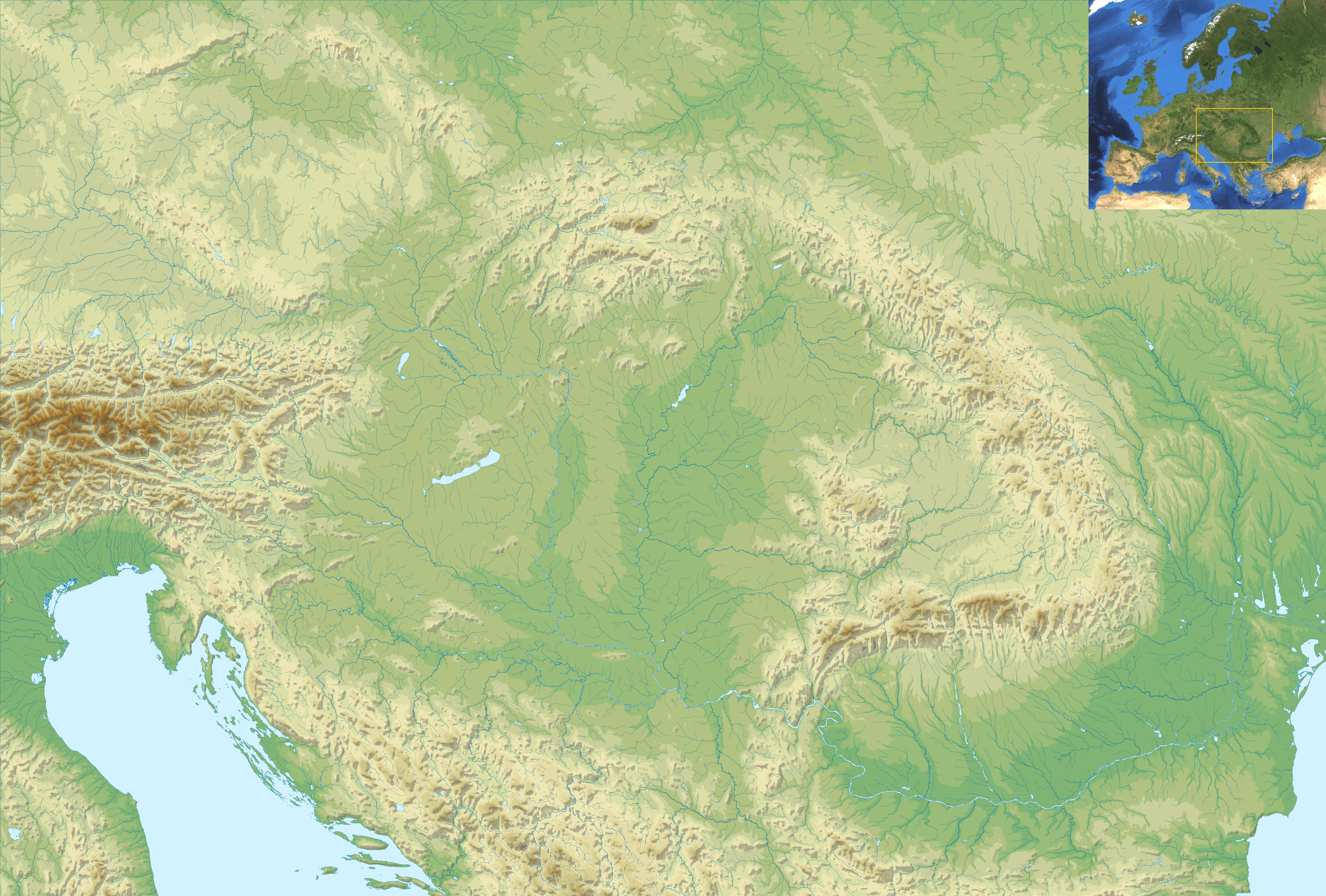
Carpathian and Pannonian Basin in Central Europe

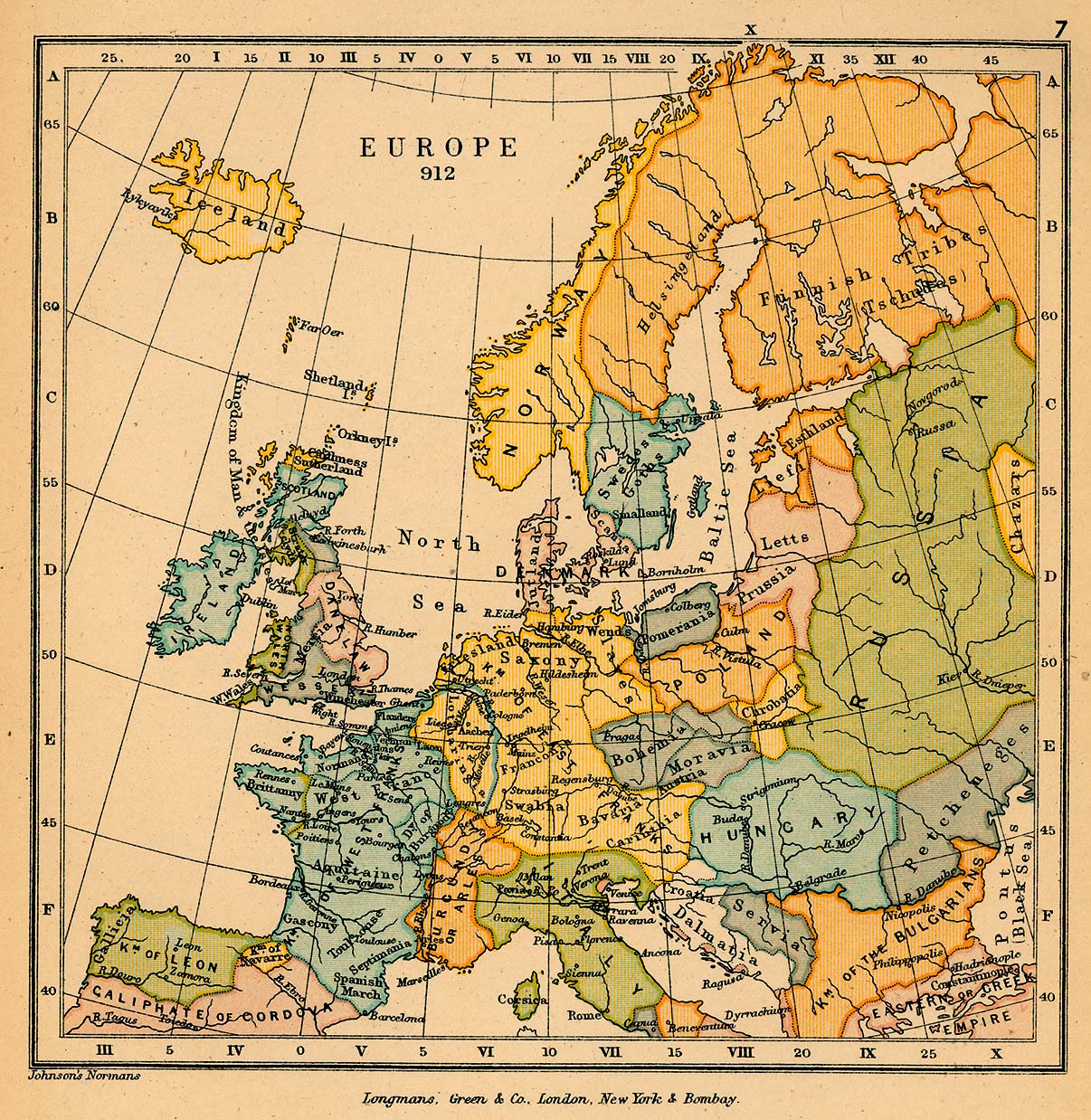
Europe in 912

=== Borderland of empires ===
The Carpathian Basin was controlled from the 560s by the Avars, a Turkic-speaking people. Upon their arrival in the region, they imposed their authority over the Gepids, who had dominated the territories east of the river Tisza. However, the Gepids survived up until the second half of the 9th century, according to a reference in the Conversion of the Bavarians and the Carantanians to their groups dwelling in Lower Pannonia around 870.

The Avars were initially nomadic horsemen, but both large cemeteries used by three or four generations and a growing number of settlements attest to their adoption of a sedentary (non-nomadic) way of life from the 8th century. The Avars' power was destroyed between 791 and 795 by Charlemagne, who occupied Transdanubia and attached it to his empire. Archaeological investigation of early medieval rural settlements at Balatonmagyaród, Nemeskér and other places in Transdanubia demonstrate that their main features did not change with the fall of the Avar Khaganate. New settlements appeared in the former borderlands with cemeteries characterised by objects with clear analogues in contemporary Bavaria, Bulgaria, Croatia, Moravia and other distant territories. A manor defended by timber walls (similar to noble courts of other parts of the Carolingian Empire) was unearthed at Zalaszabar.

Avar groups who remained under the rule of their khagan were frequently attacked by Slav warriors. Therefore, the khagan asked Charlemagne to let his people settle in the region between Szombathely and Petronell in Pannonia. His petition was accepted in 805. The Conversion of the Bavarians and the Carantanians lists the Avars among the peoples under the ecclesiastic jurisdiction of the Roman Catholic Archdiocese of Salzburg around 870. According to Pohl, it "simply proved impossible to keep up an Avar identity after Avar institutions and the high claims of their tradition had failed." The growing number of archaeological evidence in Transdanubia also presumes Avar population in the Carpathian Basin at the eve of the 10th century. Archaeological findings suggesting that there is a substantial late Avar presence on the Great Hungarian Plain, but it is difficult to determine the proper chronology.

A charter issued in 860 by King Louis the German for the Mattsee Abbey may well attest that the Onogurs (another people of Turkic origin) were also present in the territory. The charter refers to the "Marches of the Wangars" (marcha uuangariourum) situated in the westernmost regions of the Carpathian Basin. The Wangar denomination seems to reflect the Slavic form of the Onogurs' ethnonym.

The territories attached to the Frankish Empire were initially governed by royal officers and local chieftains. A Slavic prince named Pribina received large estates along the river Zala around 840. He promoted the colonisation of his lands and also erected Mosaburg, a fortress in the marshes. Initially defended by timber walls, this "castle complex" (András Róna-Tas) became an administrative center. It was strengthened by drystone walls at the end of the century. Four churches surrounded by cemeteries were unearthed in and around the settlement. At least one of them continued to be used up to the 11th century.

Pribina died fighting the Moravians in 861, and his son Kocel inherited his estates. Kocel was succeeded around 876 by Arnulf, a natural son of Carloman, king of East Francia. Under his rule, Moravian troops interved into the conflict known as the "Wilhelminer War" and "laid waste from the Raab eastward" between 882 and 884, according to the Annals of Fulda.

Moravia emerged in the 820s under its first known ruler, Mojmir I. His successor, Rastislav, developed Moravia's military strength. He promoted the proselytizing activities of the Byzantine brothers, Constantine and Methodius in an attempt to seek independence from East Francia. Moravia reached its "peak of importance" under Svatopluk I who expanded its frontiers in all directions.

Moravia's core territory is located in the regions on the northern Morava river, in the territory of the present-day Czech Republic and Slovakia. However, Constantine Porphyrogenitus places "great Moravia, the unbaptized" somewhere in the regions beyond Belgrade and Sirmium (Sremska Mitrovica, Serbia). His report supported further theories on Moravia's location. For instance, Kristó and Senga propose the existence of two Moravias (one in the north and other one in the south), while Boba, Bowlus and Eggers argue that Moravia's core territory is in the region of the southern Morava river, in present-day Serbia. The existence of a southern Moravian realm is not supported by artifacts, while strongholds unearthed at Mikulčice, Pohansko and other areas to the north of the middle Danube point at the existence of a power center in those regions.

In addition to East Francia and Moravia, the First Bulgarian Empire was also deeply involved in the Carpathian Basin in the 9th century. A late 10th-century Byzantine lexicon known as Suda adds that Krum of Bulgaria attacked the Avars from the southeast around 803. The Royal Frankish Annals narrates that the Abodrites inhabiting "Dacia on the Danube", most probably along the lower courses of the river Tisza, sought the assistance of the Franks against the Bulgars in 824. Bulgarian troops also invaded Pannonia, "expelled the Slavic chieftains and appointed Bulgar governors instead" in 827. An inscription at Provadia refers to a Bulgarian military leader named Onegavonais drowning in the Tisza around the same time. The emerging power of Moravia brought about a rapprochement between Bulgaria and East Francia in the 860s. King Arnulf of East Francia sent an embassy to the Bulgarians in 892 in order "to renew the former peace and to ask that they should not sell salt to the Moravians". The latter request suggests that the route from the salt mines of the eastern Carpathians to Moravia was controlled around that time by the Bulgarians.

The anonymous author of the Gesta Hungarorum, instead of Svatopluk I of Moravia and other rulers known from contemporary sources, writes of personalities and polities that are not mentioned by chroniclers working at the end of the 9th century. For instance, he refers to Menumorut residing in the castle of Bihar (Biharia, Romania), to Zobor "duke of Nitra by the grace of the Duke of the Czechs", and to Gelou "a certain Vlach" ruling over Transylvania. According to historian Ryszard Grzesik, the reference to Gelou and his Vlachs evidences that the Vlachs had already settled in Transylvania by the time the Gesta was completed, while the stories about Zobor and Menumorut preserved the memory of the Hungarians' fight against the Moravians. Translating Menumorut's name as "Great Moravian", Grzesik associates him with Svatopluk I and refutes the report of Menumorut's rule in Bihar. Early medieval fortresses were unearthed at Bihar and other places east of the Tisza, but none of them definitively date to the 9th century. In the case of Doboka (Dăbâca), two pairs of bell-shaped pendants with analogues in sites in Austria, Bulgaria and Poland have been unearthed, but Florin Curta dates them to the 9th century, while Alexandru Madgearu to the period between 975 and 1050.

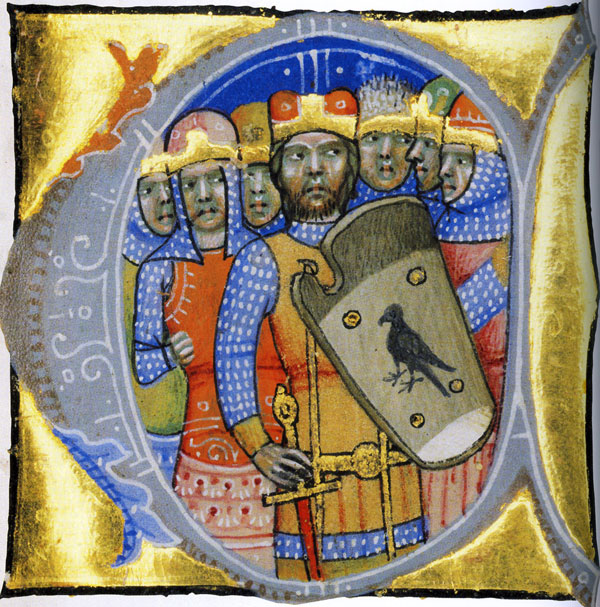
Grand Prince Árpád and the heads of the seven Hungarian tribes (Illuminated Chronicle, 1358)

The Hungarians' arrival in the Carpathian Basin (Illuminated Chronicle, 1358)

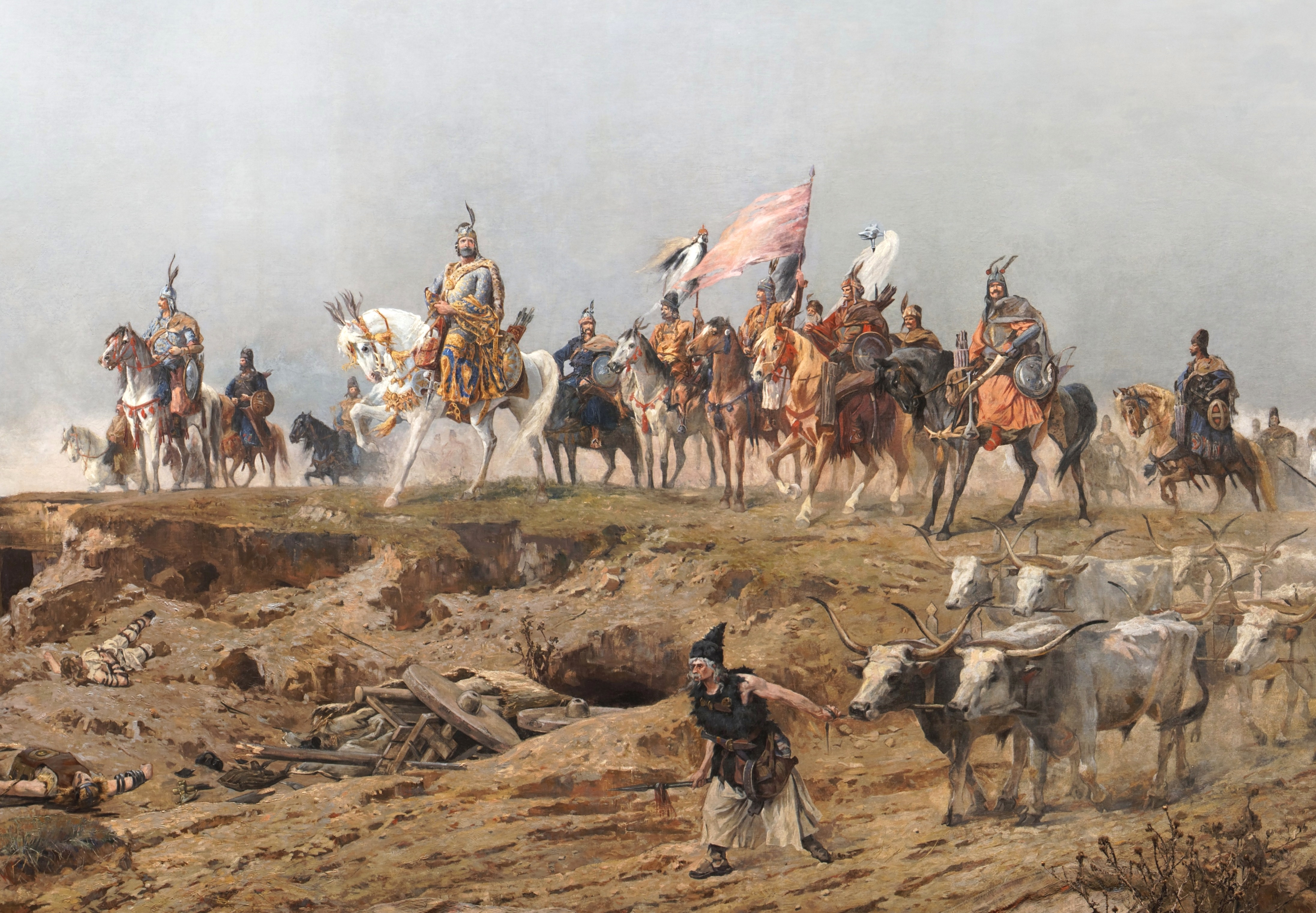
The seven chieftains of the Hungarians, a detail of the Feszty Panorama (Árpád Feszty, 1894)

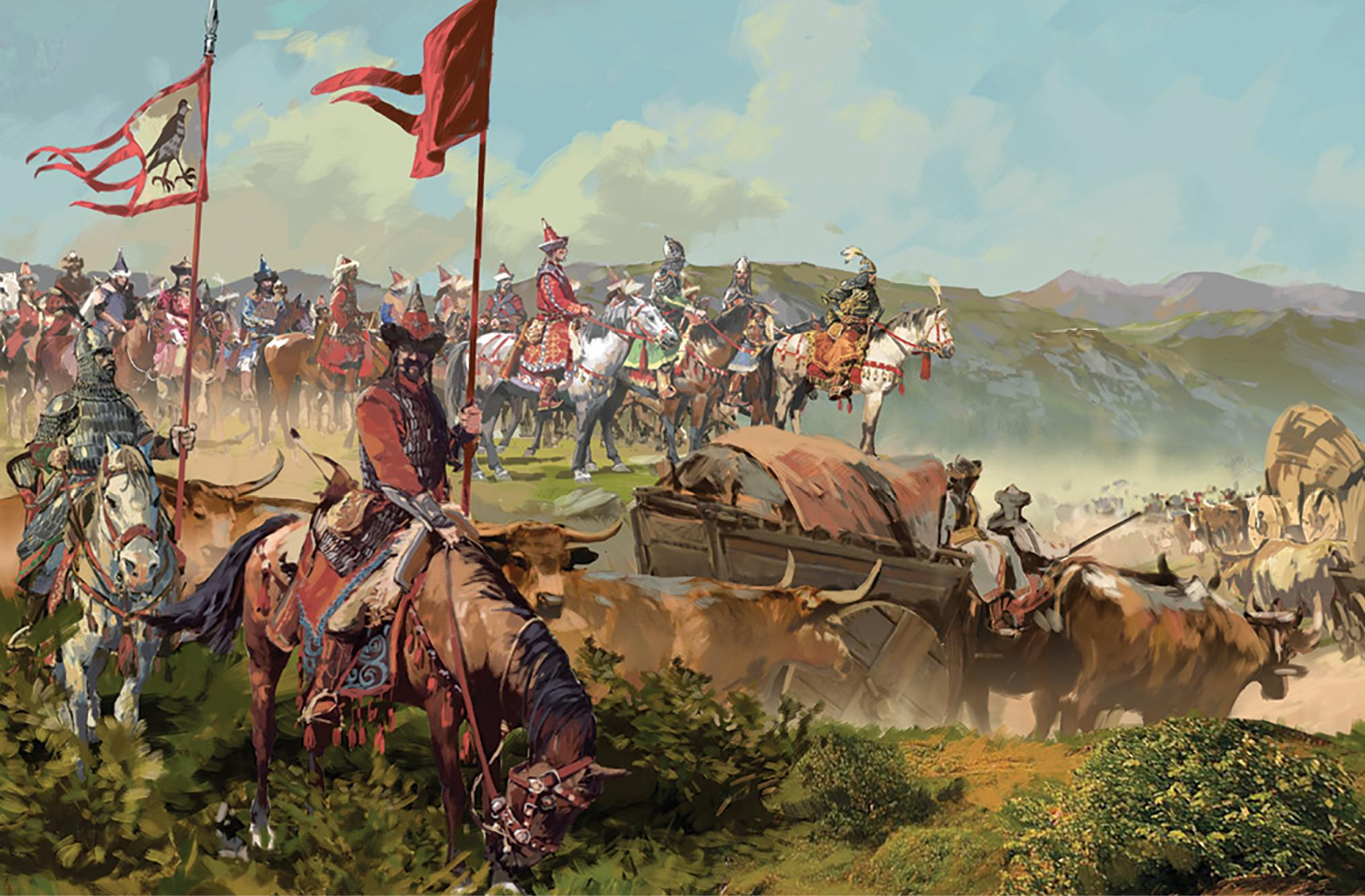
Hungarian Conquest of the Carpathian Basin

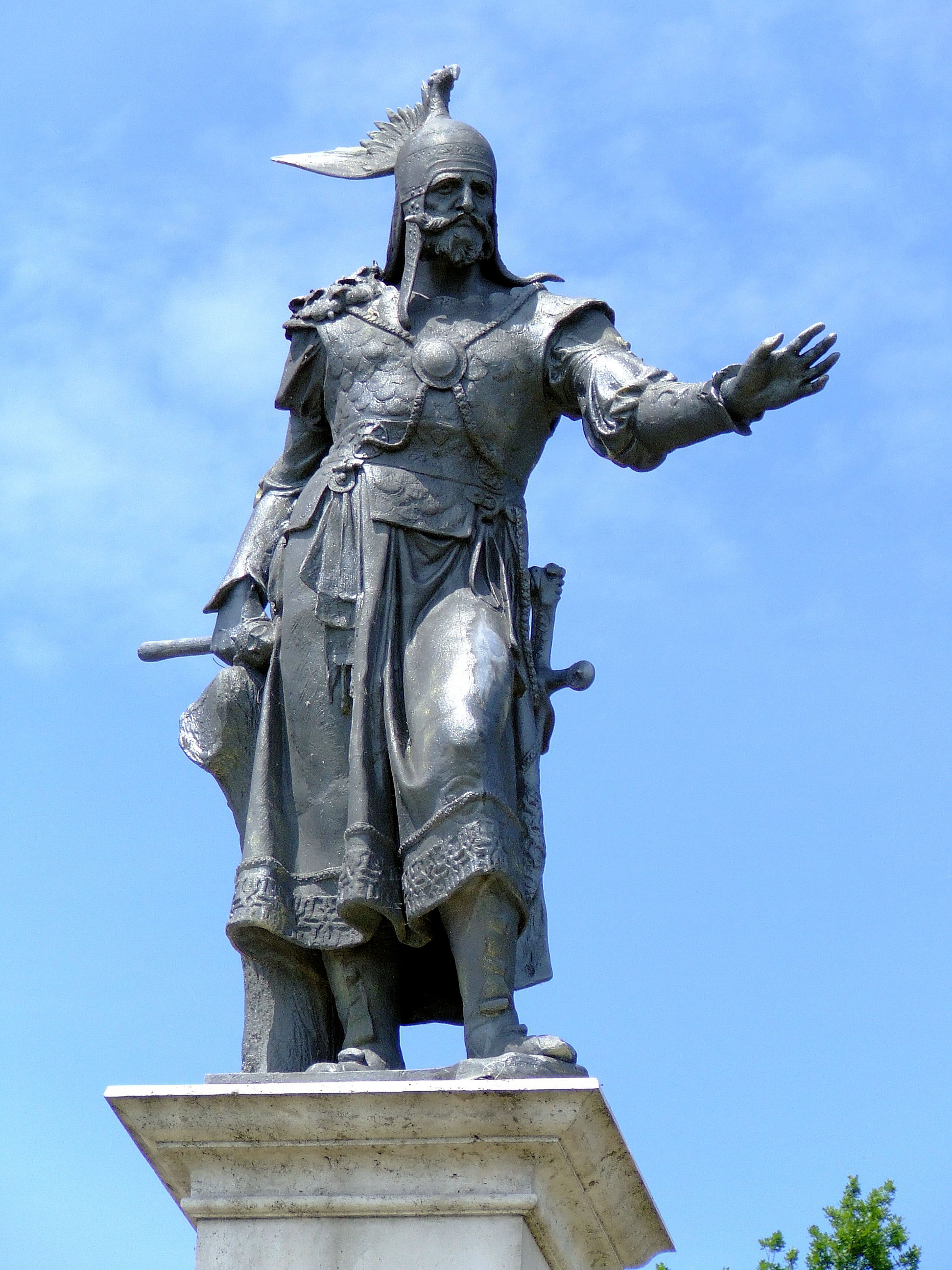
Statue of Árpád at Ráckeve

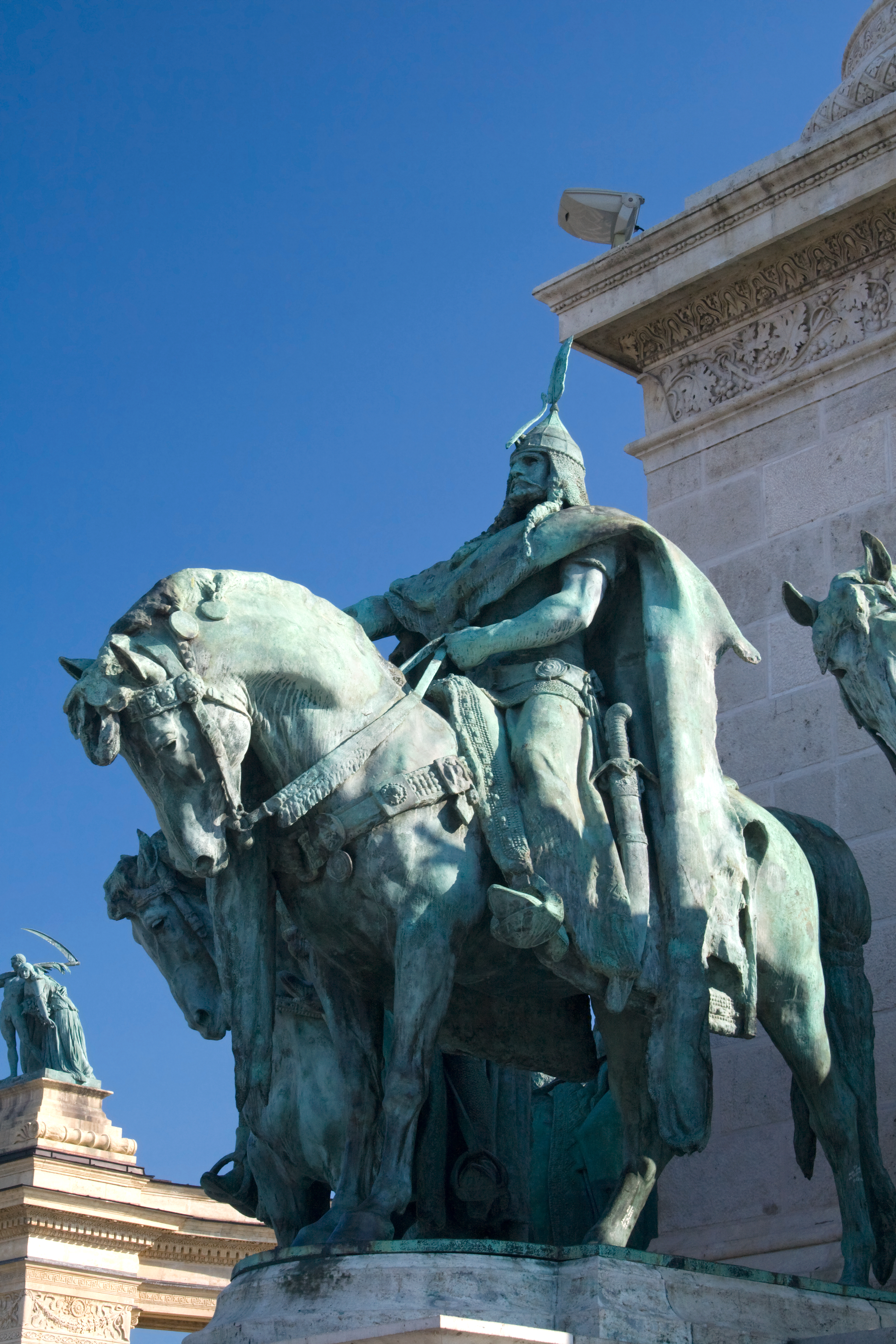
Statue of Árpád at the Heroes' Square in Budapest

== Conquest ==
=== Prelude (862–895) ===
Three main theories attempt to explain the reasons for the "Hungarian land-taking". One argues that it was an intended military operation, prearranged following previous raids, with the express purpose of occupying a new homeland. This view (expounded, for example, by Bakay and Padányi) mainly follows the narration of Anonymus and later Hungarian chronicles. The opposite view maintains that a joint attack by the Pechenegs and the Bulgarians forced the Hungarians' hand. Kristó, Tóth and the theory's other adherents refer to the unanimous testimony provided by the Annals of Fulda, Regino of Prüm and Porphyrogenitus on the connection between the Hungarians' conflict with the Bulgar-Pecheneg coalition and their withdrawal from the Pontic steppes. An intermediate theory proposes that the Hungarians had for decades been considering a westward move when the Bulgarian-Pecheneg attack accelerated their decision to leave the Pontic-Caspian steppe. For instance Róna-Tas argues, "[the] fact that, despite a series of unfortunate events, the Magyars managed to keep their heads above water goes to show that they were indeed ready to move on" when the Pechenegs attacked them.

In fact, following a break of eleven years, the Hungarians returned to the Carpathian Basin in 892. They came to assist Arnulf of East Francia against Svatopluk I of Moravia. Widukind of Corvey and Liutprand of Cremona condemned the Frankish monarch for destroying the defense lines built along the empire's borders, because this also enabled the Hungarians to attack East Francia within a decade.

Meanwhile Arnulf…could not overcome Sviatopolk, duke of the Moravians…and – alas! – having dismantled those very well fortified barriers which…are called "closures" by the populace. Arnulf summoned to his aid the nation of the Hungarians, greedy, rash, ignorant of almighty God but well versed in every crime, avid only for murder and plunder.

— Liutprand of Cremona: Retribution

A late source, Aventinus adds that Kurszán (Cusala), "king of the Hungarians" stipulated that his people would only fight the Moravians if they received the lands they were to occupy. Accordingly, Aventinus continues, the Hungarians took possession of "both Dacias on this side and beyond" the Tisza east of the rivers Danube and Garam already in 893. Indeed, the Hungarian chronicles unanimously state that the Székelys had already been present in the Carpathian Basin when the Hungarians moved in. Kristó argues that Aventinus and the Hungarian historical tradition together point to an early occupation of the eastern territories of the Carpathian Basin by auxiliary troops of the Hungarian tribal confederation.

The Annals of Fulda narrated in 894 that the Hungarians crossed the Danube into Pannonia where they "killed men and old women outright and carried off the young women alone with them like cattle to satisfy their lusts and reduced the whole" province "to desert". Although the annalist writes of this Hungarian attack after the passage narrating Svatopluk I's death, Györffy, Kristó, Róna-Tas and other historians suppose that the Hungarians invaded Pannonia in alliance with the Moravian monarch. They argue that the "Legend of the White Horse" in the Hungarian chronicles preserved the memory of a treaty the Hungarians had made with Svatopluk I according to pagan customs. The legend narrates that the Hungarians purchased their future homeland in the Carpathian Basin from Svatopluk for a white horse harnessed with gilded saddle and reins.

Then [Kusid] came to the leader of the region who reigned after Attila and whose name was Zuatapolug, and saluted him in the name of his people [...]. On hearing this, Zuatapolug rejoiced greatly, for he thought that they were peasant people who would come and till his land; and so he dismissed the messenger graciously. [...] Then by a common resolve [the Hungarians] despatched the same messenger again to the said leader and sent to him for his land a big horse with a golden saddle adorned with the gold of Arabia and a golden bridle. Seeing it, the leader rejoiced all the more, thinking that they were sending gifts of homage in return for land. When therefore the messenger asked of him land, grass and water, he replied with a smile, "In return for the gift let them have as much as they desire." ...Then [the Hungarians] sent another messenger to the leader and this was the message which he delivered: "Arpad and his people say to you that you may no longer stay upon the land which they bought of you, for with the horse they bought your earth, with the bridle the grass, and with the saddle the water. And you, in your need and avarice, made to them a grant of land, grass and water." When this message was delivered to the leader, he said with a smile: "Let them kill the horse with a wooden mallet, and throw the bridle on the field, and throw the golden saddle into the water of the Danube." To which the messenger replied: "And what loss will that be to them, lord? If you kill the horse, you will give food for their dogs; if you throw the bridle on the field, their men will find the gold of the bridle when they mow the hay; if you throw the saddle into the Danube, their fishermen will lay out the gold of the saddle upon the bank and carry it home. If they have earth, grass and water, they have all."

— Illuminated Chronicle

Ismail Ibn Ahmed, the emir of Khorasan, raided "the land of the Turks" (the Karluks) in 893. Later he caused a new movement of peoples who one by one invaded the lands of their western neighbors in the Eurasian Steppe. Al-Masudi clearly connects the westward movement of the Pechenegs and the Hungarians to previous fights between the Karluks, Ouzes and Kimeks. Porphyrogenitus writes of a joint attack by the Khazars and Ouzes that compelled the Pechenegs to cross the Volga River sometime between 893 and 902 (most probably around 894).

Originally, the Pechenegs had their dwelling on the river [Volga] and likewise on the river [Ural] (…). But fifty years ago the so-called Uzes made common cause with the Chazars and joined battle with the Pechenegs and prevailed over them and expelled them from their country (…).

— Constantine Porphyrogenitus: De Administrando Imperio

The relationship between Bulgaria and the Byzantine Empire sharpened in 894, because Emperor Leo the Wise forced the Bulgarian merchants to leave Constantinople and settle in Thessaloniki. Subsequently, Tzar Simeon I of Bulgaria invaded Byzantine territories and defeated a small imperial troop. The Byzantines approached the Hungarians to hire them to fight the Bulgarians. Nicetas Sclerus, the Byzantine envoy, concluded a treaty with their leaders, Árpád and Kurszán (Kusan), and Byzantine ships transferred Hungarian warriors across the Lower Danube. The Hungarians invaded Bulgaria, forced Tzar Simeon to flee to the fortress of Dristra (now Silistra, Bulgaria) and plundered Preslav. An interpolation in Porphyrogenitus's work states that the Hungarians had a prince named "Liountikas, son of Arpad" at that time, which suggests that he was the commander of the army, but he might have been mentioned in the war context by chance.

Simultaneously with the Hungarian attack from the north, the Byzantines invaded Bulgaria from the south. Tzar Simeon sent envoys to the Byzantine Empire to propose a truce. At the same time, he sent an embassy to the Pechenegs to incite them against the Hungarians. He succeeded, and the Pechenegs broke into Hungarian territories from the east, forcing the Hungarian warriors to withdraw from Bulgaria. The Bulgarians, according to Constantine Porphyrogenitus, attacked and routed the Hungarians.

The Pechenegs destroyed the Hungarians' dwelling places. Those who survived the double attack left the Pontic steppes and crossed the Carpathians in search of a new homeland. The memory of the destruction brought by the Pechenegs seems to have been preserved by the Hungarians. The Hungarian name of the Pechenegs (besenyő) corresponds to the old Hungarian word for eagle (bese). Thus the 14th-century Hungarian chronicles' story of eagles compelling the Hungarians' ancestors to cross the Carpathians most probably refers to the Pechenegs' attack.

The Hungarians were (…) driven from their home (…) by a neighboring people called the Petchenegs, because they were superior to them in strength and number and because (…) their own country was not sufficient to accommodate their swelling numbers. After they had been forced to flee by the violence of the Petchenegs, they said goodbye to their homeland and set out to look for lands where they could live and establish settlements.

— Regino of Prüm: Chronicle

[At] the invitation of Leo, the Christ-loving and glorious emperor [the Hungarians] crossed over and fought Symeon and totally defeated him, (…) and they went back to their own county. (…) But after Symeon (…) sent to the Pechenegs and made an agreement with them to attack and destroy [the Hungarians] And when [the latter] had gone off on a military expedition, the Pechenegs with Symeon came against [them] and completely destroyed their families and miserably expelled thence [those] who were guarding their country. When [the Hungarians] came back and found their country thus desolate and utterly ruined, they settled in the land where they live today (…).

— Constantine Porphyrogenitus: De Administrando Imperio

Passing through the kingdom of the Bessi and the Cumani Albi and Susdalia and the city named Kyo, they crossed the mountains and came into a region where they saw innumerable eagles; and because of the eagles they could not stay in that place, for the eagles came down from the trees like flies and devoured both their herds and their horses. For God intended that they should go down more quickly into Hungary. During three months they made their descent from the mountains, and they came to the boundaries of the kingdom of Hungary, that is to Erdelw [...].

— Illuminated Chronicle

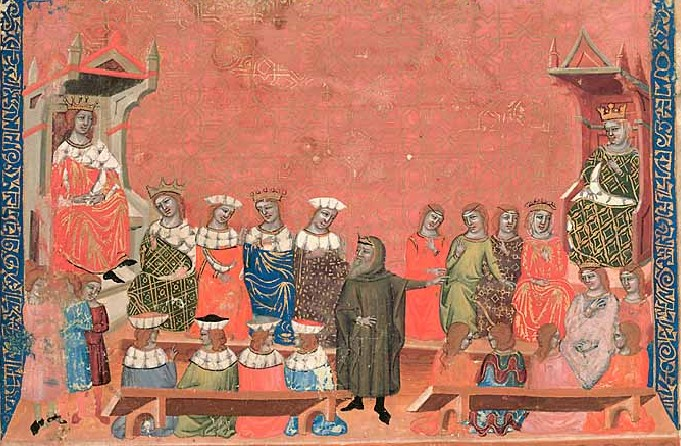
Svatopluk I of Moravia disguised as a monk in Arnulf of East Francia's court in the Chronicle of Dalimil

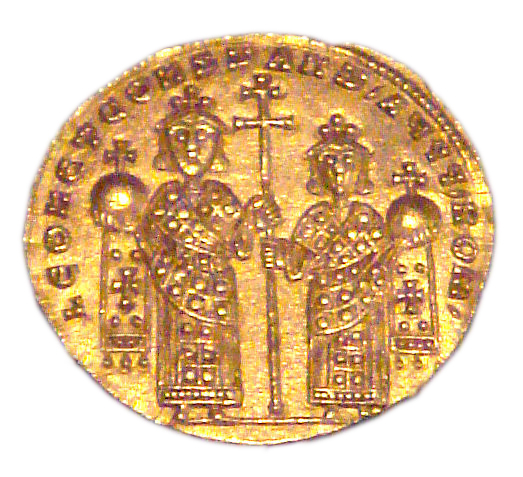
Leo the Wise and his son, Constantine Porphyrogenitus on a Byzantine golden solidus

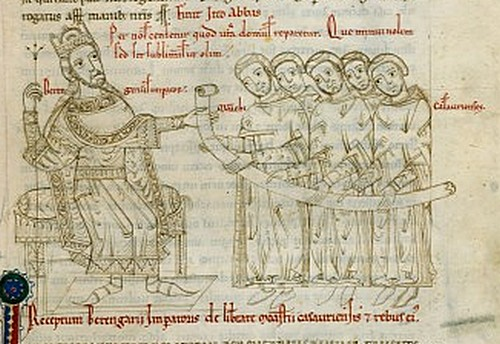
Berengar I of Italy

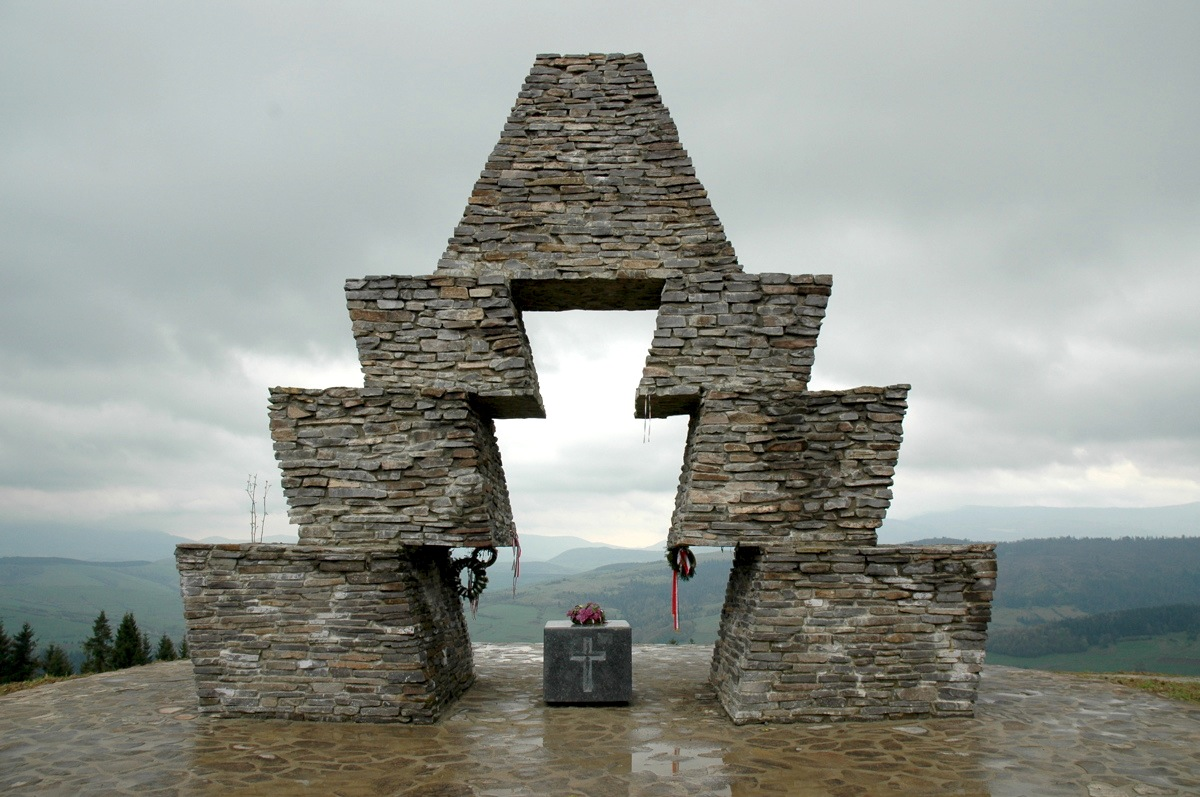
Memorial of the 1100th anniversary of the Hungarian conquest of the Carpathian Basin in the Verecke Pass (Péter Matl, 1996)

=== First phase (c. 895–899) ===
The date of the Hungarian invasion varies according to the source. The earliest date (677) is preserved in the 14th-century versions of the "Hungarian Chronicle", while Anonymus gives the latest date (902). Contemporaneous sources suggest that the invasion followed the 894 Bulgarian-Byzantine war. The route taken across the Carpathians is also contested. Anonymus and Simon of Kéza have the invading Hungarians crossing the northeastern passes, while the Illuminated Chronicle writes of their arrival in Transylvania. Regino of Prüm states that the Hungarians "roamed the wildernesses of the Pannonians and the Avars and sought their daily food by hunting and fishing" following their arrival in the Carpathian Basin. Their advance towards the Danube seems to have stimulated Arnulf, who was crowned emperor to entrust Braslav (the ruler of the region between the rivers Drava and Sava) with the defense of all Pannonia in 896. In 897 or 898 a civil war broke out between Mojmir II and Svatopluk II (two sons of the late Moravian ruler, Svatopluk I), in which Emperor Arnulf also intervened. There is no mention of the Hungarians' activities in those years.

The next event recorded in connection with the Hungarians is their raid against Italy in 899 and 900. The letter of Archbishop Theotmar of Salzburg and his suffragans suggests that Emperor Arnulf incited them to attack King Berengar I of Italy. They routed the Italian troops on 2 September at the river Brenta in a great battle and plundered the region of Vercelli and Modena in the winter, but the doge of Venice, Pietro Tribuno, defeated them at Venice on 29 June 900. They returned from Italy when they learned of the death of Emperor Arnulf at the end of 899.

According to Anonymous, the Hungarians fought with Menumorut before conquering Gelou's Transylvania. Subsequently, the Hungarians turned against Salan, the ruler of the central territories, according to this narrative. In contrast with Anonymus, Simon of Kéza writes of the Hungarians' fight with Svatopluk following their arrival. According to the Illuminated Chronicle, the Hungarians "remained quietly in Erdelw and rested their herds" there after their crossing because of an attack by eagles.

The Hungarian chronicles preserved two separate lists of the Hungarians' leaders at the time of the conquest. Anonymus mentions Álmos, Előd, Künd, Ónd, Tas, Huba and Tétény, while Simon of Kéza and the Illuminated Chronicle list Árpád, Szabolcs, Gyula, Örs, Künd, Lél and Vérbulcsú. Contemporaneous or nearly contemporaneous sources make mention of Álmos (Constantine Porphyrogenitus), of Árpád (Continuation of the Chronicle by George the Monk and Constantine Porphyrogenitus), of Liountikas (Constantine Porphyrogenitus) and of Kurszán (Continuation of the Chronicle by George the Monk).

According to the Illuminated Chronicle, Álmos, Árpád's father "could not enter Pannonia, for he was killed in Erdély". The episode implies that Álmos was the kende, the sacred ruler of the Hungarians, at the time of their destruction by the Pechenegs, which caused his sacrifice. If his death was in fact the consequence of a ritual murder, his fate was similar to that of the Khazar khagans who were executed, according to Ibn Fadlan and al-Masudi, in the case of disasters affecting their whole people.

=== Second phase (900–902) ===
The death of Arnulf released the Hungarians from their alliance with East Francia. On their way back from Italy they expanded their rule over Pannonia. According to Liutprand of Cremona, the Hungarians "claimed for themselves the nation of the Moravians, which King Arnulf had subdued with the aid of their might" at the coronation of Arnulf's son, Louis the Child in 900. The Annals of Grado relates that the Hungarians defeated the Moravians after their withdrawal from Italy. Thereafter the Hungarians and the Moravians made an alliance and jointly invaded Bavaria, according to Aventinus. However, the contemporary Annals of Fulda only refers to Hungarians reaching the river Enns.

One of the Hungarian contingents crossed the Danube and plundered the territories on the river's north bank, but Luitpold, Margrave of Bavaria gathered troops and routed them between Passau and Krems an der Donau on 20 November 900. He had a strong fortress erected against them on the Enns. Nevertheless, the Hungarians became the masters of the Carpathian Basin by the occupation of Pannonia. The Primary Chronicle may also reflect the memory of this event when relating how the Hungarians expelled the "Volokhi" or "Volkhi" who had earlier subjugated the Slavs' homeland in Pannonia, according to scholars who identify the Volokhi and Volkhi as Franks. Other historians associate them either with Vlachs (Romanians), or with ancient Romans.

Over a long period the Slavs settled beside the Danube, where the Hungarian and Bulgarian lands now lie. From among these Slavs, parties scattered throughout the country and were known by appropriate names, according to the places where they settled. (...) [T]he [Volkhi] attacked the Danubian Slavs, settled among them, and did them violence... The Magyars passed by Kyiv over the hill now called Hungarian and on arriving at the Dnipro, they pitched camp. They were nomads like the Polovcians. Coming out of the east, they struggled across the great mountains and began to fight against the neighboring [Volokhi] and Slavs. For the Slavs had settled there first, but the [Volokhi] had seized the territory of the Slavs. The Magyars subsequently expelled the [Volkhi], took their land and settled among the Slavs, whom they reduced to submission. From that time this territory was called Hungarian.

— Primary Chronicle 5.23–25; 6.6–8; 25.10–21.

King Louis the Child held a meeting at Regensburg in 901 to introduce further measures against the Hungarians. Moravian envoys proposed peace between Moravia and East Francia, because the Hungarians had in the meantime plundered their country. A Hungarian army invading Carinthia was defeated in April 901, and Aventinus describes a defeat of the Hungarians by Margrave Luitpold at the river Fischa in the same year.

The Annals of Fulda mentions multiple devastating raids done by the Hungarians in the territory of Moravia such as Staré Město and Nitra.

=== Consolidation (902–907) ===
The date when Moravia ceased to exist is uncertain, because there is no clear evidence either of the "existence of Moravia as a state" after 902 (Spinei) or of its fall. A short note in the Annales Alamannici refers to a "war with the Hungarians in Moravia" in 902, during which the "land (patria) succumbed", but this text is ambiguous. Alternatively, the so-called Raffelstetten Customs Regulations mentions the "markets of the Moravians" around 905. The Life of Saint Naum relates that the Hungarians occupied Moravia, adding that the Moravians who "were not captured by the Hungarians, ran to the Bulgars". Constantine Porphyrogenitus also connects the fall of Moravia to its occupation by the Hungarians. The destruction of the early medieval urban centers and fortresses at Szepestamásfalva (Spišské Tomášovce), Dévény and other places in modern Slovakia is dated to the period around 900.

After the death of (...) [Svatopluk I, his sons] remained at peace for a year and then strife and rebellion fell upon them and they made a civil war against one another and the [Hungarians] came and utterly ruined them and possessed their country, in which even now [the Hungarians] live. And those of the folk who were left were scattered and fled for refuge to the adjacent nations, to the Bulgarians and [Hungarians] and Croats and to the rest of the nations.

— Constantine Porphyrogenitus: De Administrando Imperio

According to Anonymus, who does not write of Moravia, the Hungarians invaded the region of Nyitra (Nitra, Slovakia) and defeated and killed Zobor, the local Czech ruler, on Mount Zobor near his seat. Thereafter, as Anonymus continues, the Hungarians first occupied Pannonia from the "Romans" and next battled with Glad and his army, which was composed of Bulgarians, Vlachs and Pechenegs from Banat. Glad ceded few towns from his duchy. Finally, Anonymus writes of a treaty between the Hungarians and Menumorut, stipulating that the local ruler's daughter was to be given in marriage to Árpád's son, Zolta. Macartney argues that Anonymus's narration of both Menumorut and of Glad is basically a transcription of a much later report of the early 11th-century Achtum, Glad's alleged descendant. In contrast, for instance, Madgearu maintains that Galad, Kladova, Gladeš and other place names recorded in Banat in the 14th century and 16th century attest to the memory of a local ruler named Glad.

[The Hungarians] reached the region of Bega, and stayed there for two weeks while they conquered all the inhabitants of that land from the Mures to the Timis River and they received their sons as hostages. Then, moving the army on, they came to the Timis River and encamped beside the ford of Foeni and when they sought to cross the Timis's flow, there came to oppose them Glad, (...) the prince of that country, with a great army of horsemen and foot soldiers, supported by Cumans, Bulgarians and Vlachs. (...) God with His grace went before the Hungarians, He gave them a great victory and their enemies fell before them as bundles of hay before reapers. In that battle two dukes of the Cumans and three kneses of the Bulgarians were slain and Glad, their duke escaped in flight but all his army, melting like wax before flame, was destroyed at the point of the sword. (...) Prince Glad, having fled, as we said above, for fear of the Hungarians, entered the castle of Kovin. (...) [He] sent to seek peace with [the Hungarians] and of his own will delivered up the castle with diverse gifts.

— Anonymous: Gesta Hungarorum

An important event following the conquest of the Carpathian Basin, the Bavarians' murder of Kurszán, was recorded by the longer version of the Annals of Saint Gall, the Annales Alamannici and the Annals of Einsiedeln. The first places the event in 902, while the others date it to 904. The three chronicles unanimously state that the Bavarians invited the Hungarian leader to a dinner on the pretext of negotiating a peace treaty and treacherously assassinated him. Kristó and other Hungarian historians argue that the dual leadership over the Hungarians ended with Kurszán's death.

The Hungarians invaded Italy using the so-called "Route of the Hungarians" (Strada Ungarorum), leading from Pannonia to Lombardy, in 904. They arrived as King Berengar I's allies against his rival, King Louis of Provence. The Hungarians devastated the territories occupied earlier by King Louis along the river Po, which ensured Berengar's victory. The victorious monarch allowed the Hungarians to pillage all the towns that had earlier accepted his opponent's rule, and agreed to pay a yearly tribute of about 375 kilograms (827 lb) of silver.

The longer version of the Annals of Saint Gall reports that Archbishop Theotmar of Salzburg fell, along with Bishops Uto of Freising and Zachary of Säben, in a "disastrous battle" fought against the Hungarians at Brezalauspurc on 4 July 907. Other contemporary sources add that Margrave Luitpold of Bavaria and 19 Bavarian counts also died in the battle. Most historians (including Engel, Makkai, and Spinei) identify Brezalauspurc with Pressburg (Bratislava, Slovakia), but some researchers (for instance Boba and Bowlus) argue that it can refer to Mosaburg, Braslav's fortress on the Zala in Pannonia. The Hungarians' victory hindered any attempts of eastward expansion by East Francia for the following decades and opened the way for the Hungarians to freely plunder vast territories of that kingdom.

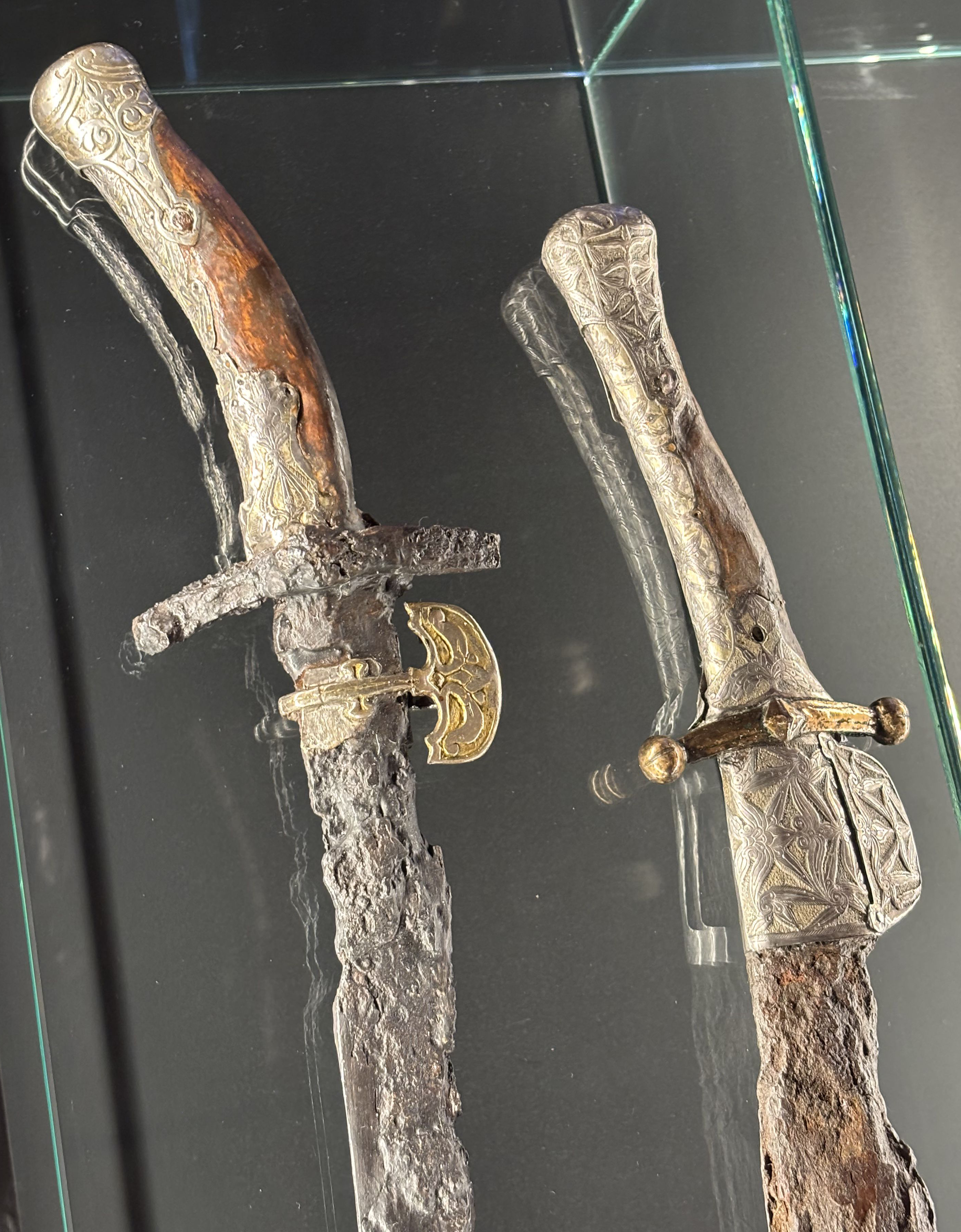
Hungarian sabers from the Hungarian conquest period (10th century)

Hungarian sabretache plates from the Hungarian conquest period (10th-century)

Hungarian gilded silver hair braid discs from the Hungarian conquest period (10th-century)

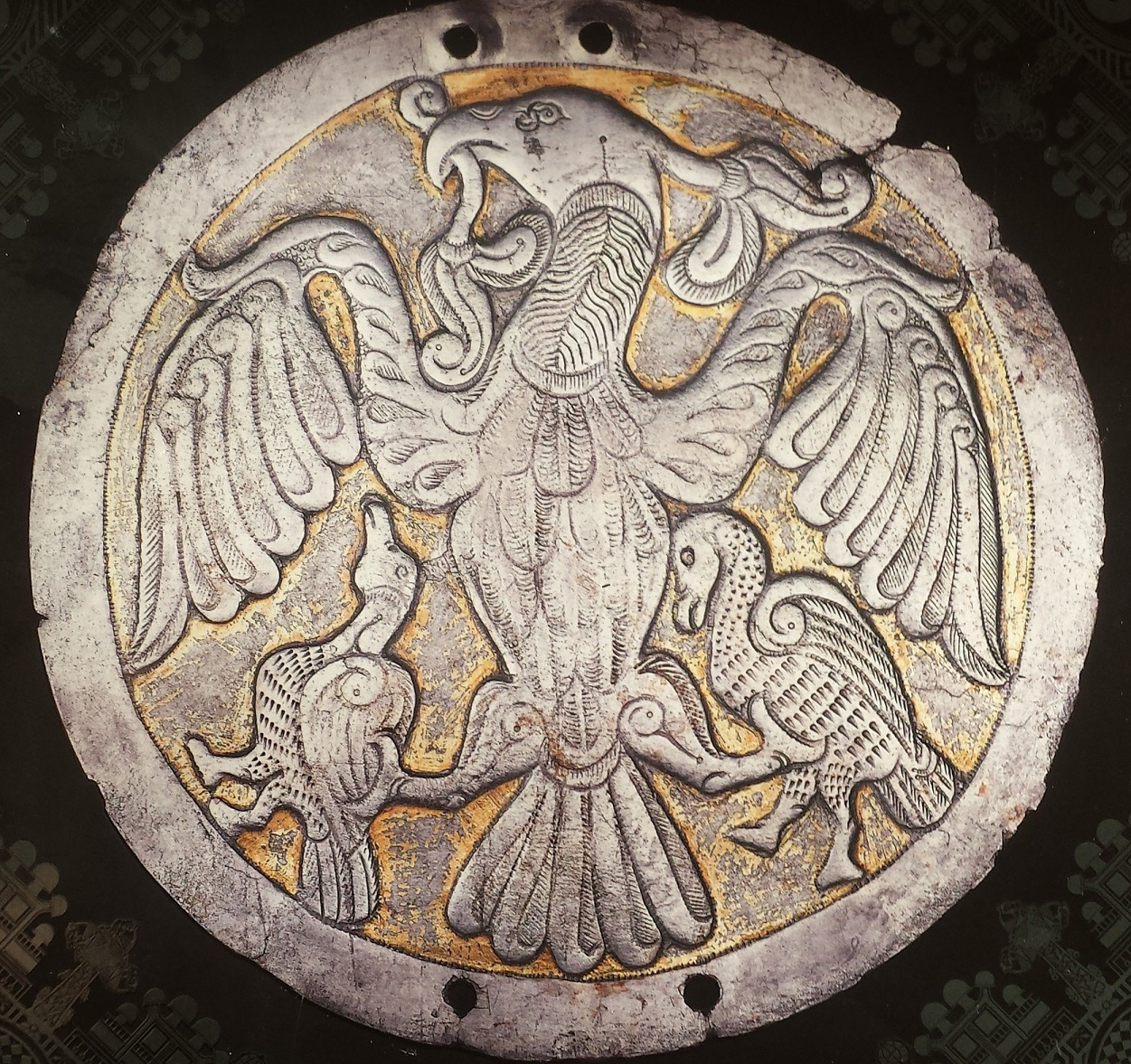
Gilt silver hair braid disc with motive of mythic Turul bird (10th-century)

== Consequences ==
The Hungarians settled in the lowlands of the Carpathian Basin along the rivers Danube, Tisza and their tributaries, where they could continue their semi-nomadic lifestyle. As an immediate consequence, their arrival "drove a non-Slavic wedge between the West Slavs and South Slavs." Fine argues that the Hungarians' departure from the western regions of the Pontic steppes weakened their former allies, the Khazars, which contributed to the collapse of the Khazar Empire.

Hungarian society experienced fundamental changes in many fields (including animal husbandry, agriculture and religion) in the centuries following the "land-taking". These changes are reflected in the significant number of terms borrowed from local Slavs. About 20% of the Hungarian vocabulary is of Slavic origin, including the Hungarian words for sheep-pen (akol), yoke (iga) and horseshoe (patkó). Similarly, the Hungarian name of vegetables, fruits and other cultivated plants, as well as many Hungarian terms connected to agriculture are Slavic loanwords, including káposzta ("cabbage"), szilva ("plum"), zab ("oats"), széna ("hay") and kasza ("scythe").

The Hungarians left wide marches (the so-called gyepű) in the borderlands of their new homeland uninhabited for defensive purposes. In this easternmost territory of the Carpathian Basin, the earliest graves attributed to Hungarian warriors—for instance, at Sic, Turda and Ocna Sibiului—are concentrated around the Transylvanian salt mines in the valley of the rivers Someșul Mic and Mureș. All the same, warriors were also stationed in outposts east of the Carpathians, as suggested by 10th-century graves unearthed at Krylos, Przemyśl, Sudova Vyshnia, Grozești, Probota and Tei. The Hungarians' fear of their eastern neighbors, the Pechenegs, is demonstrated by Porphyrogenitus's report on the failure of a Byzantine envoy to persuade them to attack the Pechenegs. The Hungarians clearly stated that they could not fight against the Pechenegs because "their people are numerous and they are the devil's brats".

Instead of attacking the Pechenegs and the Bulgarians in the east, the Hungarians made several raids into Western Europe. For instance, they plundered Thuringia and Saxony in 908, Bavaria and Swabia in 909 and 910 and Swabia, Lorraine and West Francia in 912. Although a Byzantine hagiography of Saint George refers to a joint attack of Pechenegs, "Moesians" and Hungarians against the Byzantine Empire in 917, its reliability is not established. The Hungarians seem to have raided the Byzantine Empire for the first time in 943. However, their defeat in the Battle of Lechfeld in 955 "put an end to the raids in the West" (Kontler), while they stopped plundering the Byzantines following their defeat in the Battle of Arkadiopolis in 970.

The Hungarian leaders decided that their traditional lifestyle, partly based on plundering raids against sedentary peoples, could not be continued. The defeats at the Lechfeld and Arkadiopolis accelerated the Hungarians' adoption of a sedentary way of life. This process culminated in the coronation of the head of the Hungarians, Stephen, as the first king of Hungary in 1000 and 1001.

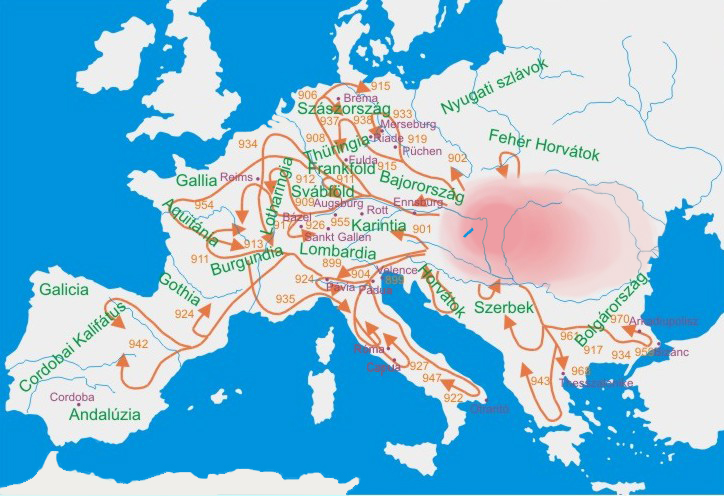
Map of Hungarian campaigns in Europe during the 9th and 10th centuries

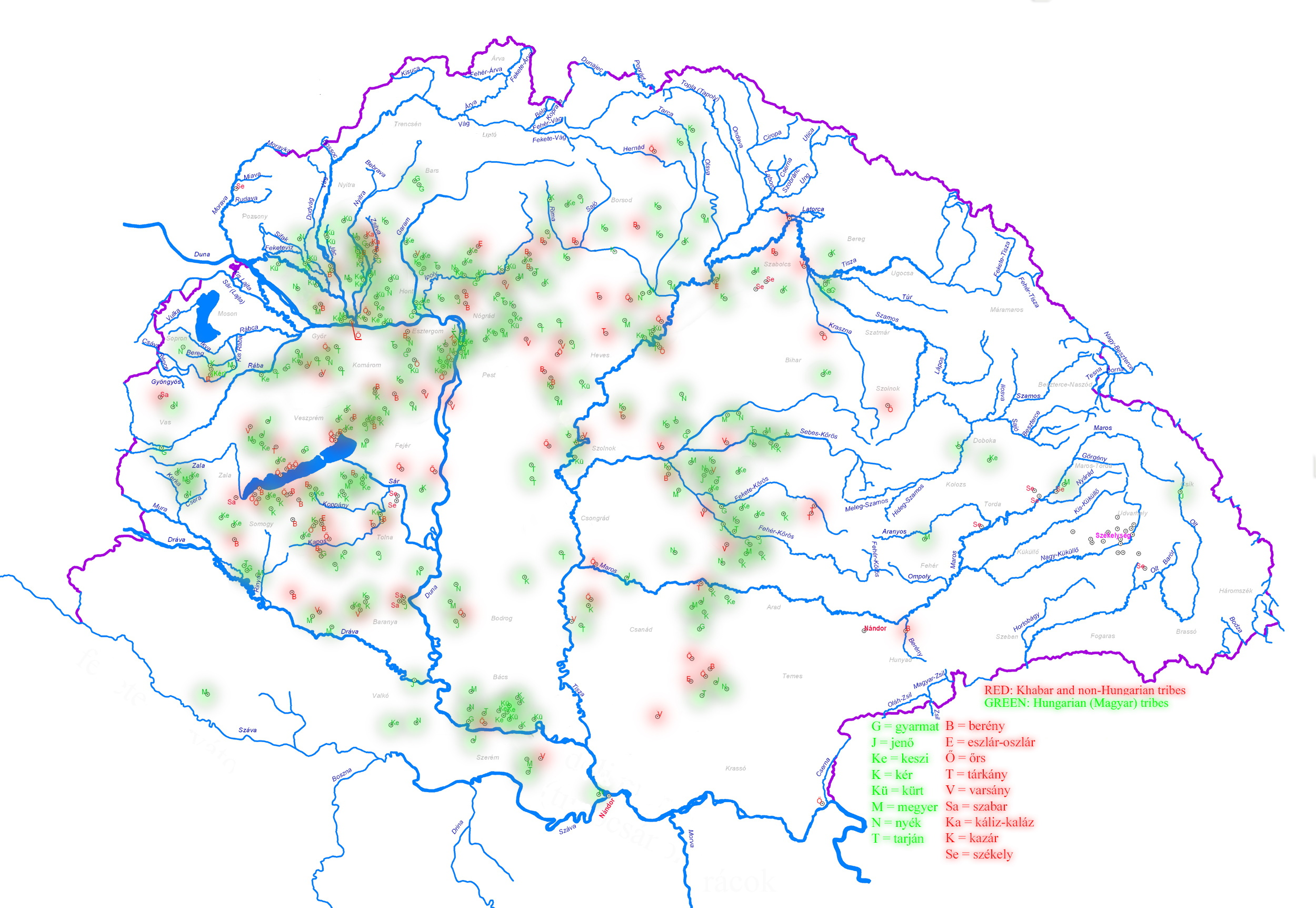
Settlements bearing the name of a Hungarian tribe in the Carpathian Basin (after Sándor Török). They may point at the places where the Hungarians lived amongst other peoples and help in reconstructing where the tribes settled.

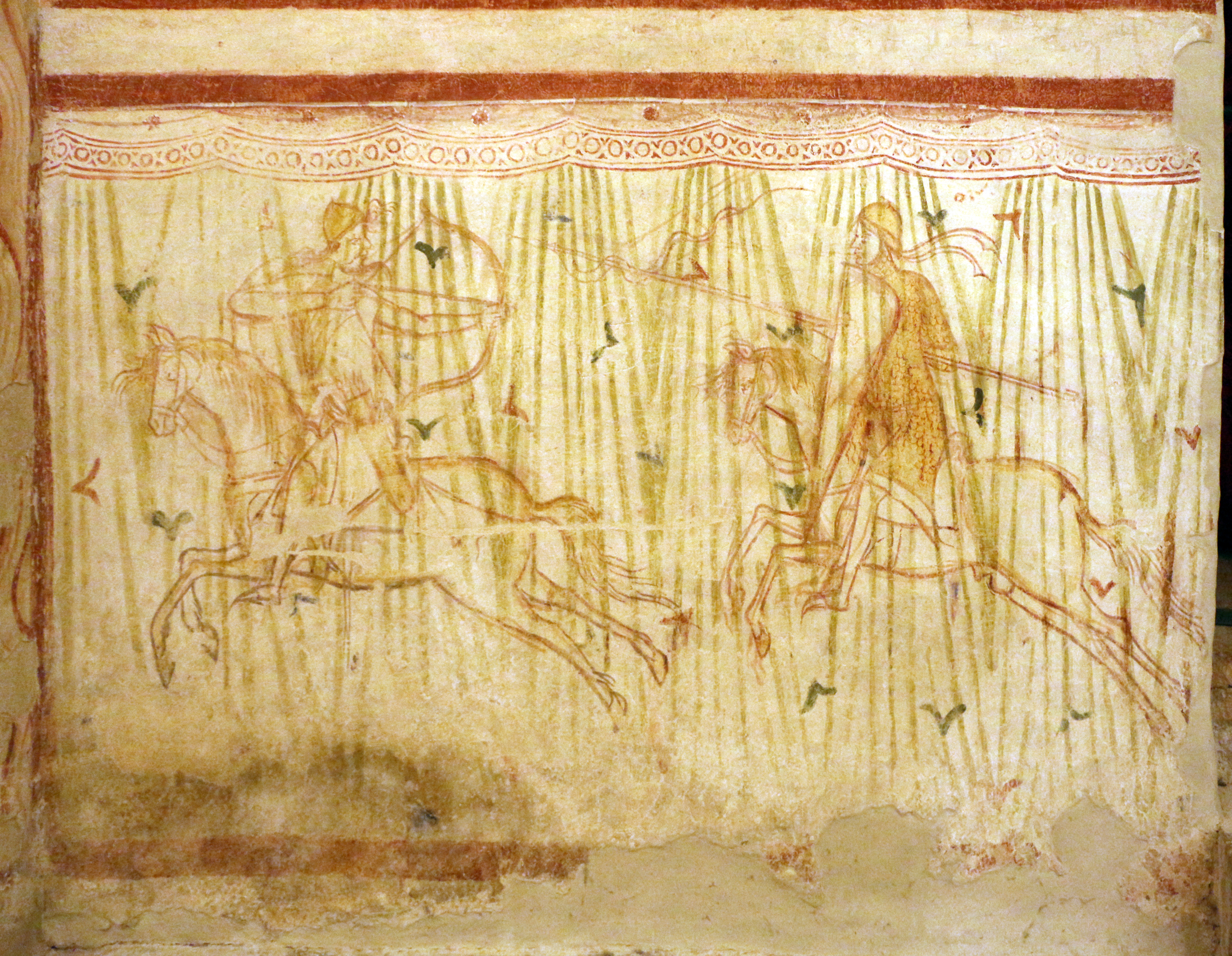
Fresco depicting a Hungarian warrior in the Basilica of Aquilieia, Italy. "We ask you, even though we are your humble servants, Lord save us from the arrows of the Hungarians!" Hymn from Modena, around 900

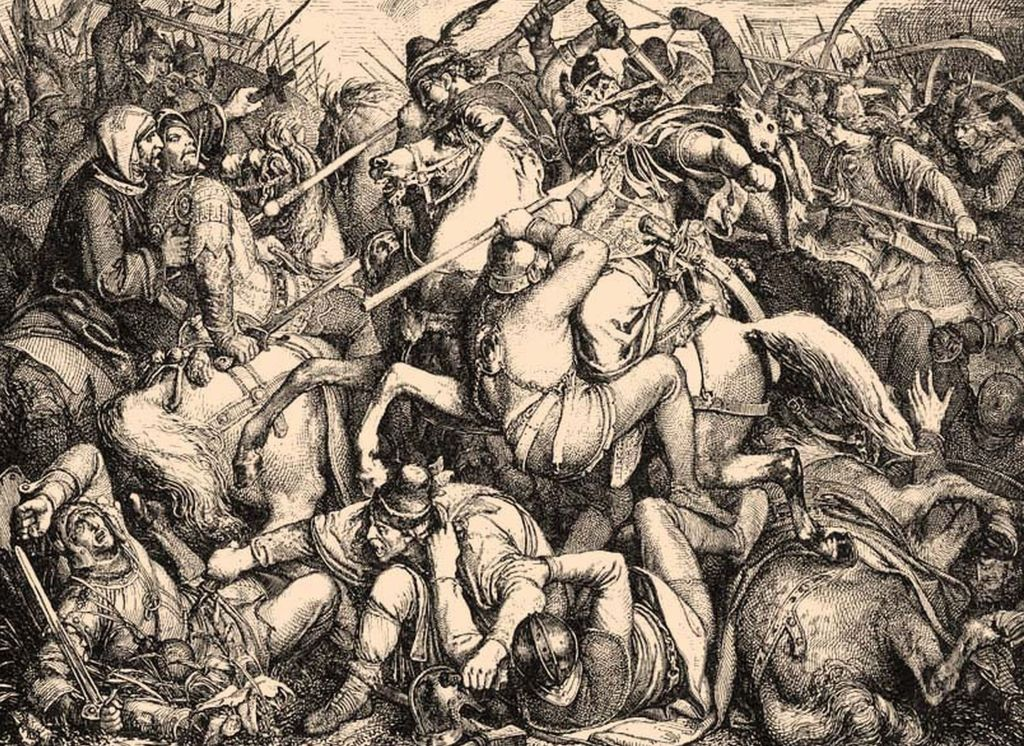
Battle of Pressburg in 907 (Peter Johann Nepomuk Geiger, 1850)

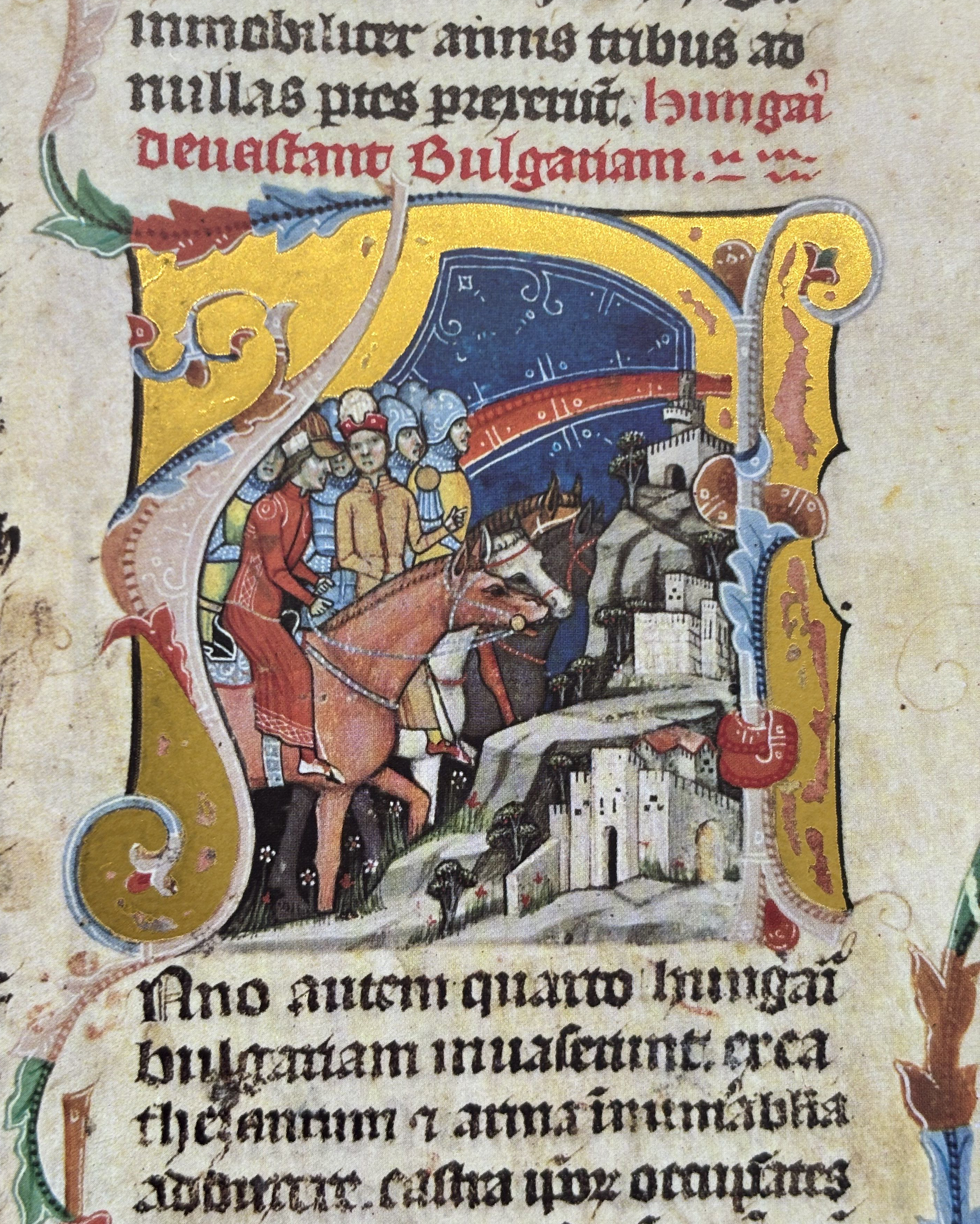
The Hungarians devastate Bulgaria (Illuminated Chronicle, 1358)

== Sources ==
=== Written sources ===
Byzantine authors were the first to record these events. The earliest work is Emperor Leo the Wise's Tactics, finished around 904, which recounts the Bulgarian-Byzantine war of 894–896, a military conflict directly preceding the Hungarians' departure from the Pontic steppes. Nearly contemporary narration can be read in the Continuation of the Chronicle by George the Monk. However, De Administrando Imperio ("On Governing the Empire") provides the most detailed account. It was compiled under the auspices of Emperor Constantine VII Porphyrogenitus in 951 or 952.

Works written by clergymen in the successor states of the Carolingian Empire narrate events closely connected to the conquest. The Annals of Fulda which ends in 901 is the earliest among them. A letter from Archbishop Theotmar of Salzburg to Pope John IX in 900 also refers to the conquering Hungarians, but it is often regarded as a fake document. Abbot Regino of Prüm who compiled his World Chronicle around 908, sums up his knowledge on the Hungarians in a sole entry under "the year 889". Another valuable source is Bishop Liutprand of Cremona's Antapodosis ("Retribution") from around 960. Aventinus, a 16th-century historian, provides information that is not known by the other works which suggests that he used now-lost sources. However, his work is not considered to be a reliable source.

An Old Church Slavonic compilation of Lives of saints preserved an eyewitness account on the Bulgarian-Byzantine war of 894–896. The first Life of Saint Naum, written around 924, contains nearly contemporary information on the fall of the Great Moravia caused by Hungarian invasions, although its earliest extant copy is from the 15th century. Similarly late manuscripts (the oldest of which was written in the 14th century) offer the text of the Russian Primary Chronicle, a historical work completed in 1113. It provides information based on earlier Byzantine and Moravian sources.

The Hungarians initially preserved the memory of the major events in "the form of folk songs and ballads", according to C.A. Macartney. The earliest local chronicle was compiled in the late 11th century. It exists in more than one variant, its original version having been extended and rewritten several times during the Middle Ages. For instance, the 14th-century Illuminated Chronicle contains texts from the 11th-century chronicle.

An anonymous author's Gesta Hungarorum ("Deeds of the Hungarians"), written before 1200, is the earliest extant local chronicle. However, according to Macartney, this "most misleading" example "of all the early Hungarian texts" contains much information that cannot be confirmed based on the contemporaneous sources. Around 1283 Simon of Kéza, a priest at the Hungarian royal court, wrote the next surviving chronicle. He claims that the Hungarians were closely related to the Huns, earlier conquerors of the Carpathian Basin that emigrated from the Asian steppes. Accordingly, in his narration, the Hungarian invasion is in fact a second conquest of the same territory by the same people.

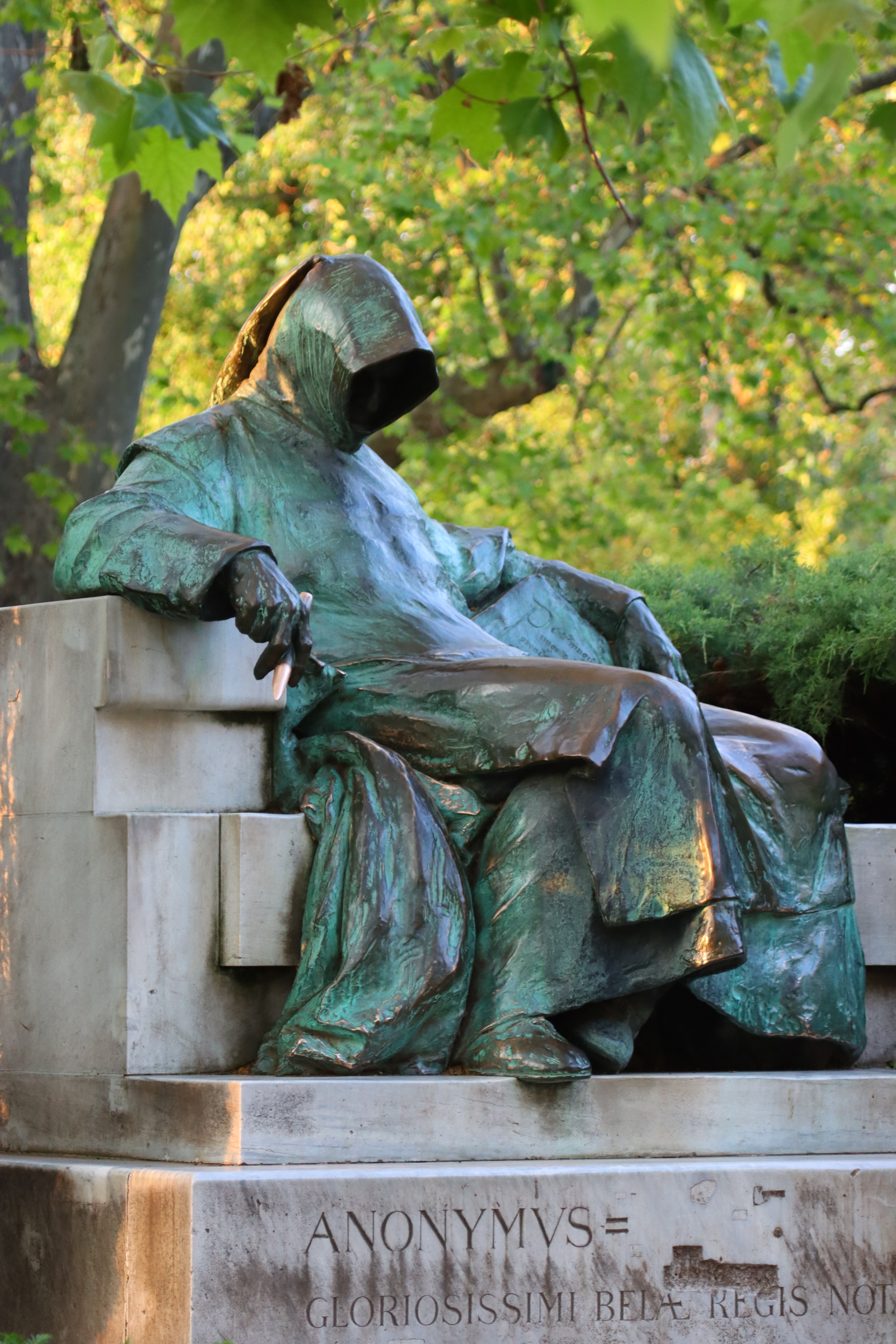
Statue of Anonymus, the author of the Gesta Hungarorum in Vajdahunyad Castle in Budapest

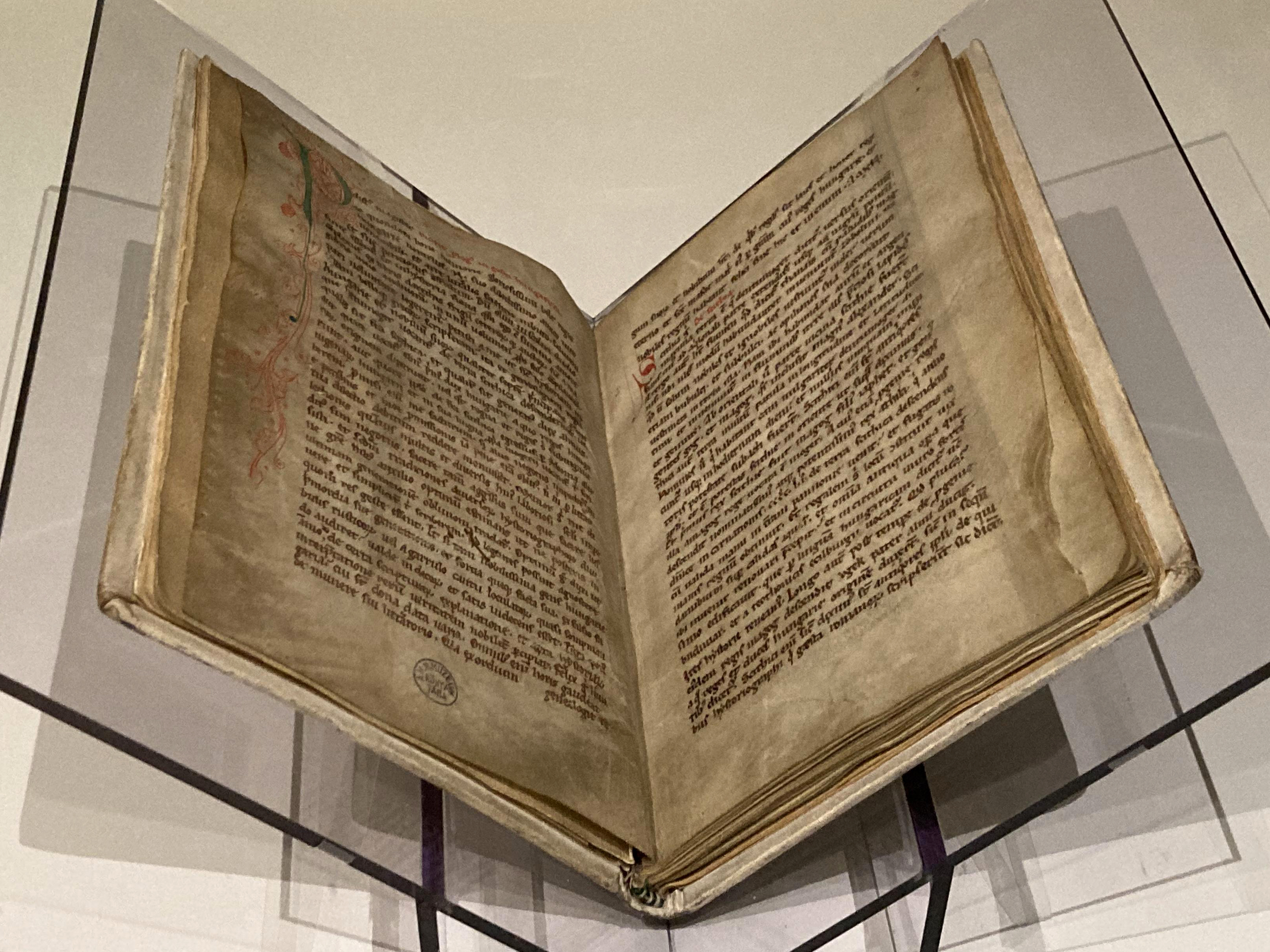
The principal subject of the Gesta Hungarorum is the Hungarian conquest of the Carpathian Basin at the turn of the 9th and 10th centuries, and it writes of the origin of the Hungarians, identifying the Hungarians' ancestors with the ancient Scythians and Huns

The Illuminated Chronicle from the court of King Louis the Great of Hungary from 1358

=== Archaeology ===
Some decades after the Hungarian conquest, a new synthesis of earlier cultures, the "Bijelo Brdo culture" spread in all over the Carpathian Basin, with its characteristic jewellery, including S-shaped earrings. The lack of archaeological finds connected to horses in "Bijelo Brdo" graves is another feature of these cemeteries. The earliest "Bijelo Brdo" assemblages are dated via unearthed coins to the rule of Constantine VII Porphyrogenitus in the middle of the 10th century. Early cemeteries of the culture were unearthed, for instance, at Beremend and Csongrád in Hungary, at Devín and Bešenovo in Slovakia, at Pilu and Moldoveneşti in Romania and at Vukovar and Kloštar Podravski in Croatia.

Graves of the first generations of the conquering Hungarians were identified in the Carpathian Basin, but fewer than ten definitively Hungarian cemeteries have been unearthed in the Pontic steppes. Most Hungarian cemeteries include 25 or 30 inhumation graves, but isolated burials were common. Adult males (and sometimes women and children) were buried together with either parts of their horses or with harness and other objects symbolizing a horse. The graves also yielded decorated silver belts, sabretaches furnished with metal plates, pear-shaped stirrups and other metal works. Many of these objects had close analogues in the contemporaneous archaeological cultures (e.g. Kushnarenkovo culture) from Cis-Ural and Trans-Ural region, and multiethnic "Saltovo-Mayaki culture" of the Pontic steppes. Most cemeteries from the 9th and 10th centuries are concentrated in the Upper Tisza region and in the plains along the rivers Rába and Vág, but early small cemeteries were also unearthed at Kolozsvár (Cluj-Napoca), Marosgombás (Aiud) and other Transylvanian sites.

=== Archaeogenetics ===
A genetic study published in the Annals of Human Genetics in March 2008 analyzed 4 samples from the 10th century, and two carried North Eurasian Y-DNA haplogroup N1a1-Tat ("previously called Tat or N1c", M46). A 2009 study also examined mtDNA variation in 31 ancient horses from the Pannonian Basin, 17 from Avar and 14 from Hungarian conquest period, and "Avar sequences were genetically heterogeneous, closely related to Eastern breeds including the north Russian Tuva and Vyatskaya groups ... by contrast, the early Hungarian horses showed a relatively close relationship with the Akhal-Teke and Norwegian Ffjord breeds [and] at least at the level of high quality horses, our results show that the ethnic changes induced by the Hungarian Conquest in the late 9th century were accompanied by a similar change in the stables of the Carpathian Basin". A 2011 study on lactase persistence polymorphism of 23 elite and commoner samples from the 10-11th century found that their low prevalence of lactase persistence "corresponds well with those of present-day populations of the Uralic linguistic family, such as the Khantys, Mansis and Maris, and certain Central-Asian and Turkish populations" and "additional mtDNA testing identified six major mtDNA haplogroups (H, U, T, N1a, JT, X) among Hungarian conquerors, six among commoners from the time of the conquest (H, HV, M, R, T, U)", including those of Asian origin (like N, M and U4).

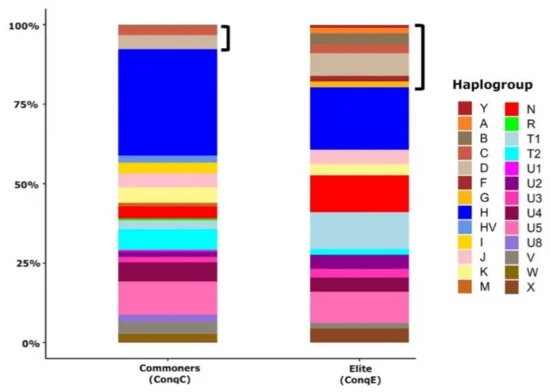
"Comparison of the major Hg distributions from ancient Hungarian populations ... Brackets mark east Eurasian Hgs", by Maár et al. 2021

A comprehensive archaeogenetic study published in Scientific Reports in September 2016 examined mtDNA of 76 Hungarian-conquest period samples, and "West-Eurasian haplogroups (H, HV, I, J, K, N1a, R, T, U, V, X, W) were present at a frequency of 77%, and Central and East-Eurasian haplogroups (A, B, C, D, F, G, M) at 23%". In conclusion, "both the linguistically recorded Finno-Ugric roots and historically documented Turkic and Central Asian influxes had possible genetic imprints in the conquerors' genetic composition". In the same year, Molecular Genetics and Genomics was published, a study of 17 samples of first generation Hungarian conqueror cemeteries, revealing that "the most frequent [mtDNA] Hg was B, which together with Hg A indicate that about 30% of the Karos population is genetically connected to Central and East Asia. The majority of Hg-s (H, U, T, J, X) are of Eurasian origin, however, it is remarkable that two individuals belong to subhaplogroup H6, which may also indicate Asian connection ... The single X2f maternal haplotype of the chief (sample 11) is of particular interest, as this haplotype is most probably of south Caucasian origin...", while only four had a Y-DNA Hg (typical European 2x I2a and R1b). A genetic study published in PLOS One in October 2018 examined the mtDNA of individuals from 10th-century graves associated with the Hungarian conquerors of the Basin. The majority of their maternal lineages were traced back to the Potapovka, Srubnaya and Poltavka cultures of the Pontic–Caspian steppe, while one-third of their maternal lineages could be traced back to Inner Asia, probably being derived from Asian Scythians and the Xiongnu (Asian Huns). The mtDNA of the conquerors was found to be most closely related to the Onoğur-Bulgar ancestors of the Volga Tatars. The conquerors did not display significant genetic relations to other Finno-Ugric peoples. The evidence implied that the conquerors did not contribute significantly to the gene pool of modern Hungarians. A 2021 study analyzed maternal lineages from 202 10-11th century commoners from Carpathian Basin and compared them to conqueror elite, finding that "the haplogroup composition of the commoner population markedly differs from that of the elite, and, in contrast to the elite, commoners cluster with European populations. Alongside this, detectable sub-haplogroup sharing indicates admixture between the elite and the commoners. The majority of the 10–11th century commoners most likely represent local populations of the Carpathian Basin, which admixed with the eastern immigrant groups (which included conquering Hungarians)".

A genetic study published in Scientific Reports in November 2019 examined the remains of 29 Hungarian conquerors of the Carpathian Basin. The majority of them carried Y-DNA of West Eurasian origin, but at least 30% of East Eurasian & broadly Eurasian (N1a-M2004, N1a-Z1936, Q1a and R1a-Z2124). They carried a higher amount of West Eurasian paternal ancestry than West Eurasian maternal ancestry. Among modern populations, their paternal ancestry was the most similar to Bashkirs. Haplogroup I2a1a2b was observed among several conquerors of particularly high rank. This haplogroup is of European origin and is today particularly common among South Slavs. A wide variety of phenotypes were observed, with several individuals having blond hair and blue eyes, and some had East Asian admixture. The study also analyzed three Hunnic samples from the Carpathian Basin in the 5th century, and these displayed genetic similarities to the conquerors. The Hungarian conquerors appeared to be a recently assembled heterogenous group incorporating both European, Asian and Eurasian elements. In the same year the journal published an analysis of N3a4-Z1936 which is still found in very rare frequencies in modern Hungarians, and showed that Hungarian "sub-clade [N-B539/Y13850] splits from its sister-branch N3a4-B535, frequent today among Northeast European Uralic speakers, 4000-5000 ya, which is in the time-frame of the proposed divergence of Ugric languages", while on N-B539/Y13850+ sub-clade level confirmed shared paternal lineages with modern Ugric (Mansis and Khantys via N-B540/L1034) and Turkic speakers (Bashkirs and Volga Tatars via N-B540/L1034 and N-B545/Y24365).

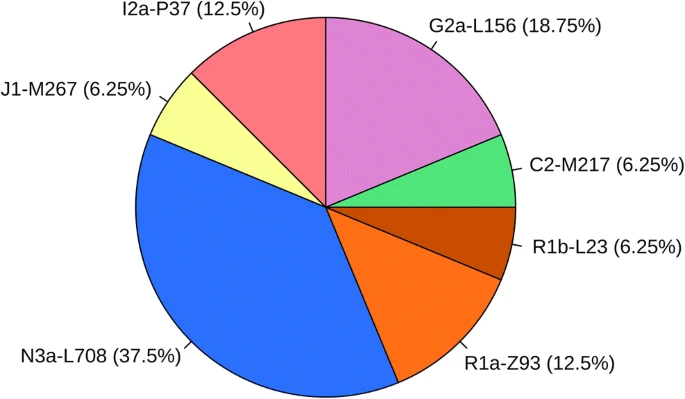
The frequency of paternal haplogroups in the Hungarian Conqueror samples based on 19 samples (Fóthi et al. 2020)

A genetic study published in the Archaeological and Anthropological Sciences in January 2020 examined the remains of 19 male Hungarian conquerors. These conquerors were found to be carriers of a diverse set of haplogroups, and displayed genetic links to Turkic peoples, Finno-Ugric peoples and Slavs. More than 37% of them carried types of haplogroup N3a-L708 (mainly N3a4-Z1936, N3a4-Z1936 > Y13850, N3a4-Z1936 > Y13850 > L1034; less N3a2-M2118, present in Yakuts). This evidence suggested that the conquerors were of Ugric descent and spoke a Ugric language. A 2020 archaeogenetic and archaeological study published in Scientific Reports of 36 samples from Cis-Ural region and 9 Hungarian conquerors confirmed connection of paternal Hg N-Z1936 (> N-B545/Y24365) and maternal Hg N1a1 via common ancient population in addition to archaeological, historical and linguistic sources, implying the Hungarian homeland was "probably in the southern Trans-Ural region, where the Kushnarenkovo culture was disseminated [where] Lomovatovo and Nevolino cultures are archaeologically related to ancient Hungarians".

A genetic study published in the European Journal of Human Genetics in July 2020 examined the skeletal remains of Árpád dynasty descendant and King Béla III of Hungary and unknown Árpád member named as "II/52" / "HU52" from the Royal Basilica of Székesfehérvár. It was established that the male lineage of the Árpáds belonged to the Y-haplogroup R1a subclade R-Z2125 > R-Z2123 > R-Y2632 > R-Y2633 > R-SUR51. The subclade was also found in nearest contemporary matches of 48 Bashkirs from the Burzyansky and Abzelilovsky districts of the Republic of Bashkortostan in the Volga-Ural region, and 1 individual from the region of Vojvodina, Serbia. The Árpád members and one individual from Serbia share additional private SNPs making a novel subclade R-SUR51 > R-ARP, and as the mentioned individual has additional private SNPs it branches from the medieval Árpáds forming R-ARP > R-UVD. Based on the data of the distribution, appearance and coalescence estimation of R-Y2633, the dynasty traces ancient origin near northern Afghanistan about 4,500 years ago, with a separation date of R-ARP from the closest kin Bashkirs from the Volga-Ural region to 2,000 years ago, while the individual from Serbia (R-UVD) descends from the Árpáds about 900 years ago. As the separation of haplogroup N-B539 between the Hungarians and Bashkirs is estimated to have occurred 2,000 years ago, it implies that the ancestors of Hungarians having Ugric and Turkic ancestry left the Volga Ural region about 2,000 years ago, and started a migration that eventually culminated in settlement in the Carpathian Basin.

An archaeogenetic study published in scientific journal Current Biology in May 2022 examined "48 from 10th century Conquering Hungarian elite cemeteries, 65 from commoner cemeteries of the Hungarian conquer-early Árpádian Period (10-11th centuries)". According to autosomal analysis, the Hungarian elite core can be modeled as ~50% Mansi-like, ~35% Sarmatian-like, and ~15% Hun/Xiongnu-like, and the Mansi-Sarmatian admixture event is suggested to have taken place in the Southern Ural region at 643–431 BCE, while Mansi-Hun around 217-315 CE. However, most individuals can be modeled as two-way admixtures of "Conq_Asia_Core" and "Eur_Core". The elite males carried, among others, East Eurasian Y-DNA haplogroups N1a, D1a, C2a, with Q1a and R1a-Z94 being sign of Hun-related ancestry, "generally accompanied by Asian maternal lineages". Notably, almost exclusively in the elite were present I2-Y3120 subclades, "very often accompanied by Asian maternal lineages, indicating that I2a1a2b1a1a could be more typical for the immigrants than to the local population". The study also showed "that a common 'proto-Ugric' gene pool appeared in the Bronze Age from the admixture of Mezhovskaya and Nganasan people, supporting genetic and linguistic data".

Another study published in 2022, taking into account the genetic data originating from ancient proto-Ob-Ugric people from Western Siberia (6th–13th century), the pre-Conquest period and subsisting Hungarians from the Volga-Ural region (6th–14th century) and their neighbours, emphasises the connection of Hungarian Conquerors with Iron Age Sargat culture. The earliest traces of their ancestors' settlements can be found in the territory bordered by the Rivers Tobol, Irtysh and Ishim in the Trans-Urals and the western zone of south-western Siberia from where they crossed the River Volga and moved to the territory lying to the north of the Black Sea, at the beginning of the 9th century. According to the study there was "little or no biological connection between the ancestors of Hungarians and proto-Ob-Ugric groups in Western Siberia, despite their close geographical proximity for 1500–2000 years after their split estimated by linguistic models and chronology." and that "In the Carpathian Basin, the new settlers and the local population started admixing only in the second half of the 10th century". The study also concludes that man and women came together in the Carpathian Basin with some maternal lineages originating in the east also surviving in the area. The main paternal lineages of the Hungarian conquerors belong to the haplogroup N, at a total of 36.8%, with variable amounts (from 6.1% to 1%) still found in the modern Hungarian population.

== Artistic representation ==
The most famous perpetuation of the events is the Arrival of the Hungarians or Feszty Panorama which is a large cyclorama (a circular panoramic painting) by Hungarian painter Árpád Feszty and his assistants. It was completed in 1894 for the 1,000th anniversary of the event. Since the 1,100th anniversary of the event in 1995, the painting has been displayed in the Ópusztaszer National Heritage Park, Hungary. Mihály Munkácsy also depicted the event under the name of Conquest for the Hungarian Parliament Building in 1893.

== See also ==
- List of Hungarian rulers
- Magyar tribes
- Origin of the Székelys
- Principality of Hungary
