= Karayakupovo culture =

Archaeological culture in the Southern Urals

- Geographical range: Southern Ural
- Period: Iron Age, Middle Ages
- Dates: c. 800 – c. 900
- Preceded by: Kushnarenkovo culture

Karayakupovo culture was an archaeological culture in the Southern Urals. The Karayakupovo culture together with Kushnarenkovo archaeological culture are thought to be the archaeological manifestation of the Ugrians, the ancestors of the Hungarians. Alternatively, they may represent ancient Bashkirs., as the Karayakupovo culture occupied the edge of historic Bashkortostan in 9th-10th centuries.

== The cultural dwellings ==
Remains of the culture have been found in Karayakupovskoe, Old Kalmashevskoe, Chatrinskoe, Taptykovskoe, Kushnarenkovskoe, Chukraklinskoe, Duvaneyskoe, Sasykulskoe, Davlekanovskiy etc. settlements.

The area of the dwellings was about 1,000 square meters. They were located on high ground and were reinforced by one or two low walls and moats.

== Ritual cremation ==
The culture is also represented by earthen mounds with a diameter of 8–10 m and a height of 40–60 cm over the graves. Near the graves and within them there are traces of ritually buried horse (skins, heads and four legs). People were buried in wooden coffins.

In the bottom of the graves are littered coffins and woolen cloth. Coffins held fire before being lowered into the grave. This simulated ritual cremation. The feet of the dead are often found with ropes - presumably so the dead could not stand up and do harm to the living. On the coffin are sometimes found leather bridle sets. Sometimes pits were dug near the grave as caches for saddle and bridle sets.

== Literature ==
1. История башкирского народа : в 7 т./ гл. ред. М.М. Кульшарипов; Институт истории, языка и литературы УНЦ РАН. Уфа.: изд. Гилем, 2012. - 400 с.: ил. - ISBN 978-5-02-037008-1. т. 2. – 2012. – ISBN 978-5-91608-100-8
2. Иванов В.А. Путями степных кочевий. Уфа, Башкнижиздат, 1984, С. 38–58.
3. Васюткин С.М. Некоторые спорные вопросы археологии Башкирии. СА, No.1, 1968, с. 69–71; Археологическая карта Башкирии. М., 1976, с. 31, 32.
4. Мажитов Н.А. Новые материалы о ранней истории башкир. Уфа, АЭБ, Т.2, 1964б, с. 104–108; 1968, с. 69, 70.
5. Матвеева Г.И., 1968а, 1975; Мажитов Н.А. Южный Урал в VII-XIV вв. Москва, 1977, с. 60–74.
6. Мажитов Н.А. Курганный могильник в деревне Ново-Турбаслы//Башкирский археологический сборник. Уфа, 1959, с. 125, рис. 3; Матвеева Г.И., 1968б, рис. 19.
7. Мажитов Н.А. Бахмутинская культура. М., 1968, табл. 26.
8. Мажитов Н.А. Южный Урал в VII-XIV вв. Москва, 1977, с. 63, 73, 74, табл. XXI, XXII.
9. Мажитов Н.А. Южный Урал в VII-XIV вв. Москва, 1977, с. 17, 19.
10. Ковалевская В.Б., Краснов Ю.А. Рецензия на книгу Эрдели//СА, No.2, 1973, с. 287; Амброз А.К. Рецензия на книгу Эрдели//СА, No.2, 1973б, с. 297.
11. Матвеева Г.И. Памятники караякуповского типа в Приуралье//Из истории Среднего Поволжья и Приуралья. Куйбышев, вып.5, 1975, с. 19; Генинг В.Ф., 1972, с. 270–272.
12. Старостин П.Н. Памятники именьковской культуры//САИ, вып. Д1-32, 1967, с. 21, 26, табл. 13, 13, 15.
13. Генинг В.Ф. Азелинская культура III-V вв//Вопросы археологии Урала. Ижевск, вып.5, 1963, с. 26, 27, табл. XXIV, 5.
14. Ахмеров Р. Б. Уфимские погребения VI-VIII вв. н.э. и их место в древней истории Башкирии//Древности Башкирии. М., 1951, с. 126–131.
