= Kushnarenkovo culture =

Iron Age Southern Ural archaeological culture

- Geographical range: Southern Ural
- Period: Late Iron Age
- Dates: c. 500 – c. 700
- Preceded by: Sargat culture Bakal culture Potchevash culture
- Followed by: Karayakupovo culture

The Kushnarenkovo culture is an archaeological culture of the Iron Age in the Southern Ural. First described V. F. Gening on the basis of excavations carried out in 1955–1959 years in the cemetery in Kushnarenkovo (Bashkortostan).

Localization in 6th-8th centuries on the territory of Zakamye, in the basins of White, Kama and Ik rivers. It is assumed that the culture came in the middle of VI. forest-steppe regions of the Trans-Urals and Western Siberia. In the 8th century to the west of the Ural from other groups arose Karayakupovo culture.

Archaeologists have found that the studied tribes at an early stage (in 6th-8th centuries) were buried under mounds, the heads to north. Skull buried - with signs of artificial deformation. Later, the head to the dead already oriented to the west. The burials of the remains of weapons, horse gear, a variety of jewelry and ceramics. A significant amount of pottery found on the settlements. All dishes molded, round-form. Noteworthy is its elegance of ornamentation.

The population of Kushnarenkovo culture most researchers associated with the nomadic Ugrian tribes. A. Kh. Khalikov, E. A. Khalikova, V. A. Ivanov considered them ancient Magyars (the ancestors of Hungarians). N. A. Mazhitov thinks that the population of Kushnarenkovo culture were the ancestors of the ancient Bashkirs. V. Csáky and D. Gerber have found significant genetic relationships between conqueror Hungarians and samples taken from a late Kushnarenkovo cemetery used from the end of eighth century to the eleventh century.
