= Sargat culture =

Archaeological culture in Western Siberia

Sargatka culture
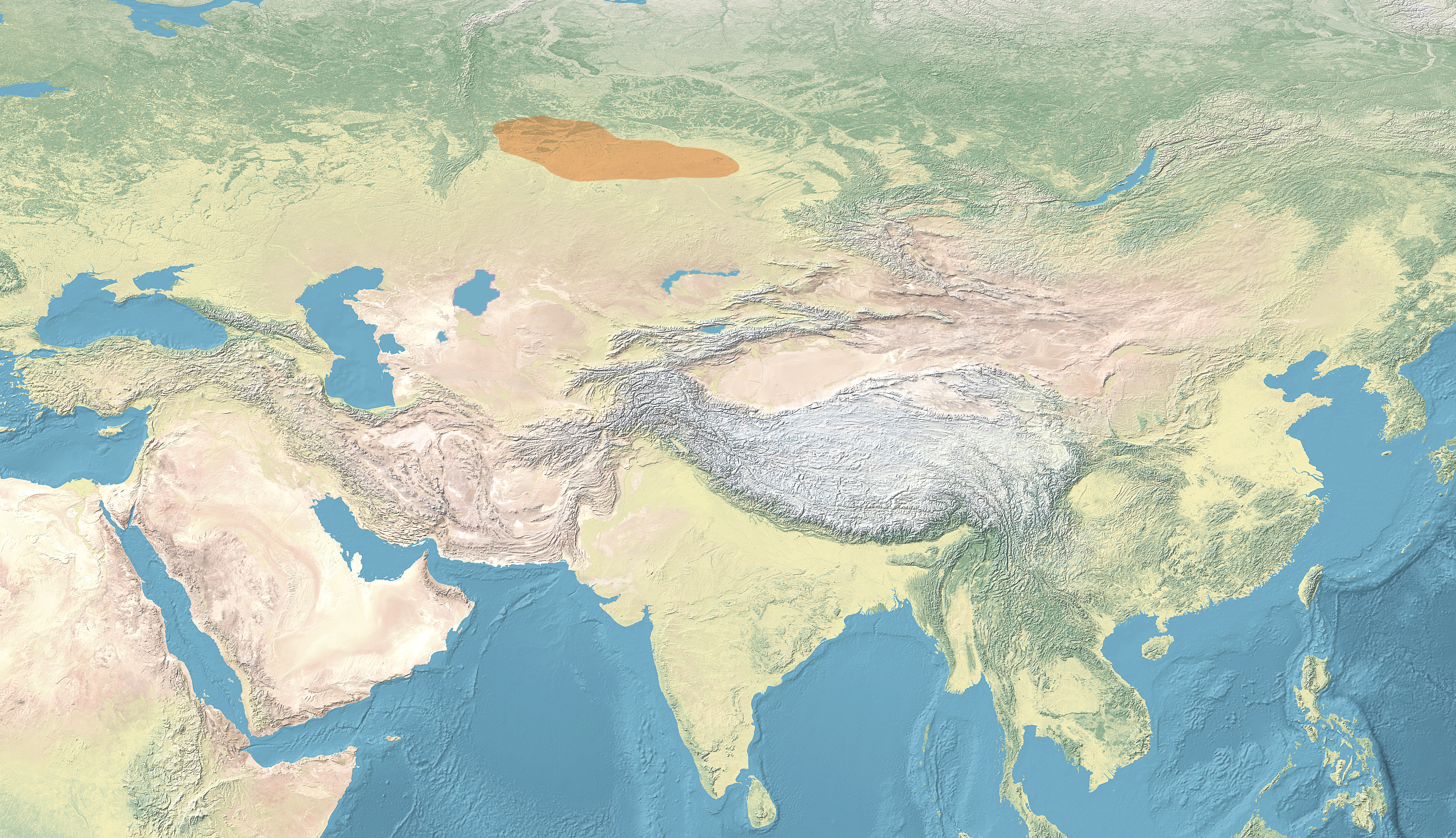
- Location of the Sargatka culture, with contemporary cultures in the 5th century BCE
- Geographical range: Siberia
- Dates: 7th century BCE to 5th centuries CE
- Preceded by: Barkhatovo culture, Itkul culture, Baitovo culture, Gorokhovo culture, Irmen culture
- Followed by: Bakal culture

Sargat (Sargatka) culture was a sedentary archaeological culture that existed between 7th century BC and 5th century AD in the forest-steppes of Western Siberia. It was closely related to the neighbouring Gorokhovo culture to the west (which it seems to have gradually assimilated).

The Sargatka tribes are known for using heavy Sarmatian-style armor and for protecting their settlements with earthen ramparts and timber walls (sometimes featuring watchtowers). This may be the polity mentioned as Northern Wuyibie in the Records of the Three Kingdoms and placed to the north from the nomadic confederacy of Kangju.

Archeological and genetic evidence suggest that Sargatka culture was a potential zone of intermixture between native Ugrian and/or Siberian populations and steppe peoples from the south, possibly of early Iranian or Indo-Iranian stock.

== Territory ==
Sargatka cultural horizon encompassed northern forest steppe zone between the Tobol and Irtysh rivers, which is currently located in Russia and Kazakhstan. The northernmost Sargatka culture presence is found near Tobolsk, on the border of the forest zone. In the south, the area of culture coincides with the southern border of the forest-steppe. Eastern foothills of the Urals make up the western boundary of the culture, meanwhile Baraba forest-steppe forms the eastern edge for Sargatka settlements and burial grounds. The culture is named after the village of Sargatskoye on the Sargatka River, which is located near a Sargatka burial ground.

== Society ==
=== Metallurgy ===
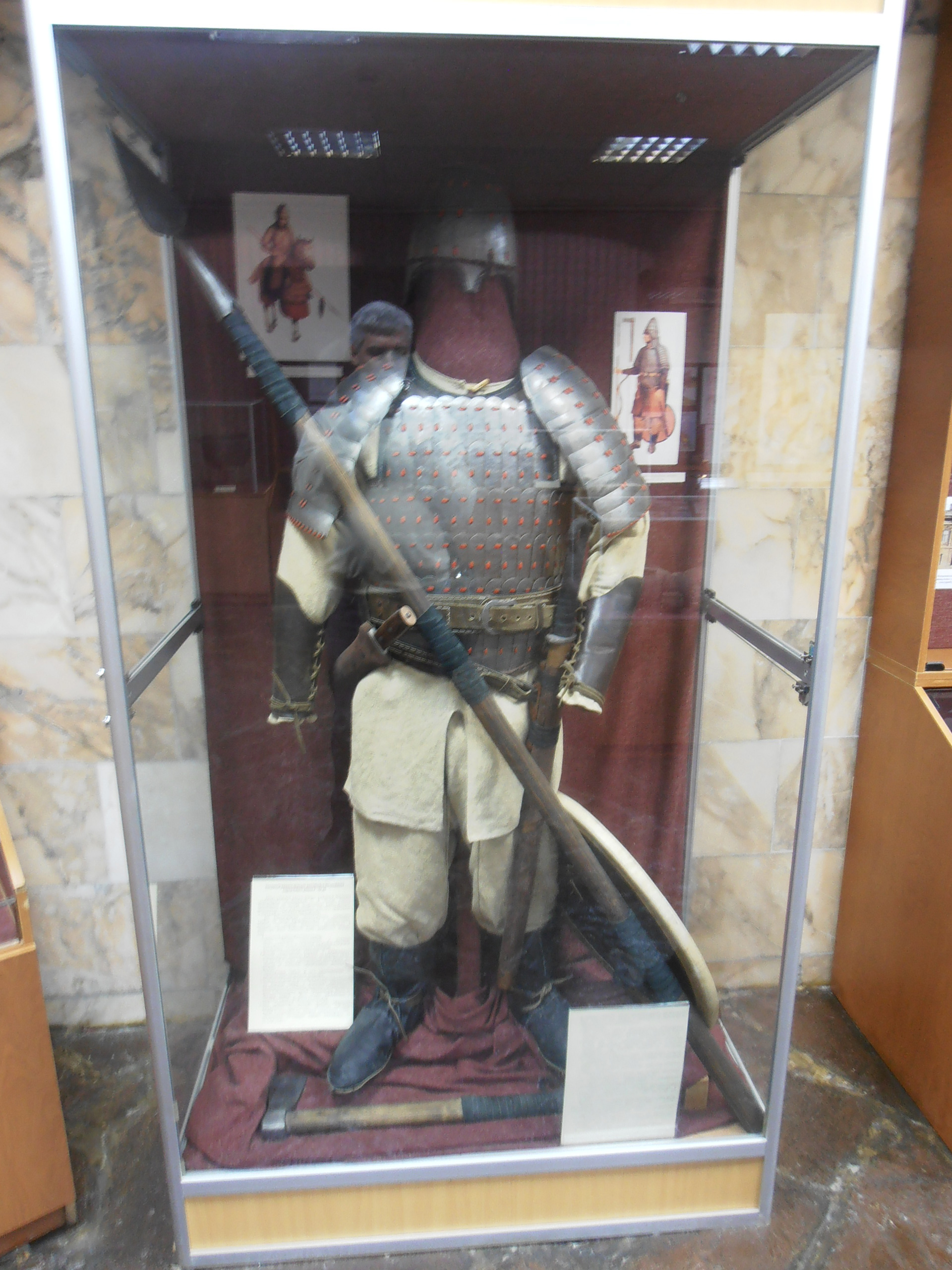
Reconstruction of the armament of a Sargatka warrior in Museum of Archeology and Ethnography in Tyumen

Sargatka metallurgy shows a domestic character. The remains of simple blast furnaces and forges have been discovered in some settlements associated with the culture. The increasing production of Sargatka iron supplied the local population and its nomadic neighbors. Metallographic examination of Sargatka material shows that objects made of malleable iron and steel of average and high quality were prevalent. Unevenly carbonized steel was produced directly in the blast furnace. On average, carbonized steel resulted from a special process of cementation was used for weapon production. Forging, multilayered welding, and tempering was known as well, though quality of welding was not high and the temperature regime was rather unstable.

== Genetics ==
mt-DNA samples isolated from individuals associated with the Sargatka culture showed that A, C, T1, Z, B4a, N1a1a1a, U5a1, H, H8, and C4a2c1 haplogroups were present among the population. N1a1, R1a1, Q1 and R1b are the Y-chromosomal haplogroups that were isolated from Sargatka remains.

According to a 2021 study that examined genome-wide data of various ancient Central Asian steppe peoples, the northern sedentary Sargatka-related cultures show a close genetic proximity with the eastern nomadic Scythians, the Sakas. The examined Sargatka individuals also display additional affinity not found in the Scythian groups, ultimately related to a northern Siberian lineage. They represent a typical Saka combination of Khövsgöl and Steppe_MLBA ancestry with a small BMAC contribution, and a small specific Siberian contribution (Ekven IA). The results affirms the historical hypothesis that the Sargatka culture formed as a result of admixture between incoming Scythian groups and an unknown local or neighboring population that possibly carried this extra Siberian ancestry.

Map of Kulay (orange) and Sargatka cultures (green).

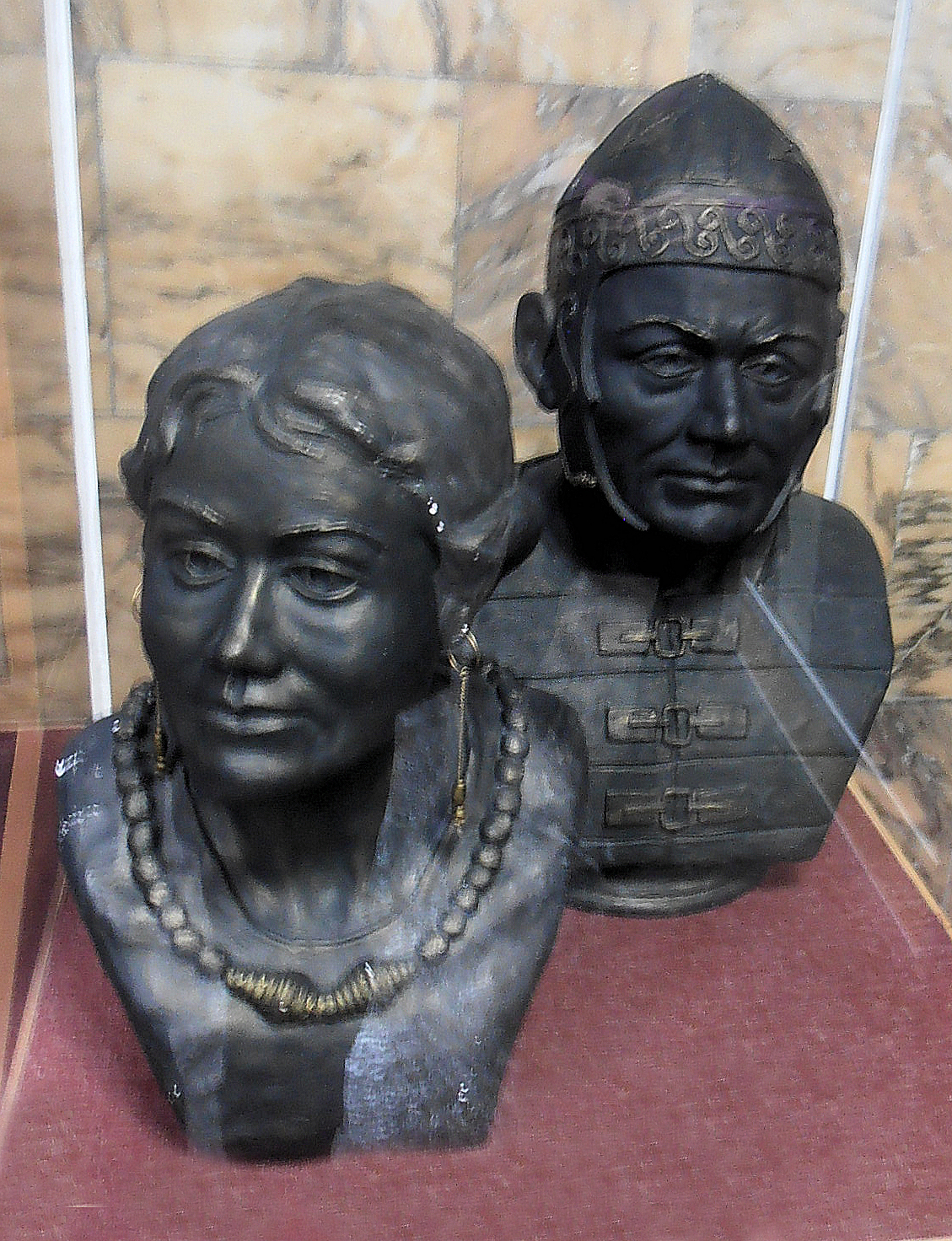
Sargatka culture individuals (forensic reconstruction)

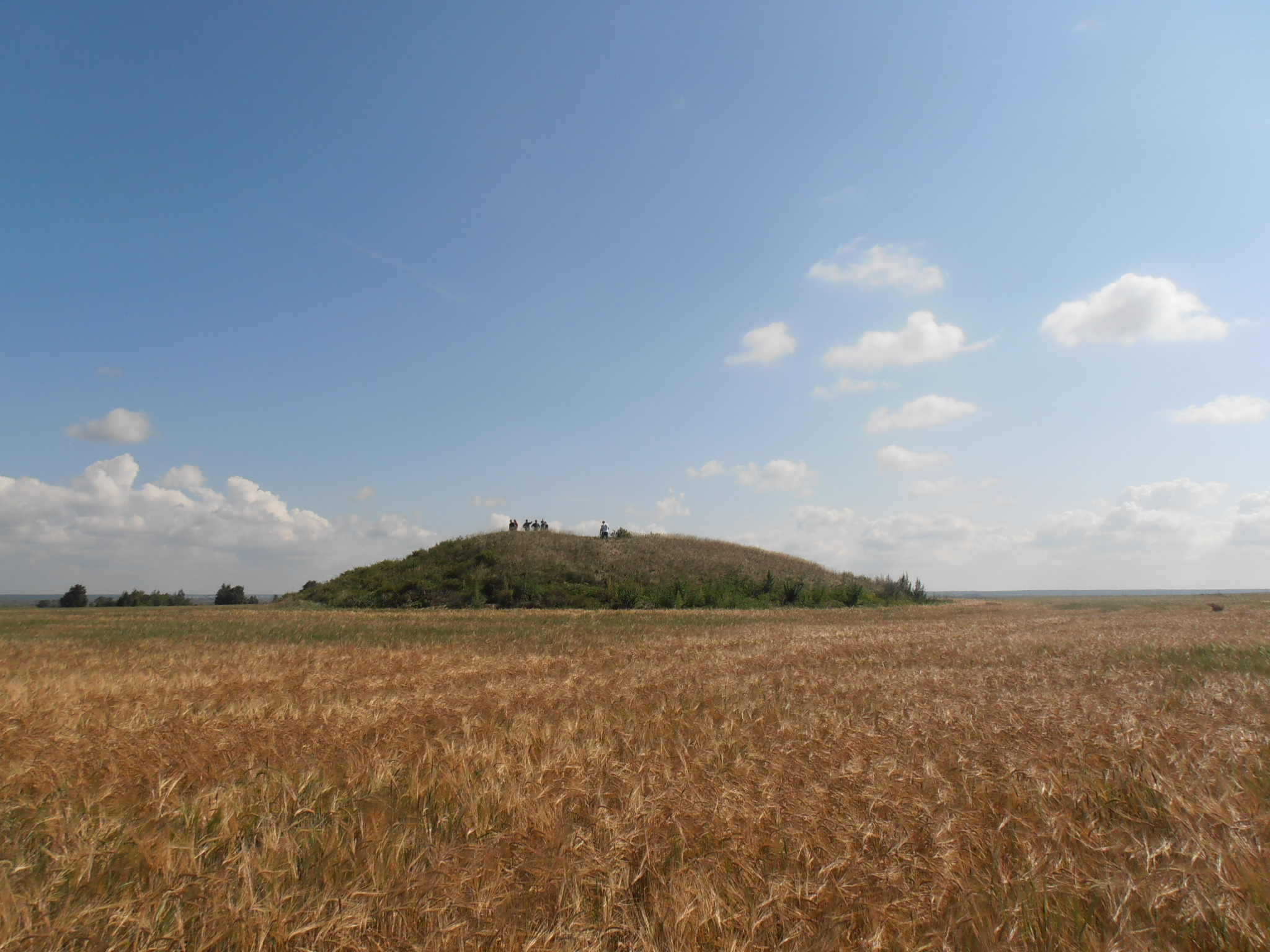
Kurgan Krasnogorsky-2 (Ingala Valley). Sargatka culture

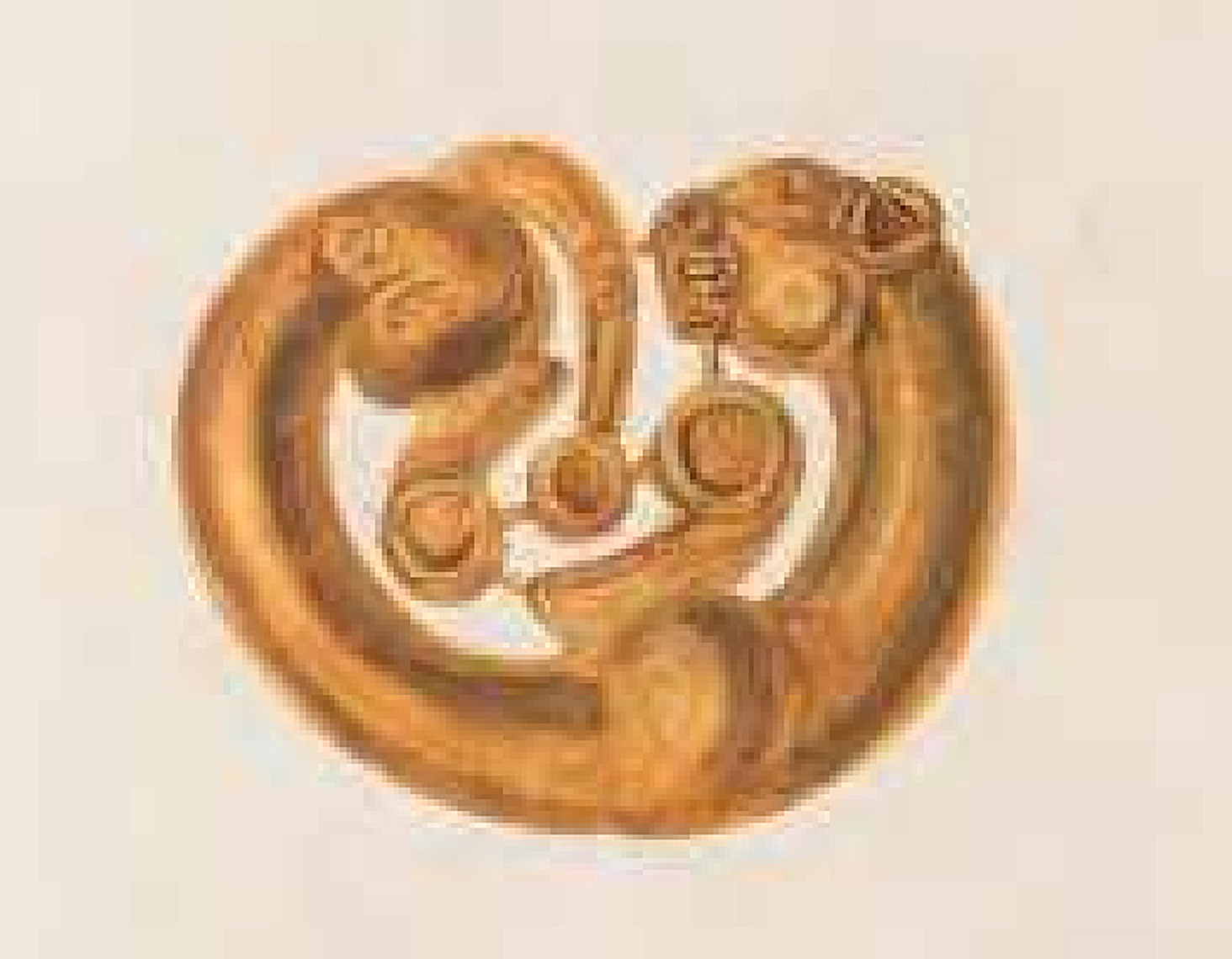
Object of the Siberian Collection of Peter the Great, sent by M. P. Gagarin, governor of Siberia in Tobolsk, in 1716. Dated to the 7th century BCE. State Hermitage Museum, Si 1727 1-88.

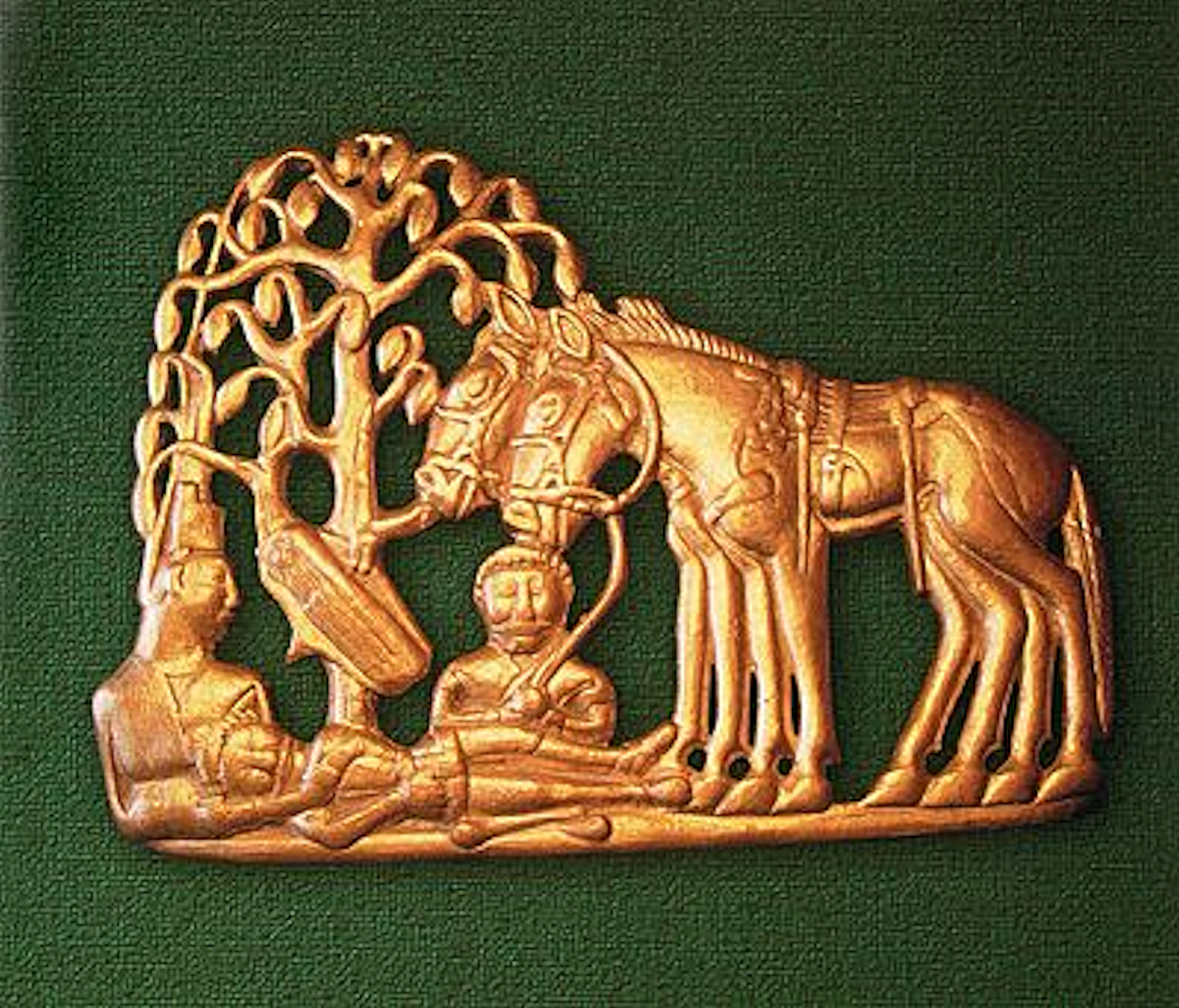
Belt plaque from the Siberian collection of Peter the Great, sent by M. P. Gagarin, governor of Siberia in Tobolsk, in 1716. Dated circa 300 BCE. State Hermitage Museum, Si 1727 1-162.

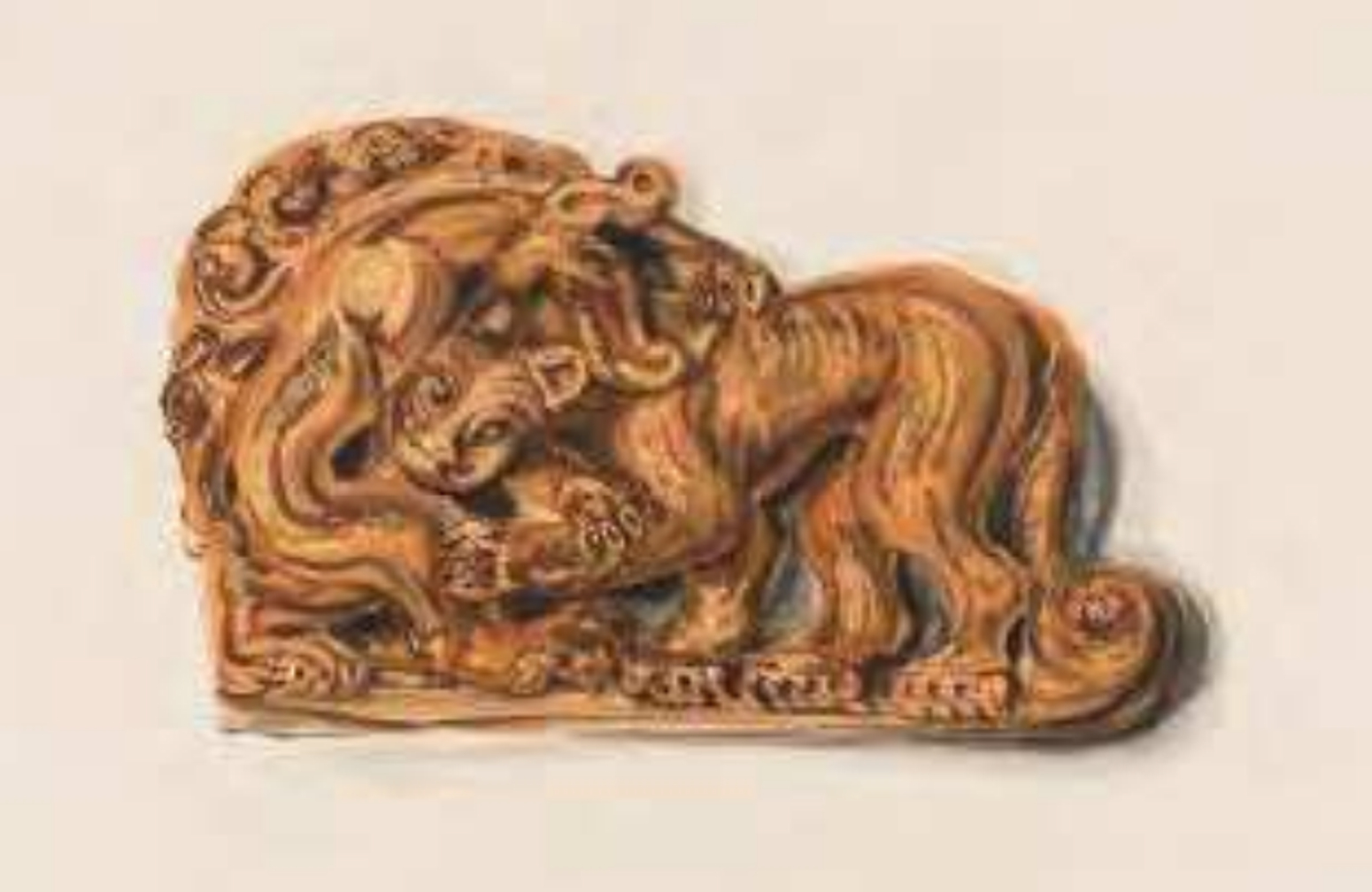
Watercolour drawing of a contest between tiger and monster from the 1730s, Siberian Collection of Peter the Great. Object sent by M. P. Gagarin, governor of Siberia in Tobolsk, in 1716. Dated circa 300 BCE. State Hermitage Museum, Si 1727 1-11.

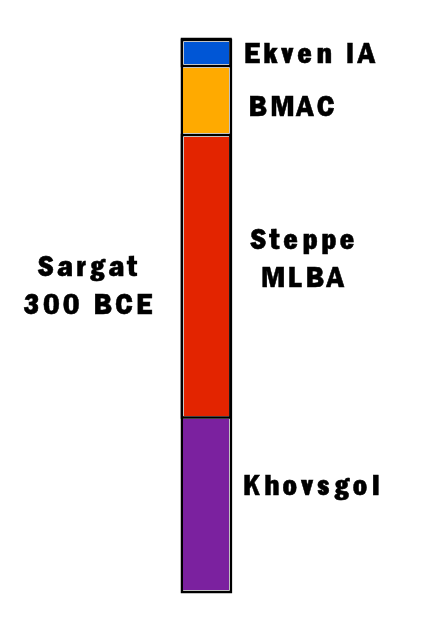
Sargatka ancestry. This is a typical Saka combination of Khövsgöl and Steppe_MLBA ancestry with a small BMAC contribution, and a small specific Siberian contribution (Ekven IA).

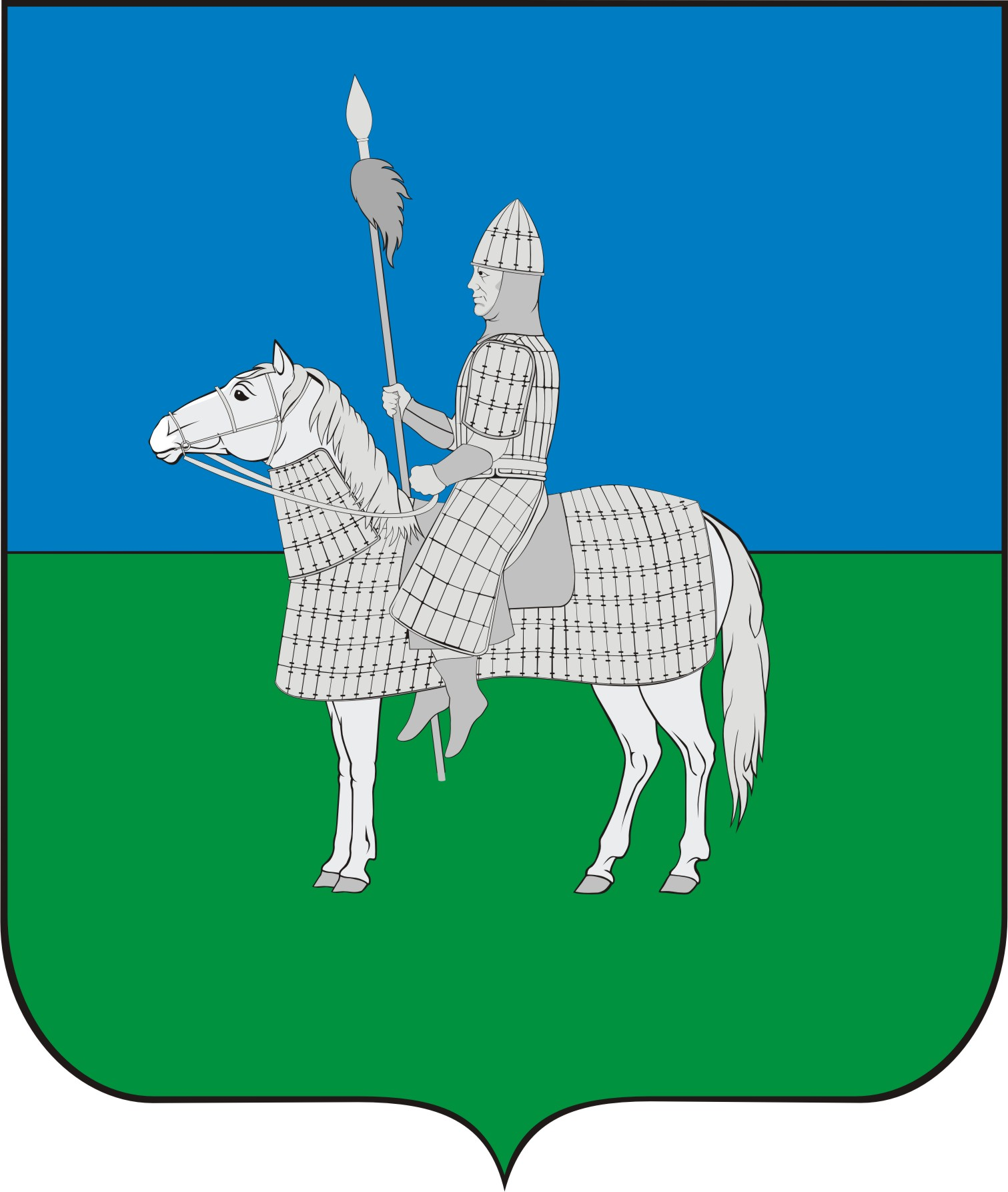
Coat of arm of the Sargat region

== See also ==
- Ingala Valley
