= Gorokhovo culture =

Archaeological culture in Russia

- Location of the Gorokhovo culture, with contemporary cultures in the 5th century BCE
- Geographical range: Siberia
- Dates: 6h century BCE to 3rd centuries CE
- Preceded by: Barkhatovo culture, Itkul culture, Baitovo culture
- Followed by: Bakal culture

The Gorokhovo culture (гороховская культура) was an Iron Age culture of the Scytho-Siberian world that occupied the eastern side of the Ural Mountains from the 6th to the 3rd century BCE. It is similar to, yet distinct from, the neighbouring Sargat culture to the east.

Though (as of 2023) the Gorokhovo DNA data is lacking, the Gorokhovo tribes are usually interpreted as Ugrian-speaking (proto-Hungarian). "It is highly probable that the Gorokhovo culture is more closely related to the pre-Hungarian heritage than the Sargat culture."

The culture had fortified settlements, probably aimed at protecting the metallurgical resources of the Urals.

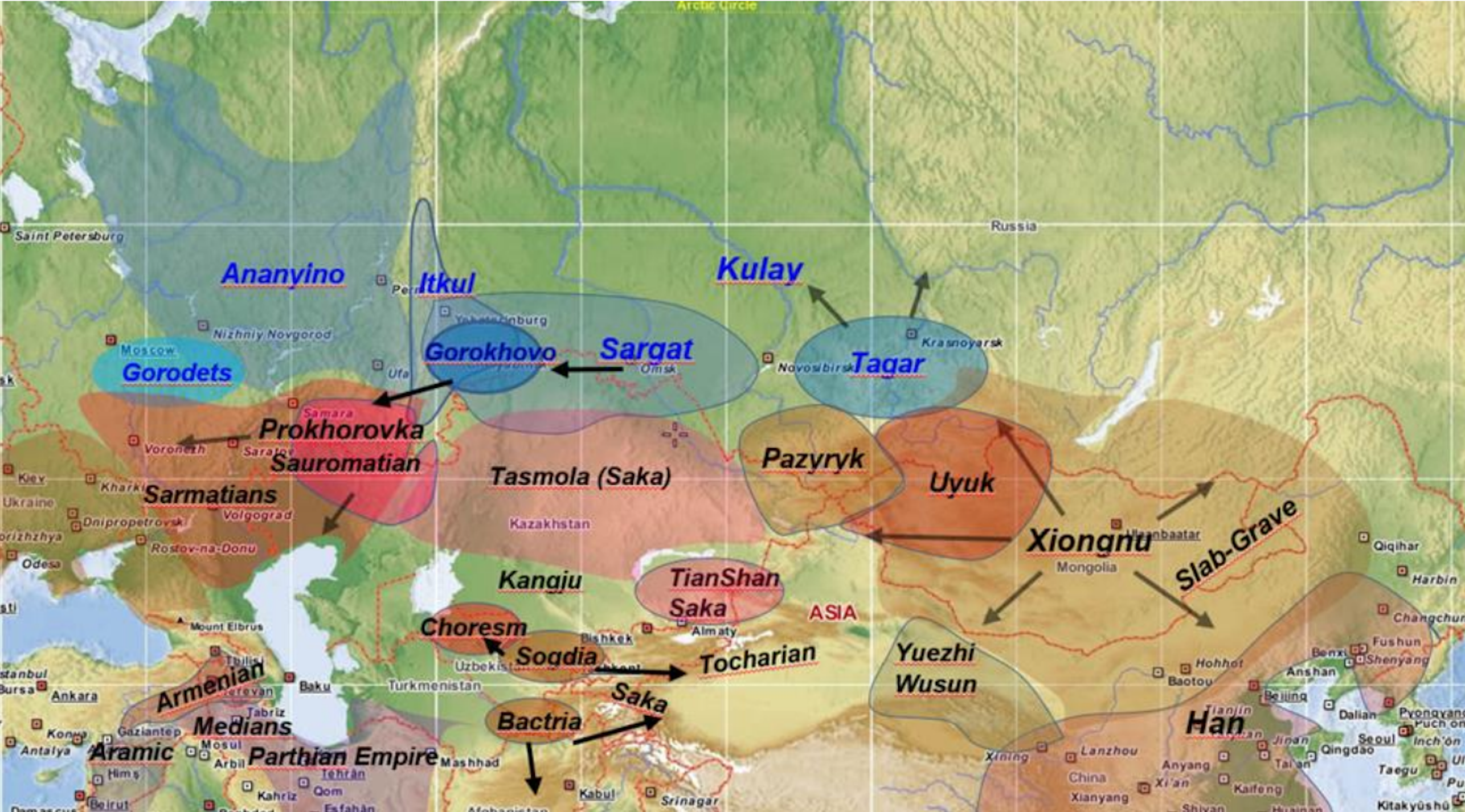
The Gorokhovo culture and Eurasian archaeological cultures in the Iron Age (ca. 800–100 BCE) with their approximate ranges. Cultures in the Seima-Turbino zone are indicated with blue letters.

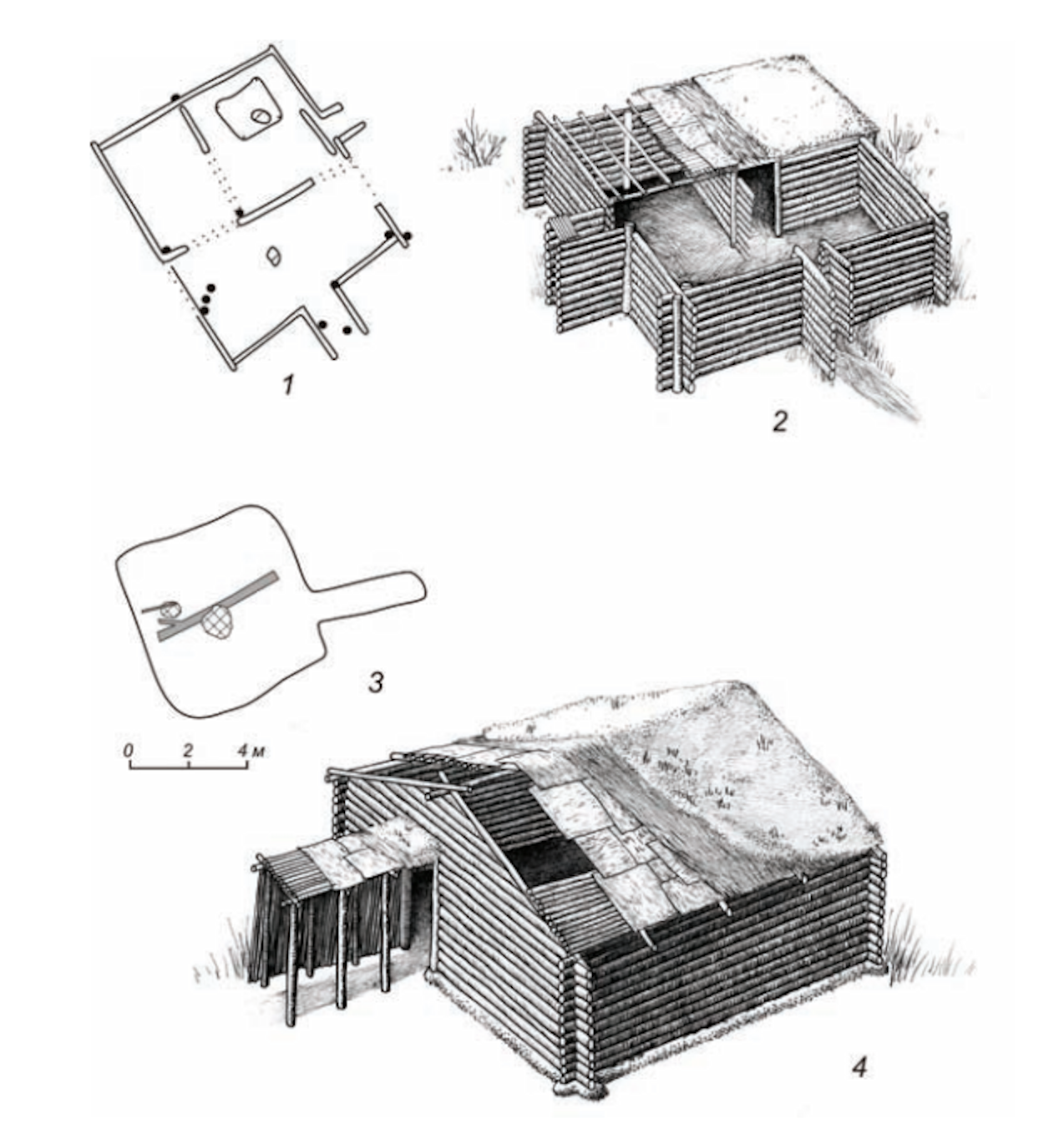
Gorokhovo culture, Vorobyovo hillfort (1, 2) and Katayskoe settlement (3, 4).
