= Kulay culture =

Archaeological culture in Siberia

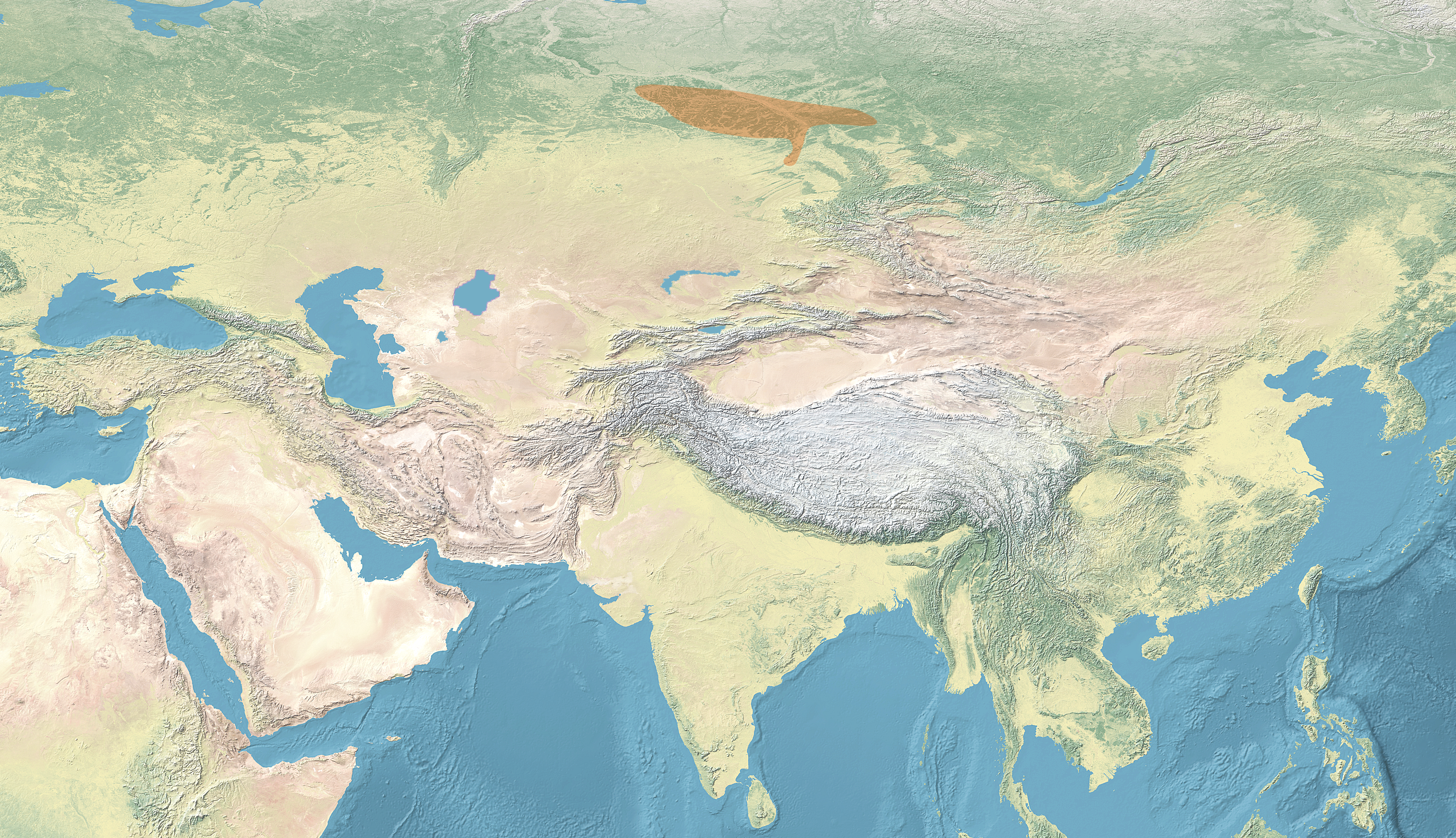
- Location of the Kulay culture, with contemporary cultures in the 5th century BCE
- Geographical range: West Siberia
- Period: Late Bronze Age, early Iron Age
- Dates: 1st millennium BCE
- Preceded by: Beloyarsk culture Kalinkino culture Molchanovo culture
- Followed by: Potschevash culture Ryolka culture Karym culture

Map of Kulay culture (orange) and Sargat culture (green).

The Kulay culture was a culture of the Siberian forests during the 1st millennium BCE, in the northern taiga zone of the Ob River basin. They used bronze and related basic iron technologies, and their designs were related to the animal style of the steppes. Their pottery had sophisticated stamp decoration.

The Kulai culture was located just north of the Saka Sargat culture and Tasmola culture.

Anthropomorphological studies indicated both Caucasoid and Mongoloid components among human remains affiliated with the Kulay culture.
