= Semiyarka =

Late Bronze Age settlement in north-eastern Kazakhstan

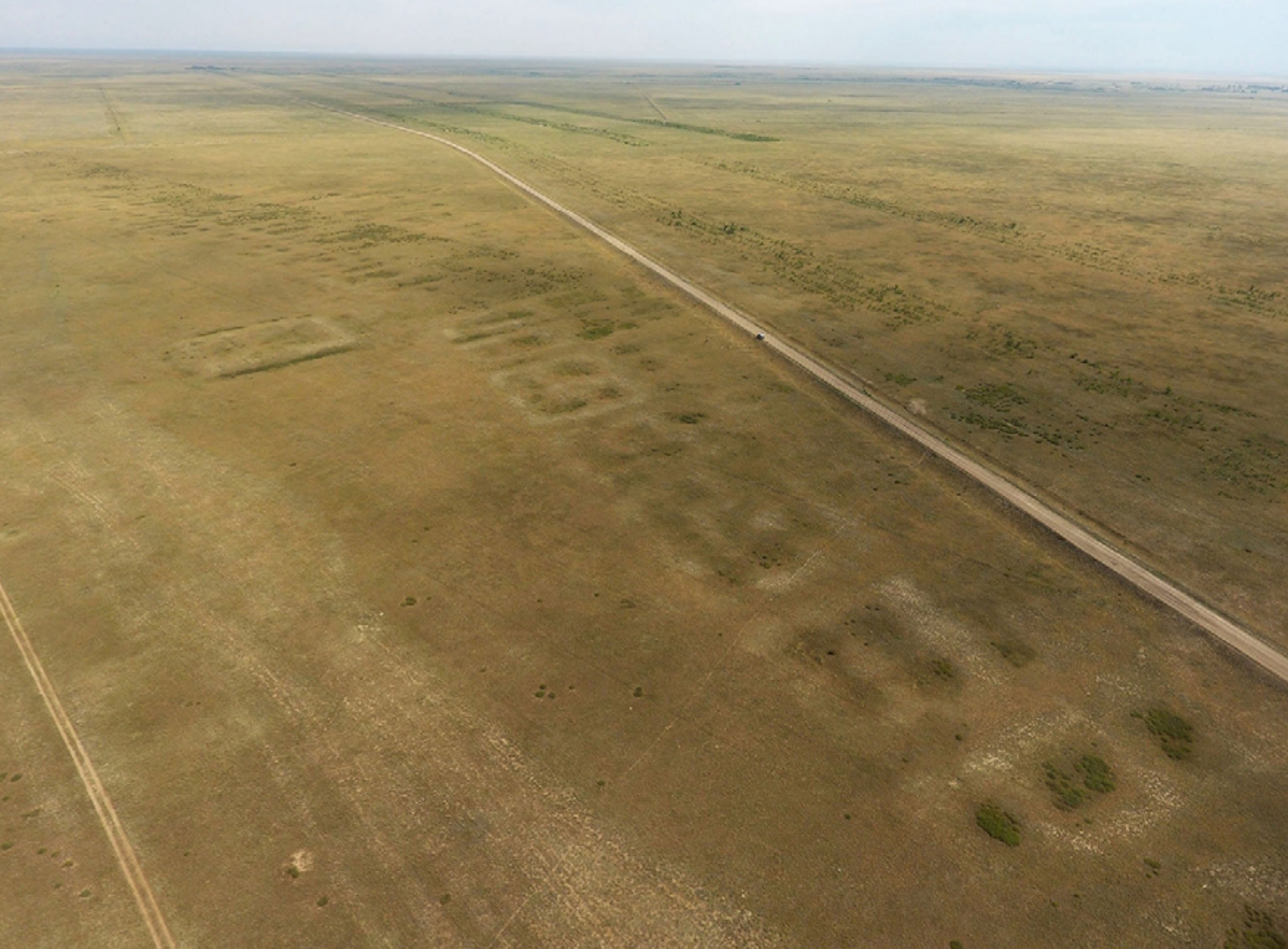
- Drone photograph of the archaeological site of Semiyarka, looking from the south-east to the north-west, taken in July 2018

- Location within Continental Asia Location within Kazakhstan
- 50.894012°N 78.375433°E

Semiyarka is a Late Bronze Age settlement in Abai Oblast in north-eastern Kazakhstan, which was occupied from around 1600 BCE. It is connected to the Cherkaskul culture (1600–1250 BCE) and Alekseevka-Sargary culture (1500–1100 BCE), a subdivision of the Andronovo culture. The site includes monumental architecture, and evidence of pottery as well as tin-bronze production. The copper and tin ores used for the production of the Semiyarka artifacts probably originated from the Altai Mountains in East Kazakhstan.

Semiyarka may have been a "Bronze Age metropolis", and is one of the rare known sites of tin bronze production in the Eurasian steppe.

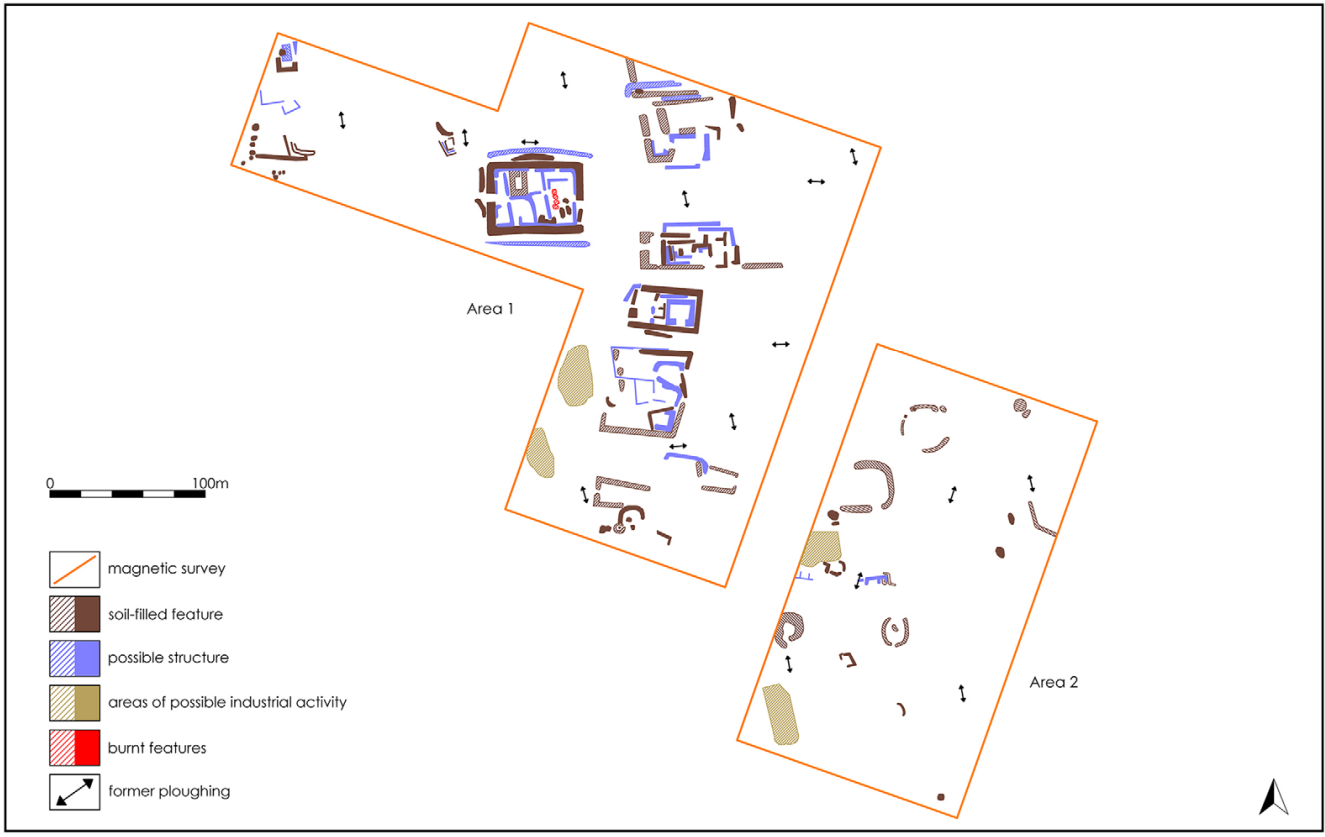
Semiyarka map of features identified through geophysical prospection

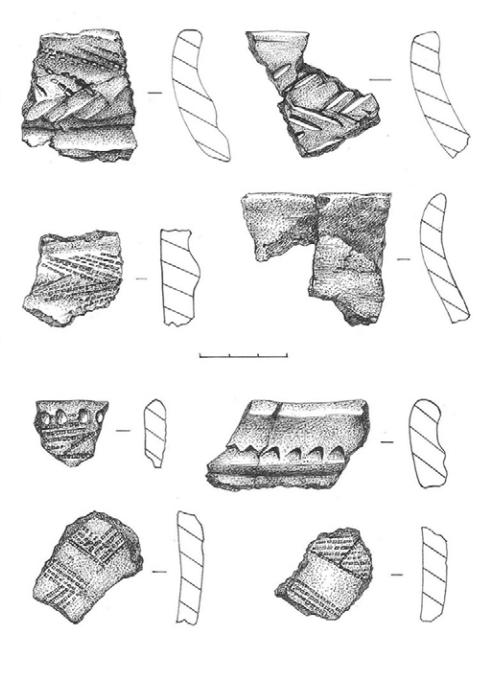
Semiyarka pottery sherds. Alekseevka-Sargary (upper four sherds) and Cherkaskul (lower four sherds) cultures

== Sources ==
- Radivojević, Miljana; Lawrence, Dan; Merz, Victor K.; Merz, Ilya V.; Demidkova, Elena; Woolston-Houshold, Mark; Villis, Richie; Brown, Peter J. (18 November 2025). "A major city of the Kazakh Steppe? Investigating Semiyarka's Bronze Age legacy". Antiquity: 1–9. doi:10.15184/aqy.2025.10244.
- Nicioli, Taylor (18 November 2025). "Archaeologists may have uncovered a Bronze Age metropolis in Kazakhstan's steppe". CNN.
