= Filippovka kurgans =

Coordinates: 51.342968°N 54.116974°E

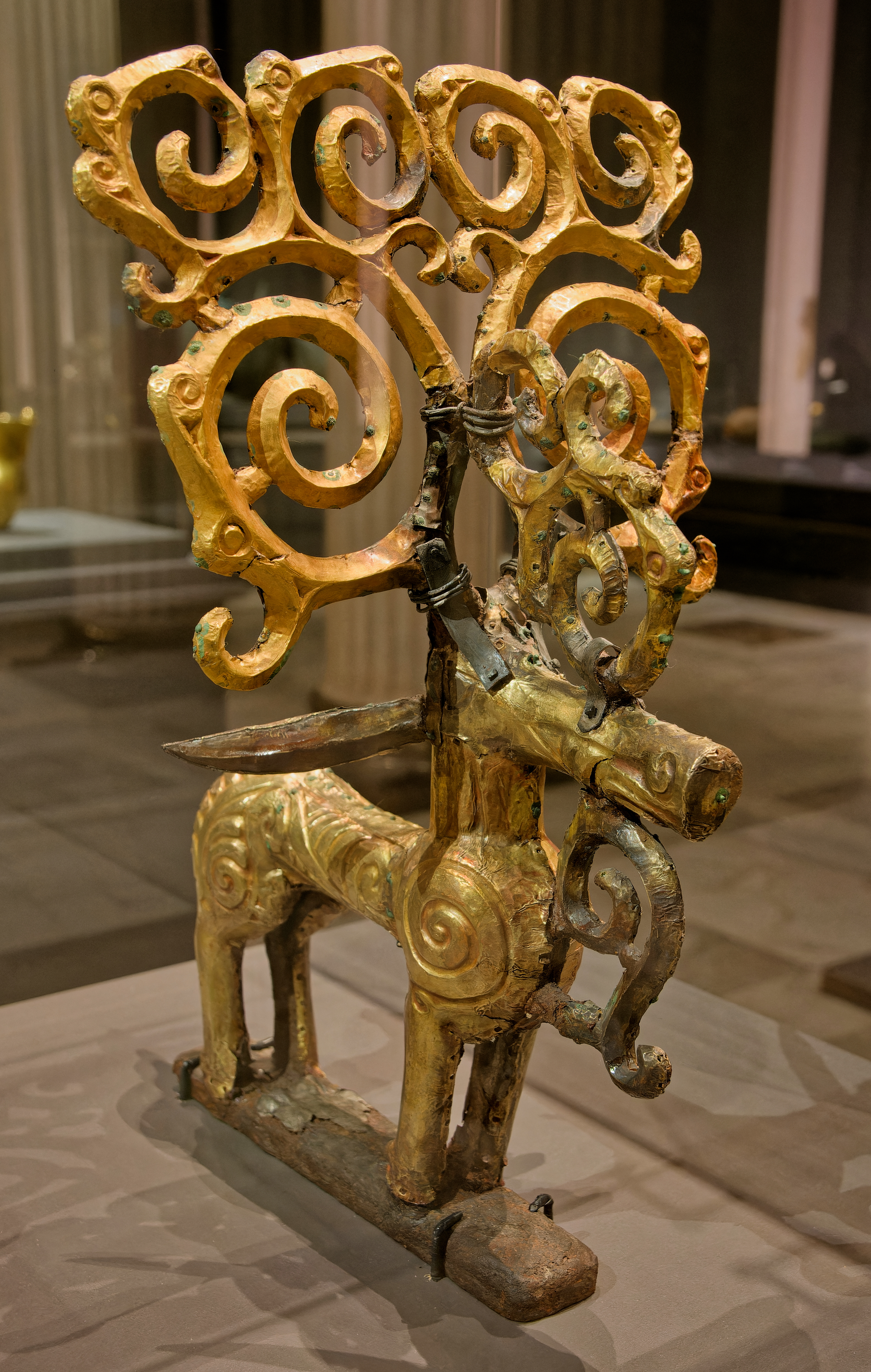
- Two-planed stag, Filippovka kurgan, 4th century BCE.

Location
- Location of the Filippovka kurgans and contemporary cultures circa 325 BCE

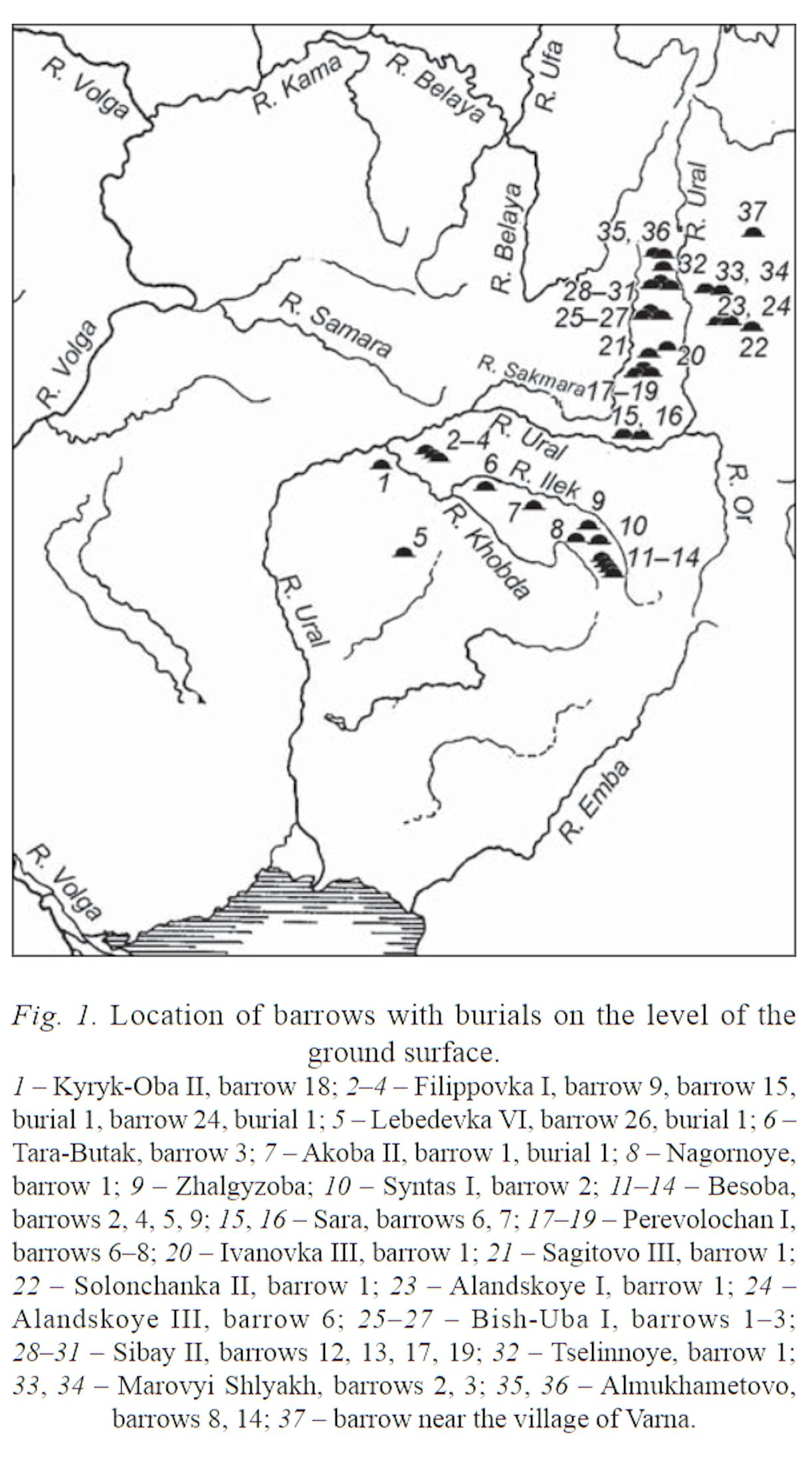
The Filippovka kurgans are part of numerous nomadic South Ural barrows dating from 6th-4th century BCE.

The Filippovka kurgans (Ru: Филипповский курганный) are Late-Sauromatian to Early-Sarmatian culture kurgans, forming "a transition site between the Sauromation and the Sarmatian epochs", just north of the Caspian Sea in the Orenburg region of Russia, dated to the second half of the 5th century and the 4th century BCE (that is, from the 450-300 BCE period).

== Characteristics ==
The style of the artifacts from the Filippovka kurgans is considered as Scythian Animal Style. Some of the artifacts having Achaemenid stylistic elements, it has been suggested that they were made by Achaemenid craftsmen by order from Filippovka nomads.

The numerous burials at Filippovka are dated to the 2nd half of the 5th century and the 4th century (c.450-300 BCE), and correspond to the Early Sarmatian culture of the southern Ural region.

The style of many artifacts looks quite archaic, prompting some historians to date them to the 6th century BCE and to the Sauromatian (pre-Sarmatian) period (ca. 600-400 BCE), but detailed analysis confirms dates of c.450-300 BCE for all the Filippovka kurgan, representing a transitory phase between the Sauromatians and the Earliest Sarmatians.

The finds of weaponry in the Filippovka kurgans also allowed for the definition of the Early Sarmatian heavy-armed warrior: "He wore a forged-iron helmet with a nose piece and cheek pieces. Scale armor of leather protected his body. He carried a twig-woven quiver for a bow and sometimes more than 200 arrows, covered with leather and decorated with an umbo; an arms belt with a buckle for crossing the belts; a richly decorated quiver hook; a long spear with a massive head and spike; a short iron akinakes sword; and iron axe. This complete image recalls a picture from a novel featuring medieval western European knights; these Sarmatian "prototypes," however, are 2,000 years older".

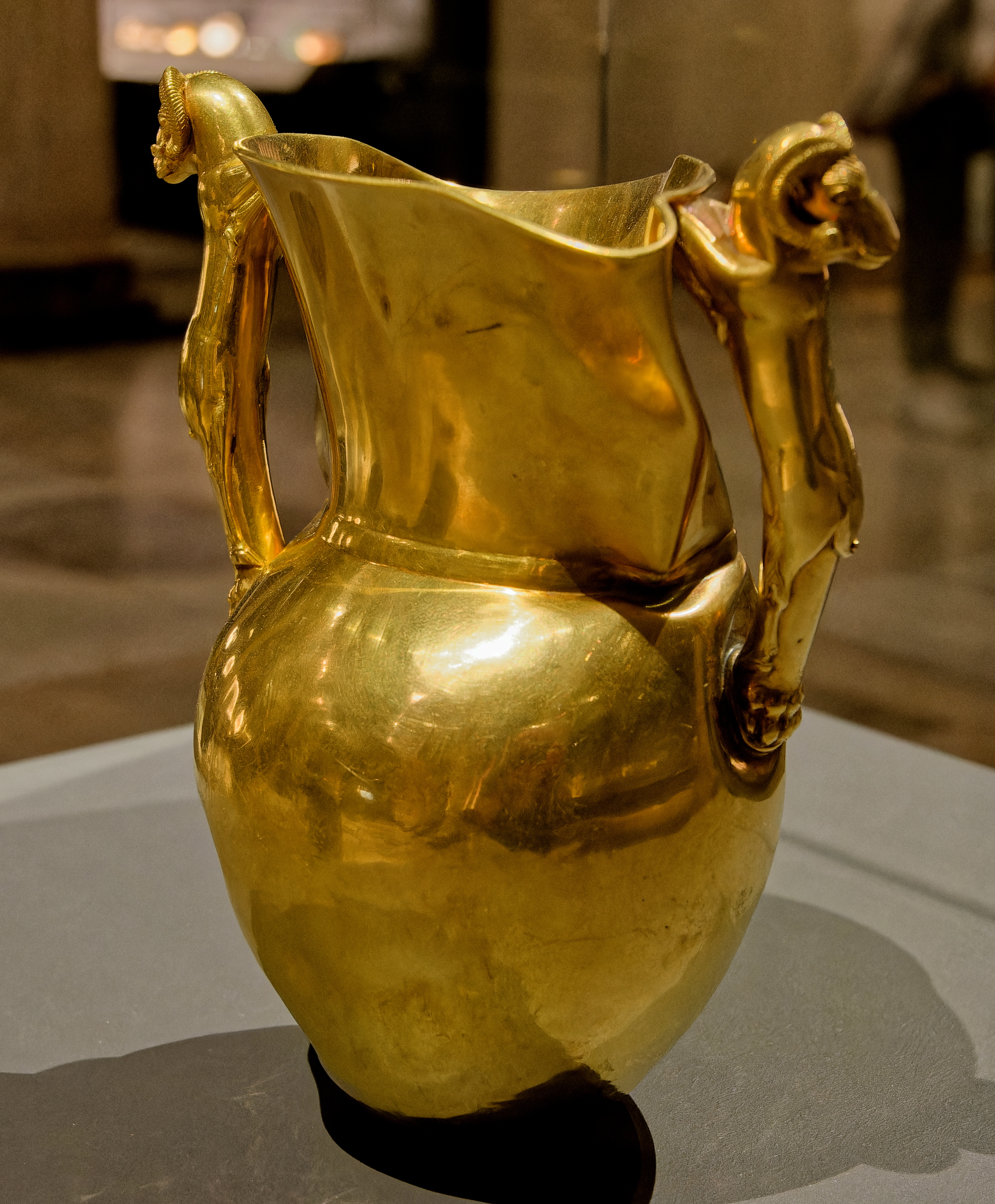
Gold amphora with argali-shaped handles, Filippovka kurgan 1, 4th century BCE.

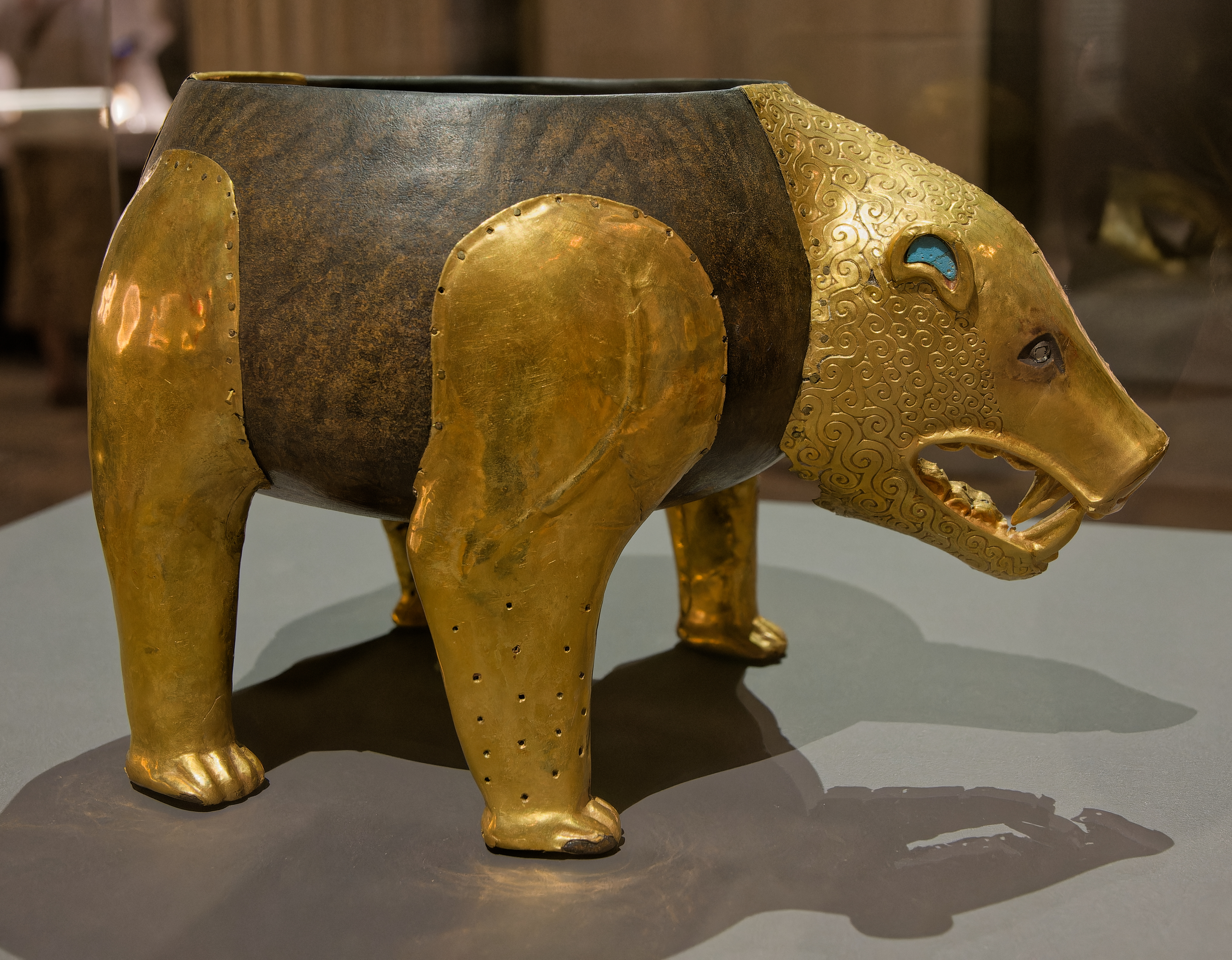
Bear-shaped vessel, Filippovka kurgan 1, 4th century BCE.

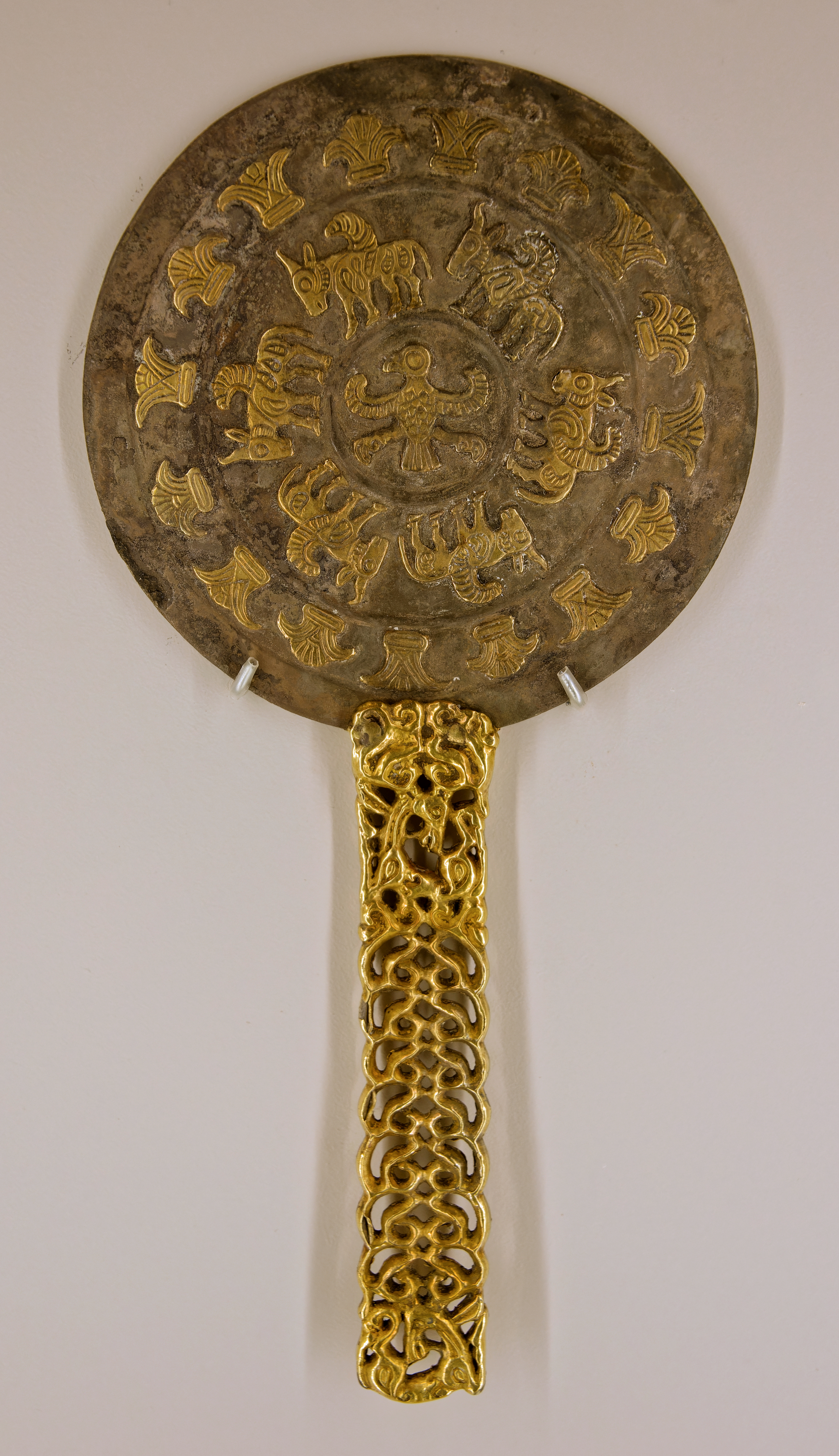
Mirror, Filippovka kurgan 1, 4th century BCE.

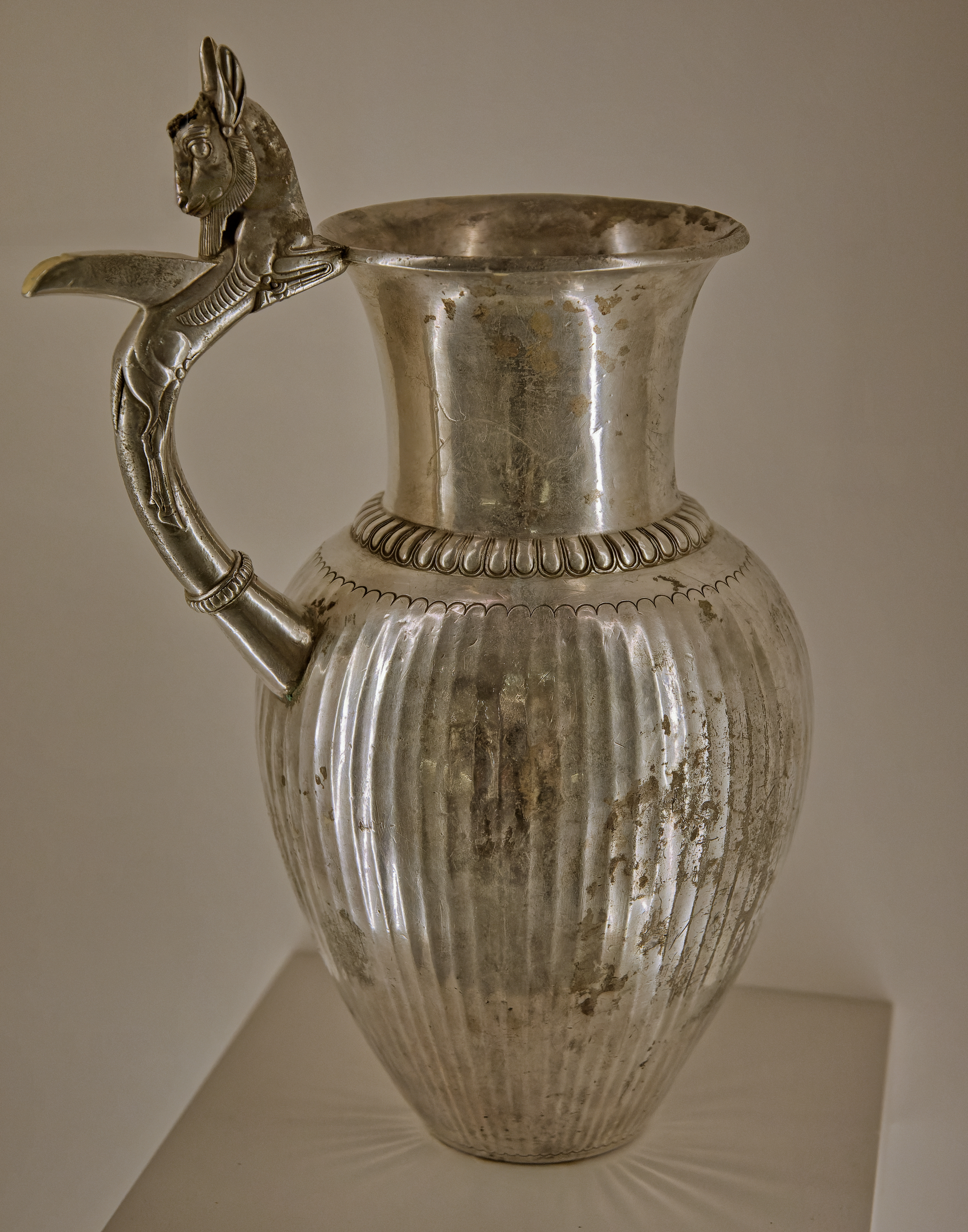
Silver ewer, Filippovka kurgan 1, 4th century BCE.

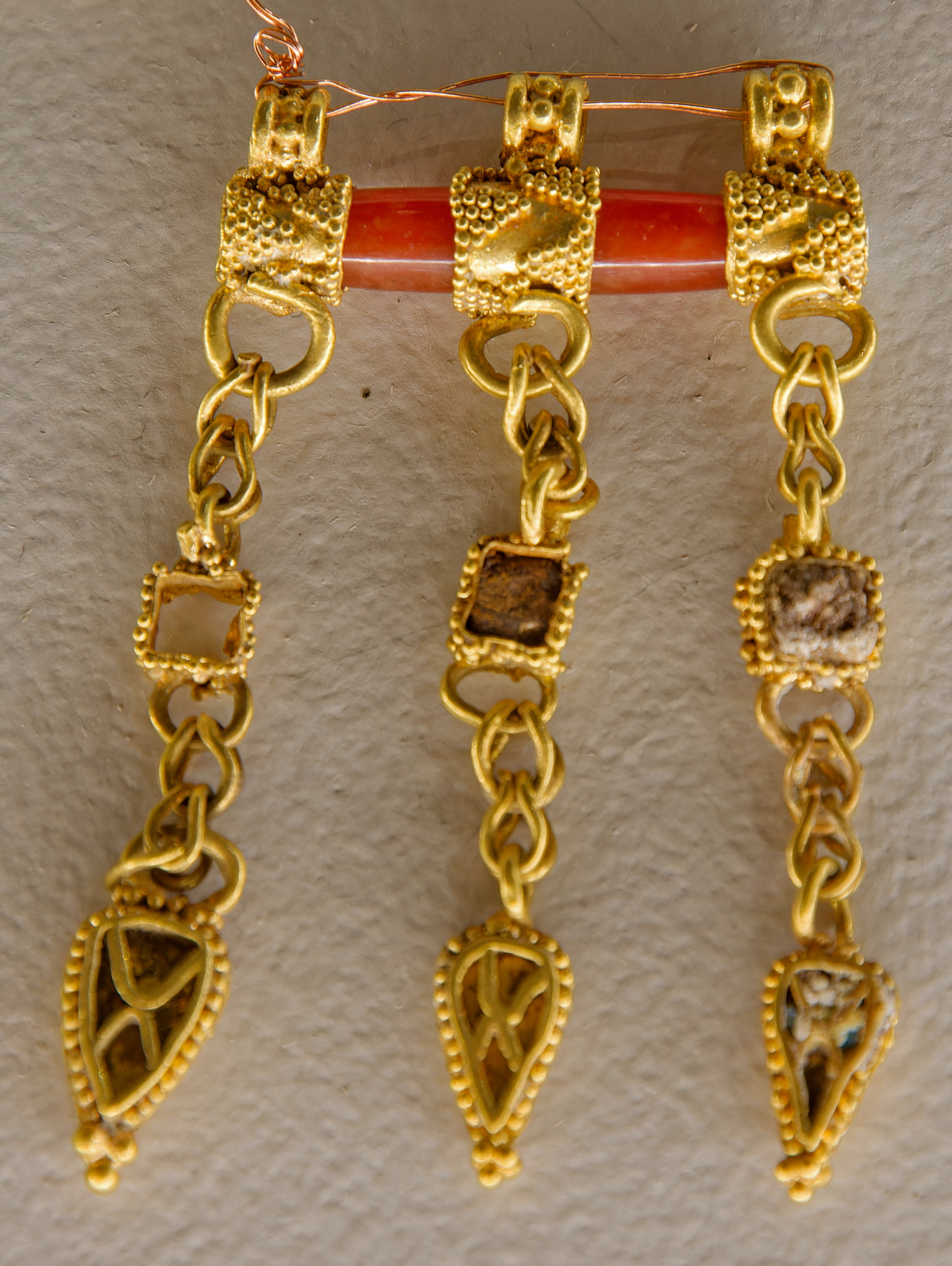
Earrings, Filippovka kurgan 1, 4th century BCE.

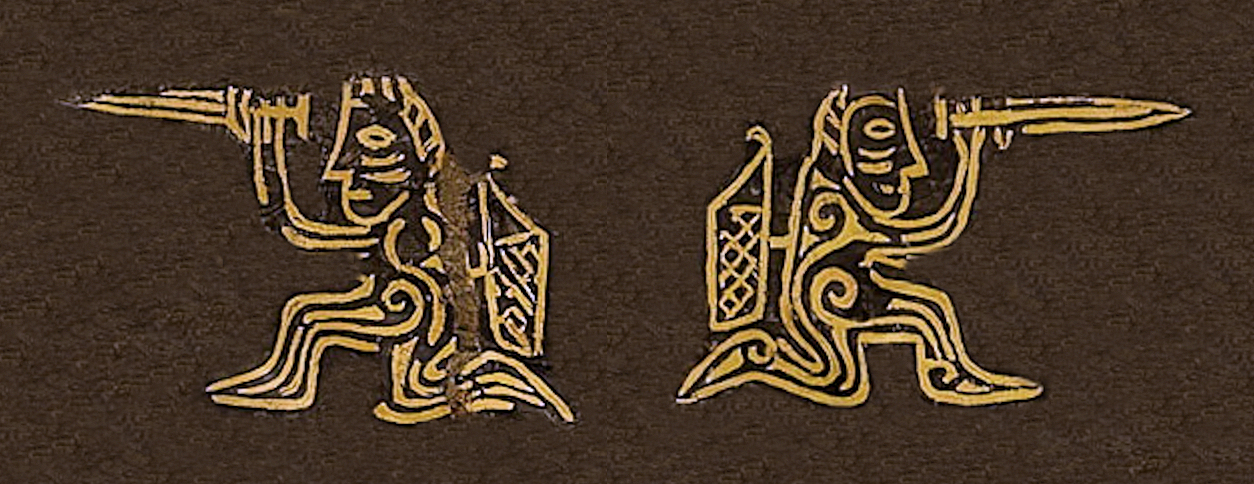
Warriors with daggers and bows. Dagger blade decoration from Kurgan 4, Burial 2, Filippovka.

=== Weapons ===
Numerous weapons, armour, helmets were found in the excavations of Filippovka kurgan 1:

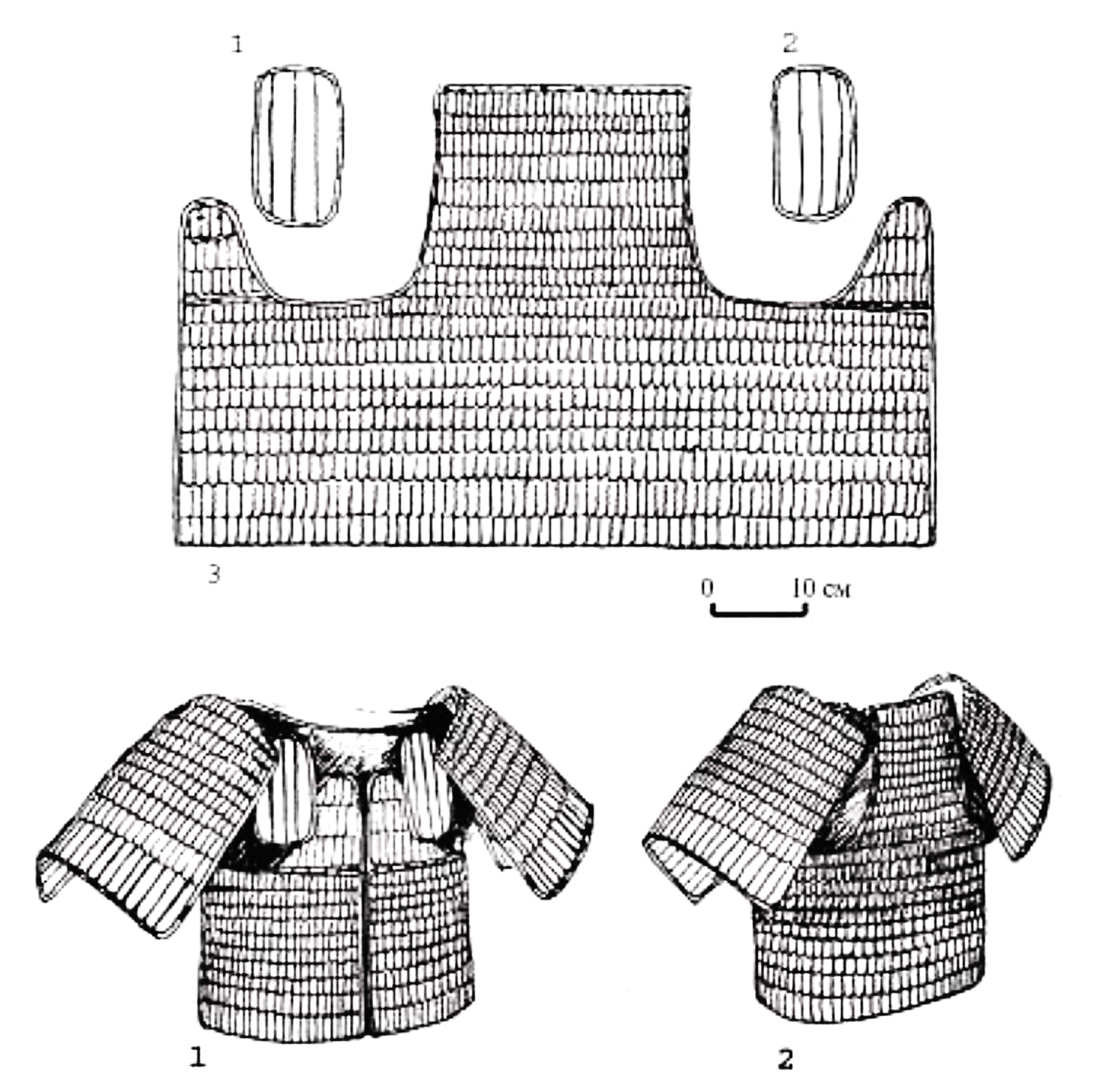
Filippovka 1 Iron armour from burial 2 mound 4

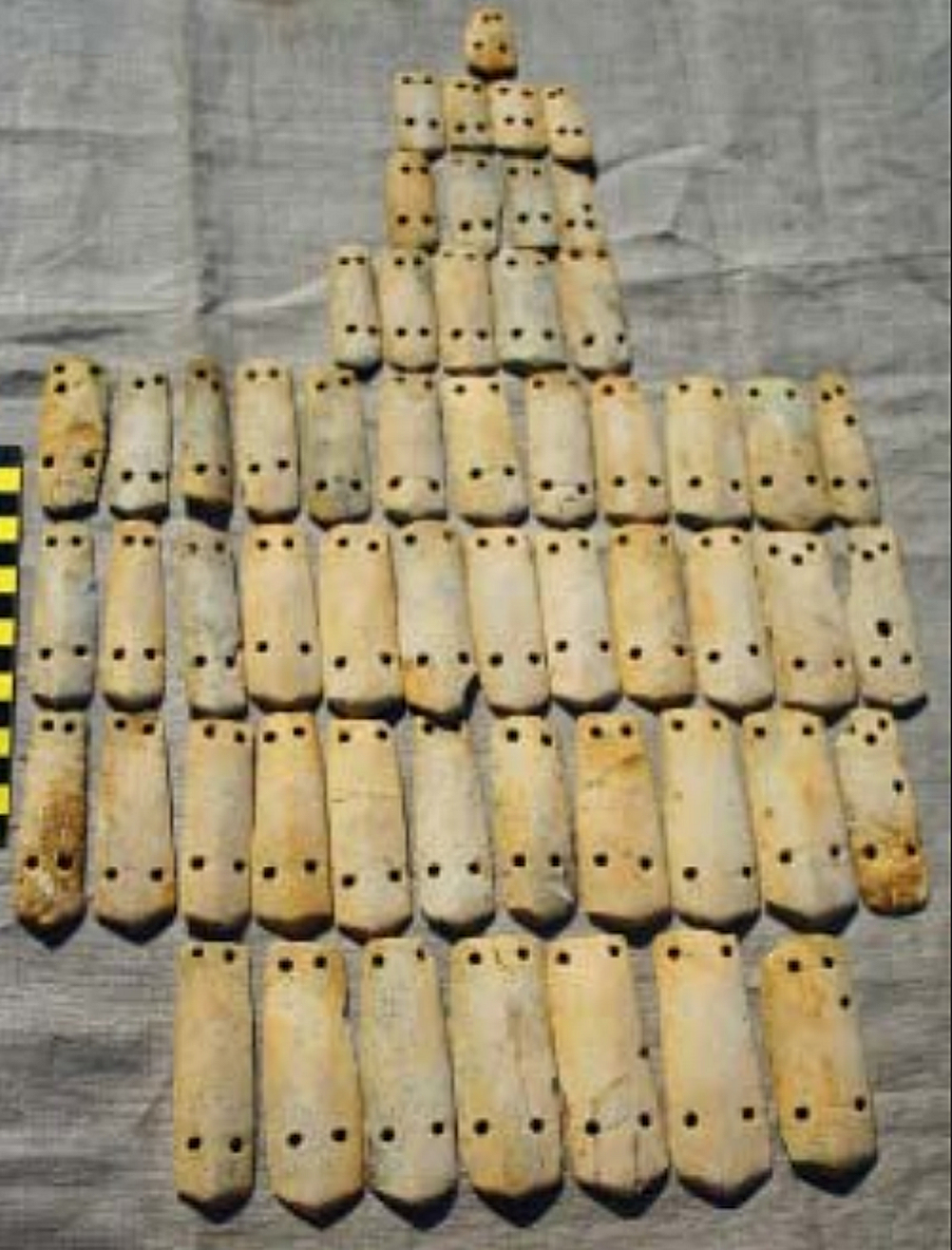
Filippovka 1, Horn armour from mound 29

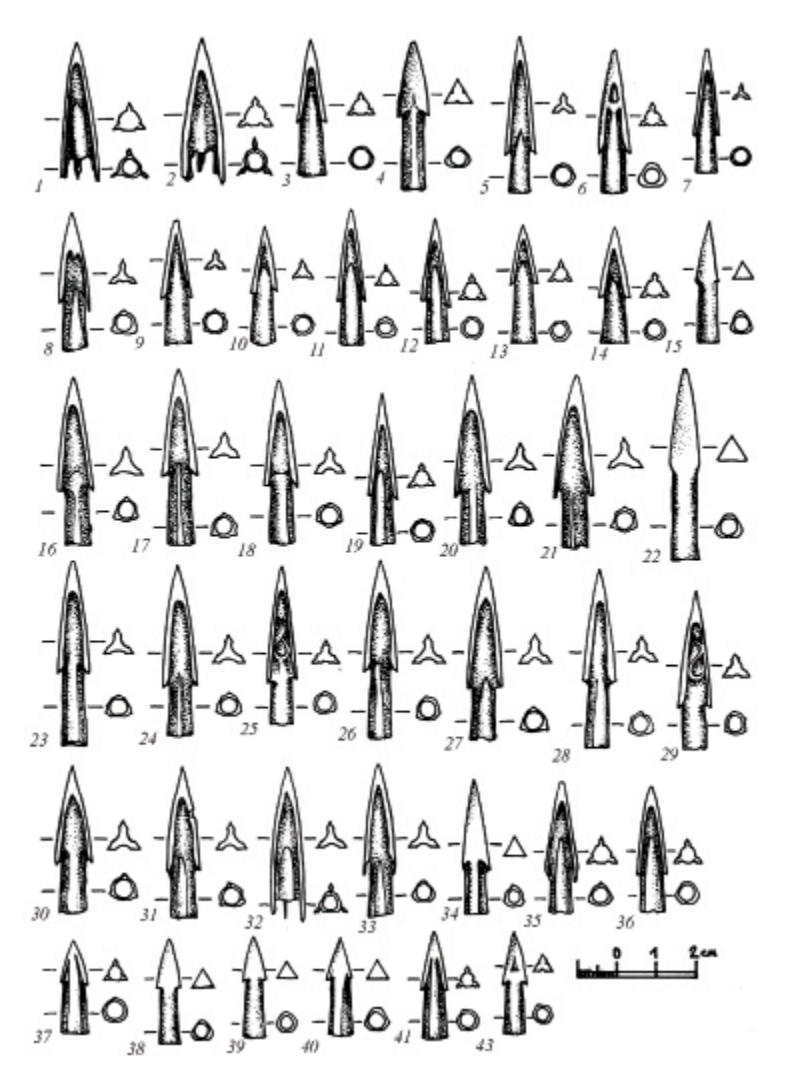
Filippovka 1, bronze arrowheads from burial 2, mound 4

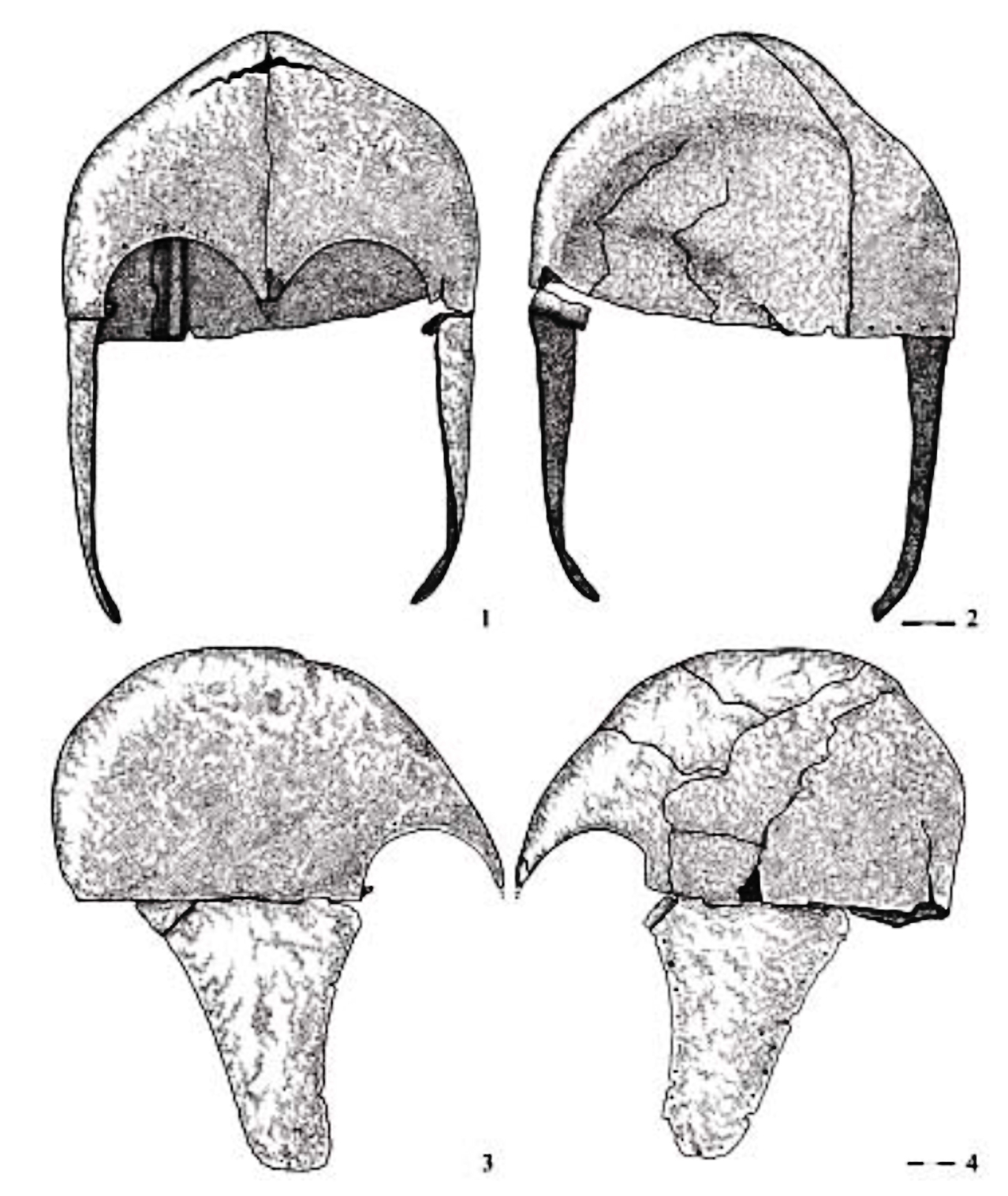
Filippovka 1, iron helmets from mound 11

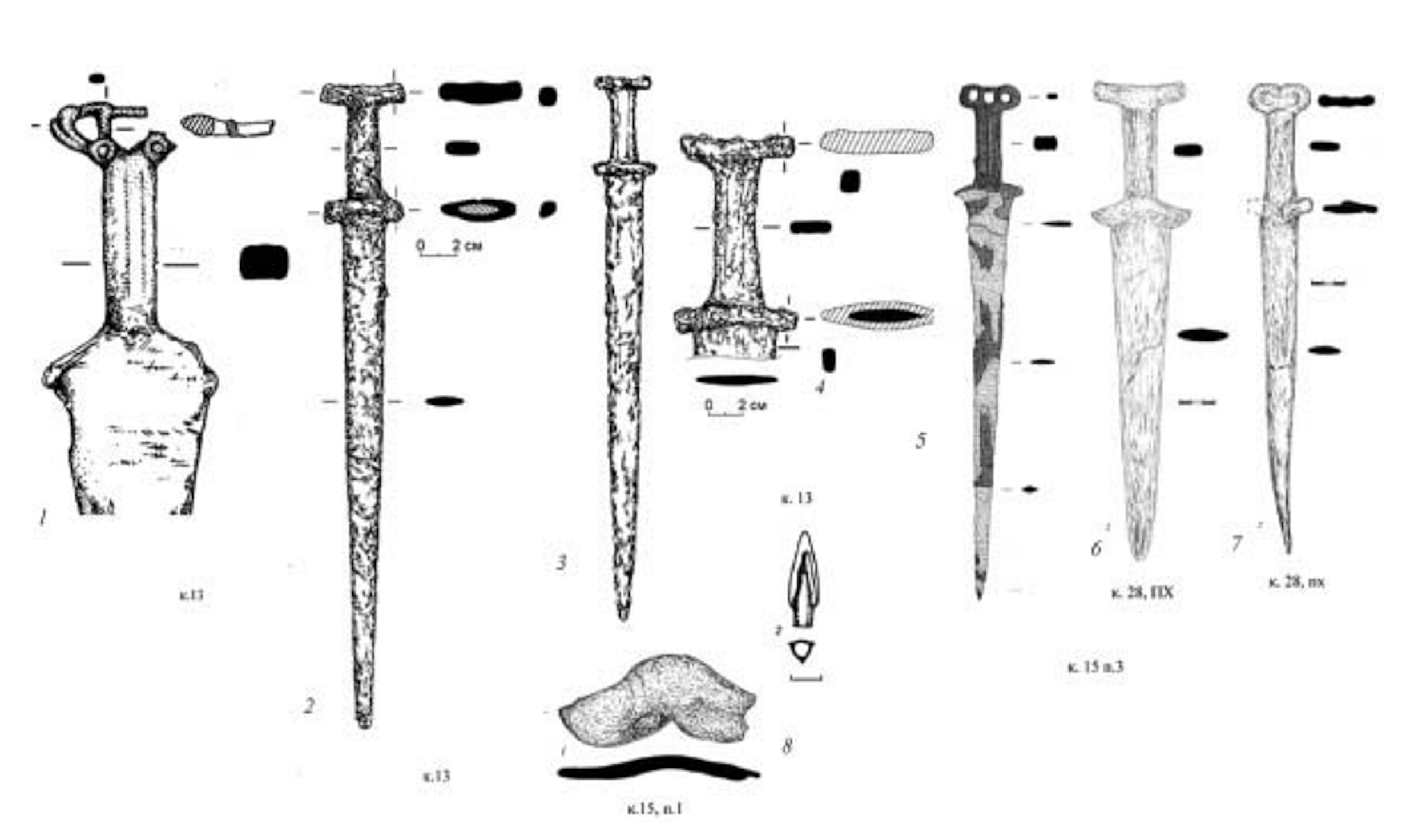
Filippovka 1, iron swords and daggers

== Anthropology ==
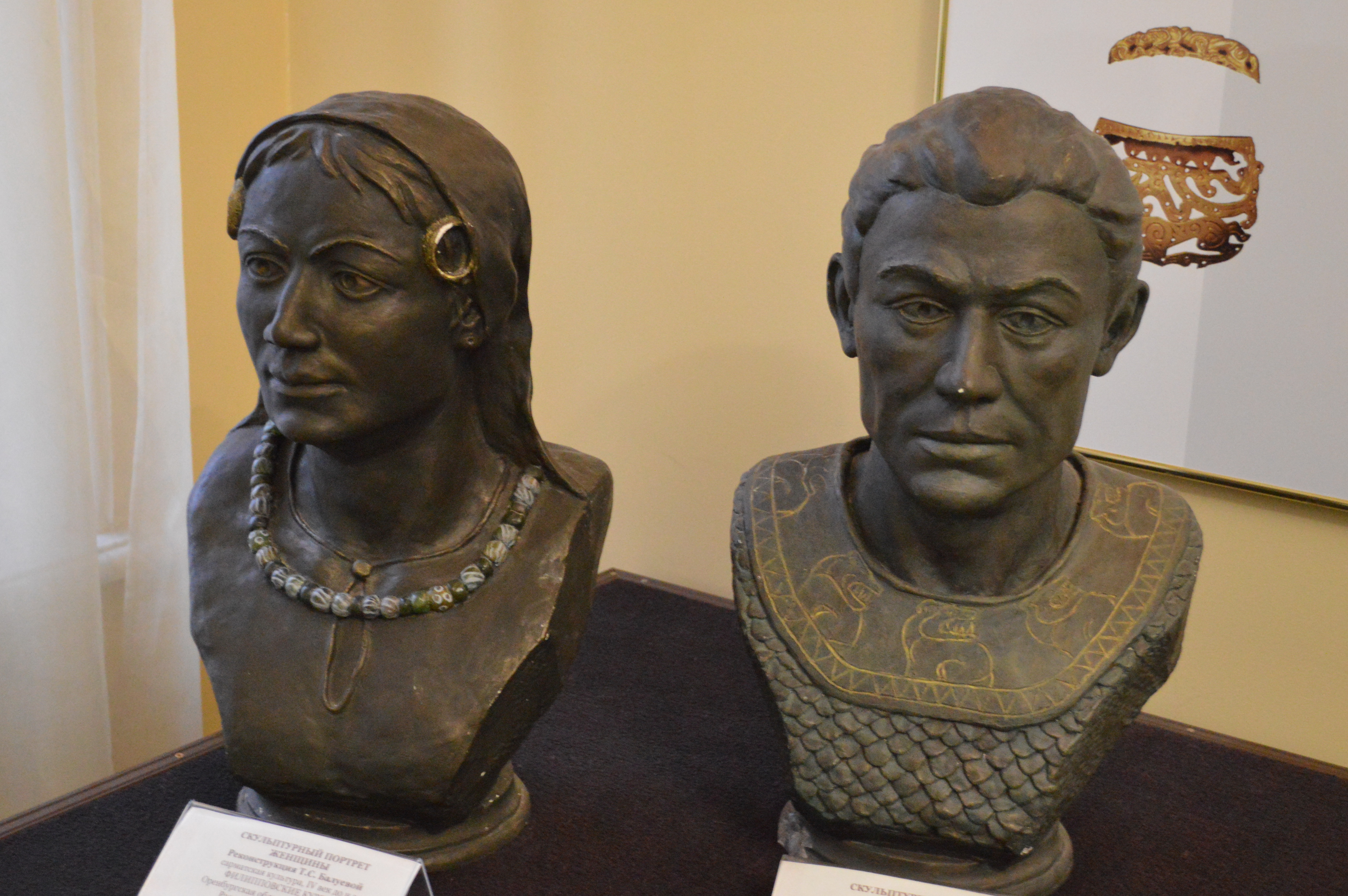
Facial reconstruction of female and male from Filippovka 12 kurgan

The people buried in Filippovka are described as being "basically European" with some Asiatic features in the nasal and facial bones. Compared with classical Sauromatians, Early Sarmatians, such as those of Filippovka, generally display an increased incidence of eastern Asiatic features. They most closely resembled the Saka populations of Central Asia, particularly from the Altai region (Pazyryk), and were very different from the western Scythians, or the Sarmatians of the Volga River area to the west:

In skull shape and facial structure, the Filippovka specimens differ considerably from remains of Scythians and Volga River-area Sarmatians. The Filipovka skulls most closely resemble those of Saka from Kazakhstan and the Aral Sea region, and those of the Usuns from Eastern Kazhakhstan.

— The Golden Deer of Eurasia: Scythian and Sarmatian Treasures from the Russian Steppes.

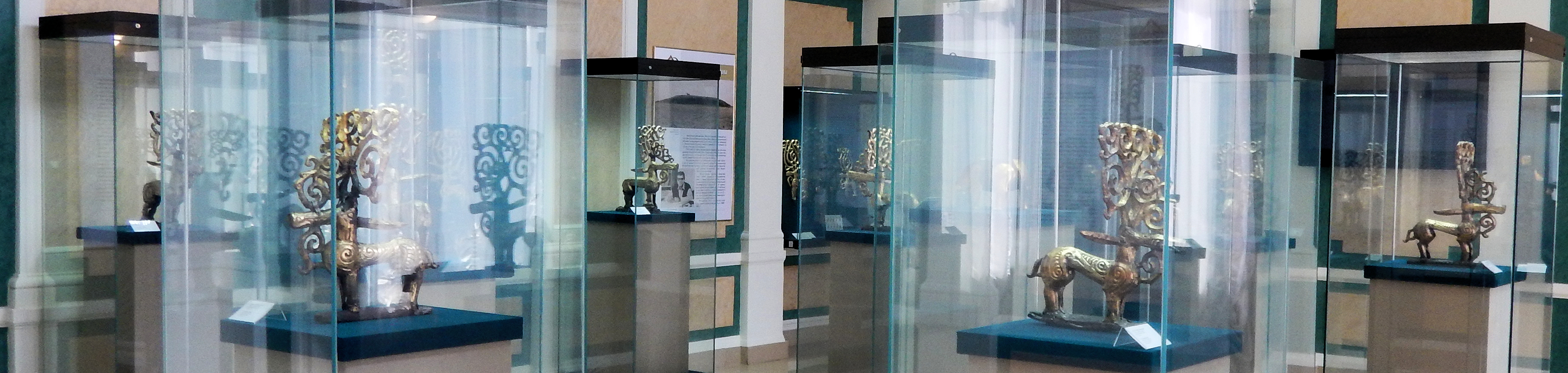
Stags from the Filippovka kurgans, Ufa Ethnology Museum. 26 such golden deers were excavated in Filippovka. They were carved from wood and covered with gold or silver foil.

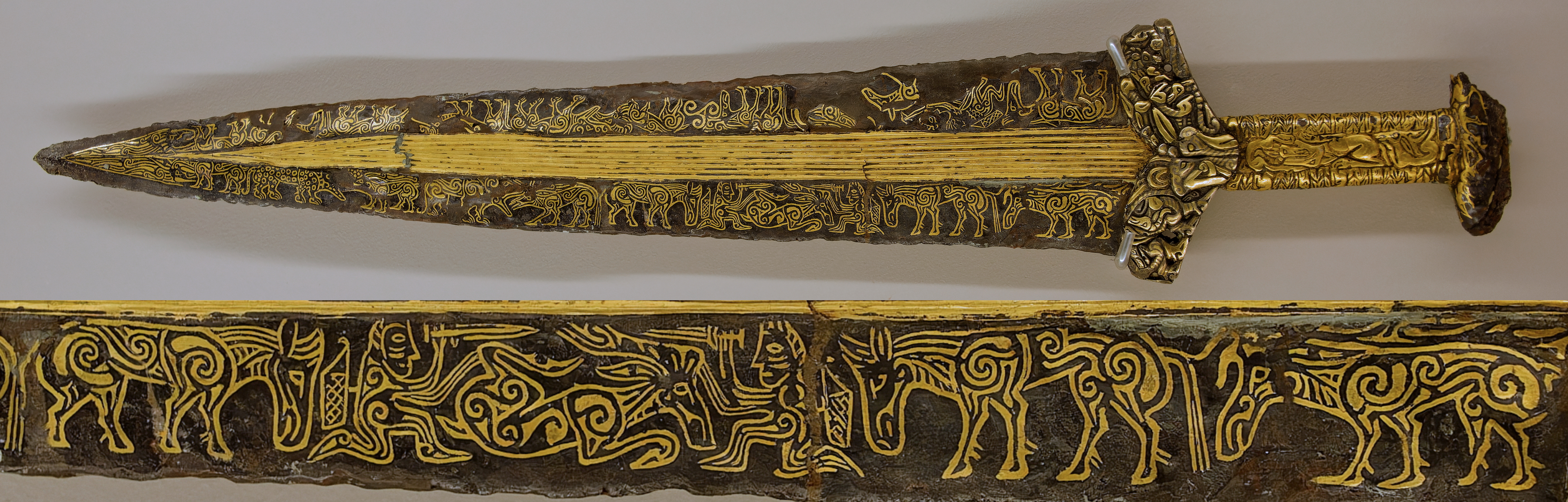
Gilded iron sword, with gold inlay designs of horses and warriors, from Kurgan 4, Burial 2. Gold inlays to decorate iron and bronze objects were used by the nomads of Eurasia from the 7th century BCE, starting with the battle axe and the arrowheads found at Arzhan-2 in the Altai region.

=== Ethnic context ===
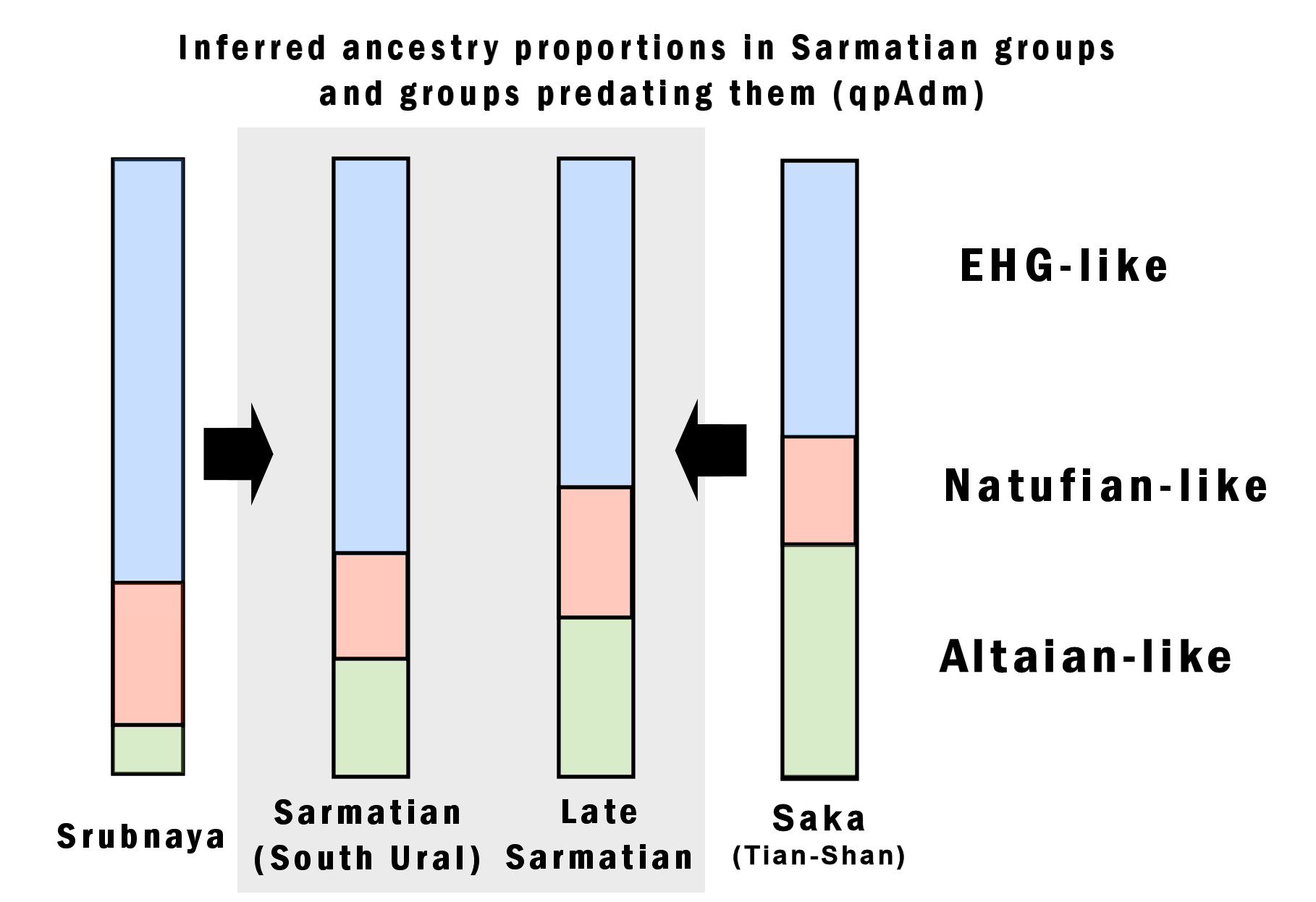
Sarmatian ancestry proportions. The Late Sauromatian to late Sarmatian periods saw an infrease in (Altaian-like ancestry).

The region between the Caspian Sea and of the Southern Urals originally had populations of Srubnaya (1900 BC–1200 BCE) and Andronovo (c. 2000–1150 BCE) ancestry. From the 7th century BCE, Early Saka nomads started to settle in the Southern Urals, coming from Central Asia, the Altai-Sayan region, and Central and Northern Kazakhstan. The Itkul culture (7th-5th century BCE) is one of these Early Saka cultures, based in the eastern foothills of the Urals, which was assimilited into the Early Sarmatian culture. Circa 600 BCE, groups from the Saka Tasmola culture settled in the southern Urals. Circa 500 BCE, other groups from the area of Ancient Khorezm settled in the western part of the southern Urals, who also assimilated into the Early Sarmatians.

As a result, a large-scale integrated union of nomads from Central Asia formed in the area in the 5th–4th century BCE, with fairly uniformized burial customs which may have originated with the Filippovka culture.

== See also ==
- Taksai kurgan, about 100 km to the west
- Araltobe kurgan

== Sources ==
- Okorokov, Konstantin; Tregubov, Vyacheslav (June 2021). "About Women's Clothing with Decorated Sleeves from the Filippovka I Kurgan Cemetery (CC BY 4.0)". Nizhnevolzhskiy Arheologicheskiy Vestnik (я): 51–68. doi:10.15688/nav.jvolsu.2021.1.4.
- Okorokov, Konstantin (June 2022). "Items of Clothing from the Early Nomadic Kurgans in the Southern Urals: Iconography and Burial Practice (Based on the Materials of Cemeteries Filippovka 1 and Filippovka 2) (CC BY 4.0)". Nizhnevolzhskiy Arheologicheskiy Vestnik (1): 66–90. doi:10.15688/nav.jvolsu.2022.1.4.
- Okorokov, Konstantin; Perevodchikova, Elena (July 2020). "The 2013 Finds in the Context of the Animal Style of the Kurgan 1 of the Necropolis Filippovka 1 (CC BY 4.0)". Nizhnevolzhskiy Arheologicheskiy Vestnik (1): 28–45. doi:10.15688/nav.jvolsu.2020.1.2.
- Anikeeva, Olga; Kolganova, Galina (July 2020). "Jewellery from Burial 2 Kurgan 1 Filippovka 1 Cemetery: Manufacturing Techniques, Purpose and Semantics of Images (CC BY 4.0)". Nizhnevolzhskiy Arheologicheskiy Vestnik (1): 6–27. doi:10.15688/nav.jvolsu.2020.1.1.
