= Mezhovskaya culture =

Bronze Age archaeological culture in the Southern Urals

- The Mezhovskaya culture and contemporary cultures c. 1000 BC
- Geographical range: Eurasian steppe
- Period: Bronze Age
- Dates: XIII cent. b.c. - VII cent. b.c.
- Preceded by: the local variant Andronovo culture and Cherkaskul culture
- Followed by: Itkul culture, Sauromatians

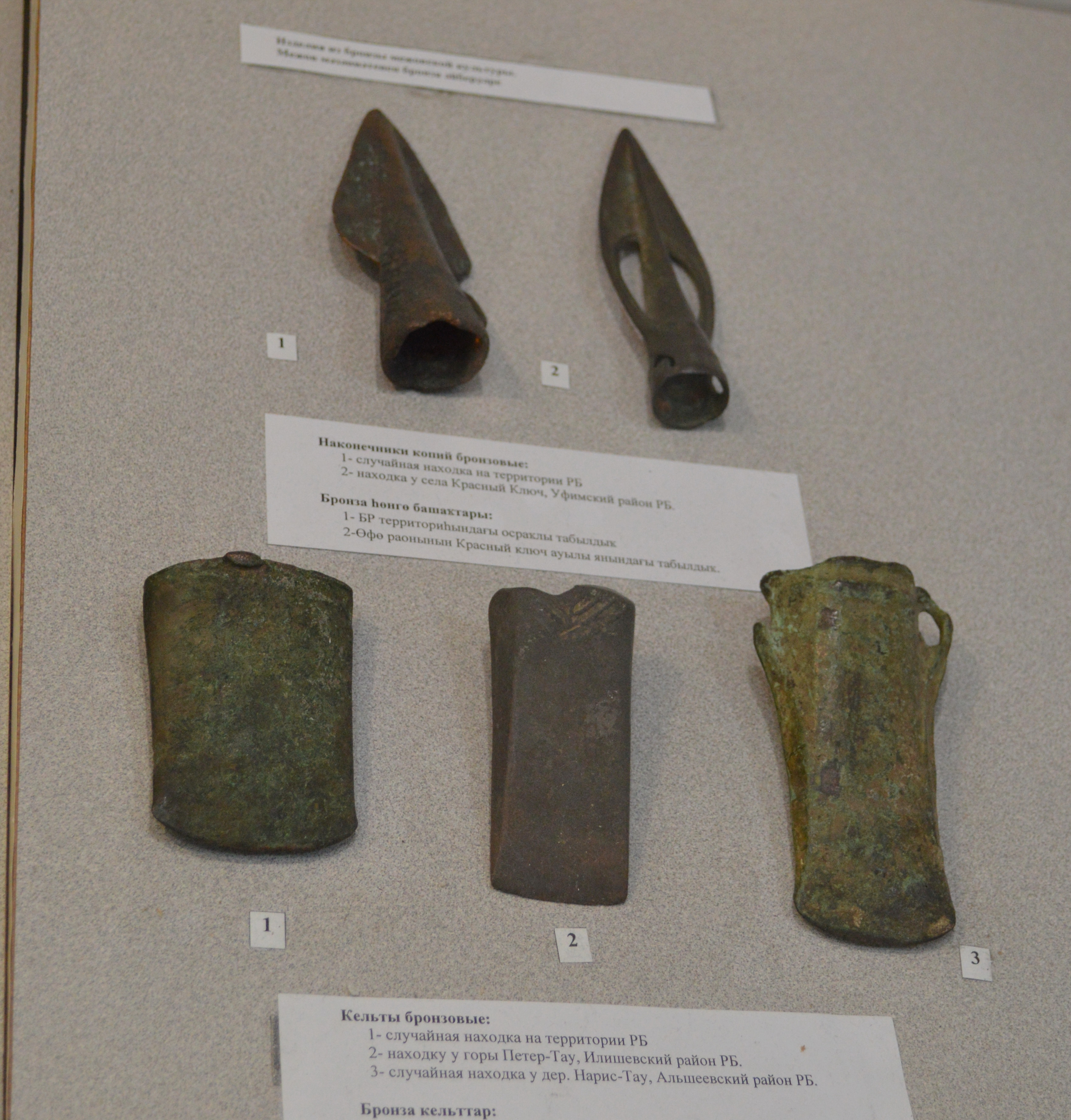
Mezhovskaya culture spearheads and celts

The Mezhovskaya culture (mistranscribed as Meshovskaya culture) is an archaeological culture of the late Bronze Age (13th to the beginning of the 7th century BCE). It was localized in the Southern Urals and named after the village of Mezhovka on the banks of the Bagaryak river in the northern part of the Chelyabinsk Oblast.

The ancestors of the Mezhovskaya culture were the people of the Cherkaskul culture with the participation of the people of the Tobol taiga, with traditions and ceramics of the steppe zone of the Ural and Kazakhstan (Andronovo culture), especially the Sargarino-Alexis culture.

The Mezhovskaya culture reflects the further stages of development of the Ugric community in active contact with the Indo-Iranian population of the Ural steppes.

== Stages ==
The Mezhovskaya culture developed through two stages:

- The Mezhovsky stage (13th-9th centuries b.c.)
- The Berezovsky stage (8th-7th century b.c.).

== The dwellings ==
Dwellings were excavated at Mezhovka, Kapova cave, Berezovka and other locations. The dwellings were unfortified with an area of 1 - 35 sq. m., and were more likely to occur in the forest-steppe of the Urals, and rarely in the Ural forests proper. The number of dwellings ranged from 1 to 10–15. They were usually shallow huts built with frame-pillar design.

The Mezhovsky culture had a diversified economy with a combination of production (especially cattle, metal) and assigns (hunting, fishing, gathering) forms of economy.

Cemeteries were small in size (up to 36 graves) and are found mainly in the forest-steppe regions of Bashkortostan. Most were composed of earthen mounds over elongated holes in the ground, with corpses on their backs with the head to the west-northwest. Cremation was rare. Equipment was often included in the graves, usually vessels, less often tools and weapons, and the remains of the funerary feasts.

The Mezhovsky culture exemplified the final phase of the Bronze Age of Ural forest zone and had a significant influence on the formation of the transition of the Ural cultures from the Bronze Age to the early Iron Age.

== Archaeogenetics and origins ==
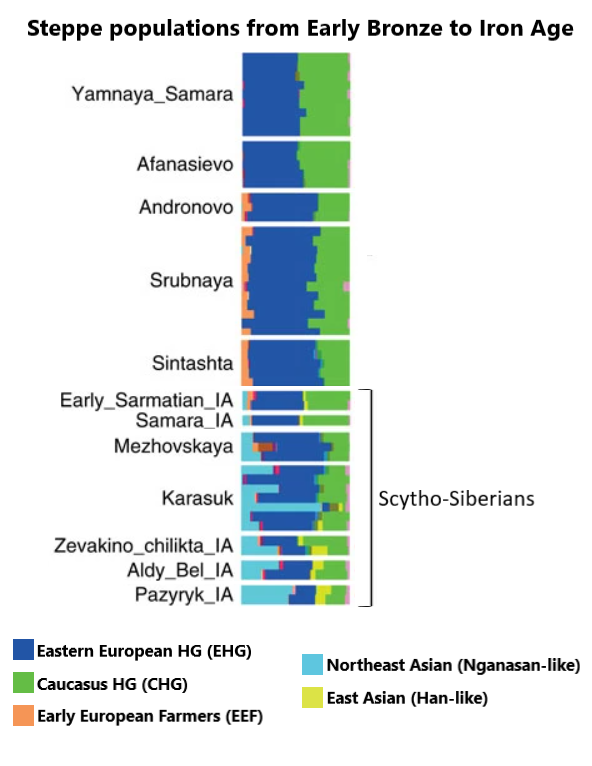
Genetic makeup of Bronze and Iron Age Steppe populations

The Mezhovskaya culture formed from the admixture of local Srubnaya-like ancestry (c. 74%) with additional Nganasan-like (c. 18%) and Ancient North Eurasian (c. 8%) admixture. The later proto-Ugric genepool is inferred to have formed by further Eastern influx, resulting in a gene pool of c. 48% Srubnaya-like, c. 44% Nganasan-like and c. 8% ANE-like ancestry. It is thus considered that the Mezhovskaya culture was composed of a mixed population of Indo-European (Andronovo culture) and Ugrian (Cherkaskul culture) tribes. In 2015, a genetic study of ancient dwellings of the Mezhovskaya culture was made of people found at the Kapova Cave (Shulgan-tash). Three individuals (RISE523, RISE524, RISE525) of the Mezhovskaya in Southern Ural from 1400 BC to 1000 BC were studied. The analysis of their paternal haplogroups determined one individual to belong to the haplogroup R1a-Z93, while the other one was determined to belong to R-M269, which historians had thought were the result of migrations of early Indo-Europeans from the Black Sea to Siberia and Middle Asia via the Urals. The samples of mtDNA extracted belonged to haplogroups M12'G, J2b1a and I5c.

The autosomal genetics does not seem to have died out, but contributed in part to the later Ugric-speaking groups.
