= Cherkaskul culture =

Archaeological culture of the Bronze Age

- Geographical range: Southern Urals, Western Siberia
- Period: Late Bronze Age
- Dates: c. 1600 BC – c. 1250 BC
- Preceded by: Ayat culture Andronovo culture
- Followed by: Ananyino culture Mezhovskaya culture Barkhatovskaya culture

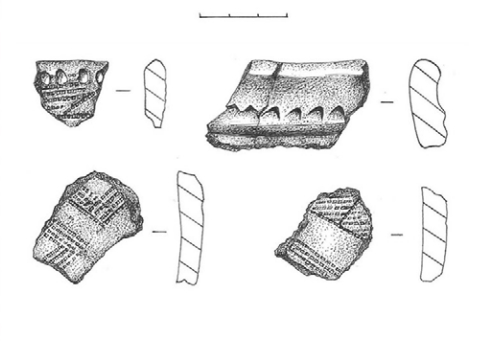
Semiyarka pottery sherds. Cherkaskul culture

The Cherkaskul culture is an archaeological culture of the Bronze Age, which existed in the south of the Ural and Western Siberia. It is named after the village Cherkaskul in the Kaslinsky District of the Chelyabinsk Oblast. Opened K.V.Salnikov in 1964.

== Origin ==
The population of the Cherkaskul culture may be ancestral to the Ugrian peoples.

The ancestors of the Cherkaskul culture are associated with the population of the Ayat culture, which was located in the north of the modern Sverdlovsk Oblast. The Cherkaskul culture's population interacted with the tribes of the Andronovo culture.
