= Ekven =

Archaeological site in the Russian Chukotka Autonomous Okrug

Ekven is an archaeological site in the Russian Chukotka Autonomous Okrug. It is located 30 km from the village of Uelen. Here a 2000-year-old Eskimo Cemetery from the Old Bering Sea culture was discovered by D.A. Sergeev and S.A. Arutiunov. They found graves made of wood, stone and whale bones. There were also burial of an older woman with a wooden mask.

Ekven is one of the most important archaeological discoveries in this area, competing only with Ipiutak site, Alaska, United States. The archaeological finds here produced a clearer picture of the Old Bering Sea culture. For example, much evidence of female shaman were found. Altogether Ekven has about 100 graves which are still studied by Russian archaeologist Mikhael Bronstein.

== See also ==
- Ipiutak site
