= Itkul culture =

Coordinates: 56.090000°N 60.300000°E

- Location of the Itkul culture and contemporary cultures circa 500 BCE.
- Geographical range: Eastern Ural
- Period: Iron Age
- Dates: 6th-4th century BCE
- Preceded by: Andronovo culture
- Followed by: Sarmatian culture

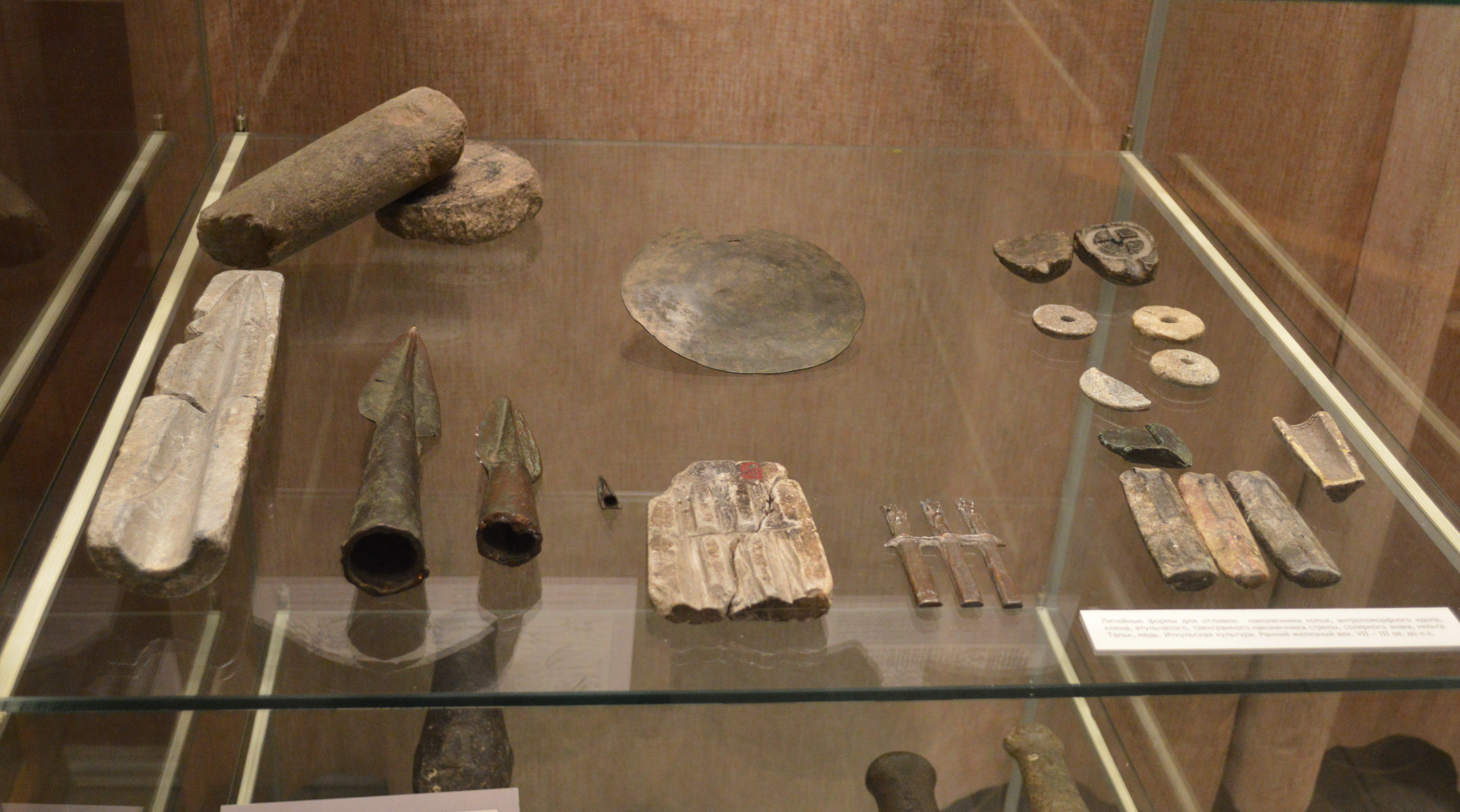
Itkul culture casting moulds

Itkul culture (Russian: Иткульская культура, romanized: Itkulʹskaja kulʹtura, 7th-5th century BCE) was one of the Early Saka cultures, based in the Ural's eastern foothills. Itkul culture was part of an East to West movement of Asiatic Saka tribes towards the Ural regions during the Iron Age (c.1000 BCE and later). Other Saka groups, such as the Tasmola culture (circa 600 BCE), were also involved in similar movements and settled in the southern Urals.

The Itkul culture had a heavy focus on metalworking. The Itkul people made great use of the metallurgical resources of the Urals and established fortified settlements to protect themselves. It is likely they provided weapons to other tribes of the steppes.

The Itkul culture eventually assimilated into the Early Sarmatian culture during the early Prokhorovka period and contributed to its varied genetic makeup. As a result, a large-scale integrated union of nomads from Central Asia and the Near East formed there in the 5th–4th century BCE, with fairly uniform cultural practices. This cultural complex, with notable ‘‘foreign elements’’, corresponds to the ‘‘royal’’ burials of the Filippovka kurgans, and define the "Prokhorovka period" of the Early Sarmatians.

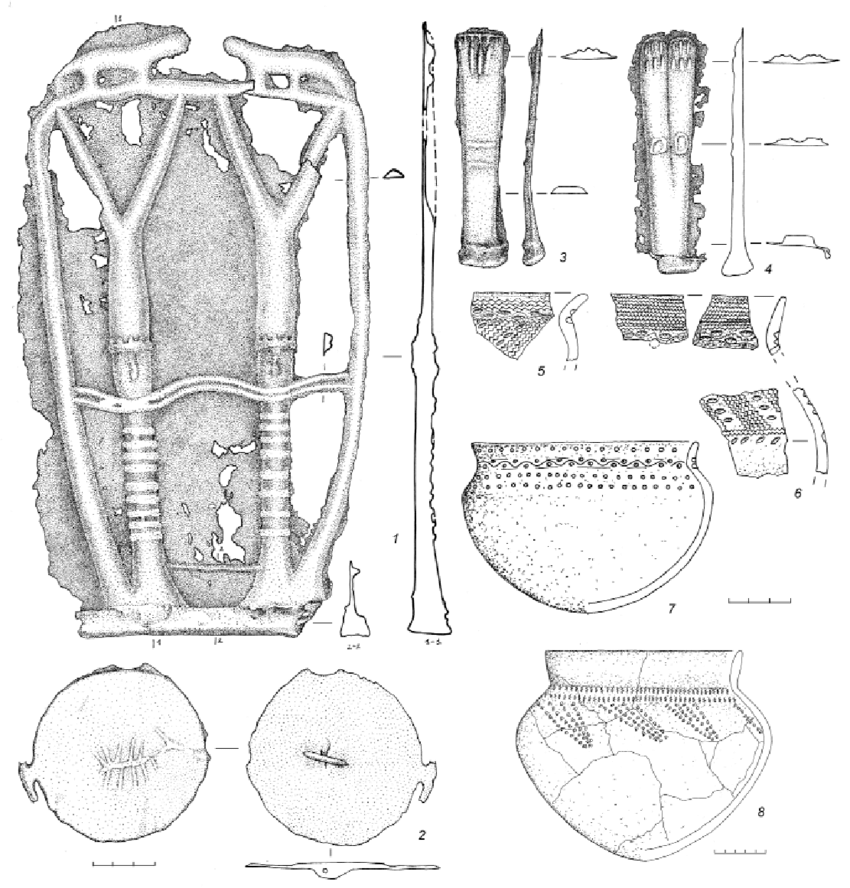
Artifacts: 1 to 4-Kuganak hoard 5 to 6-Akberdino 3 settlement 7-Elder Shipovo burial ground 8-Kasianov hillfort (1-4 bronze; 5-8 ceramics)

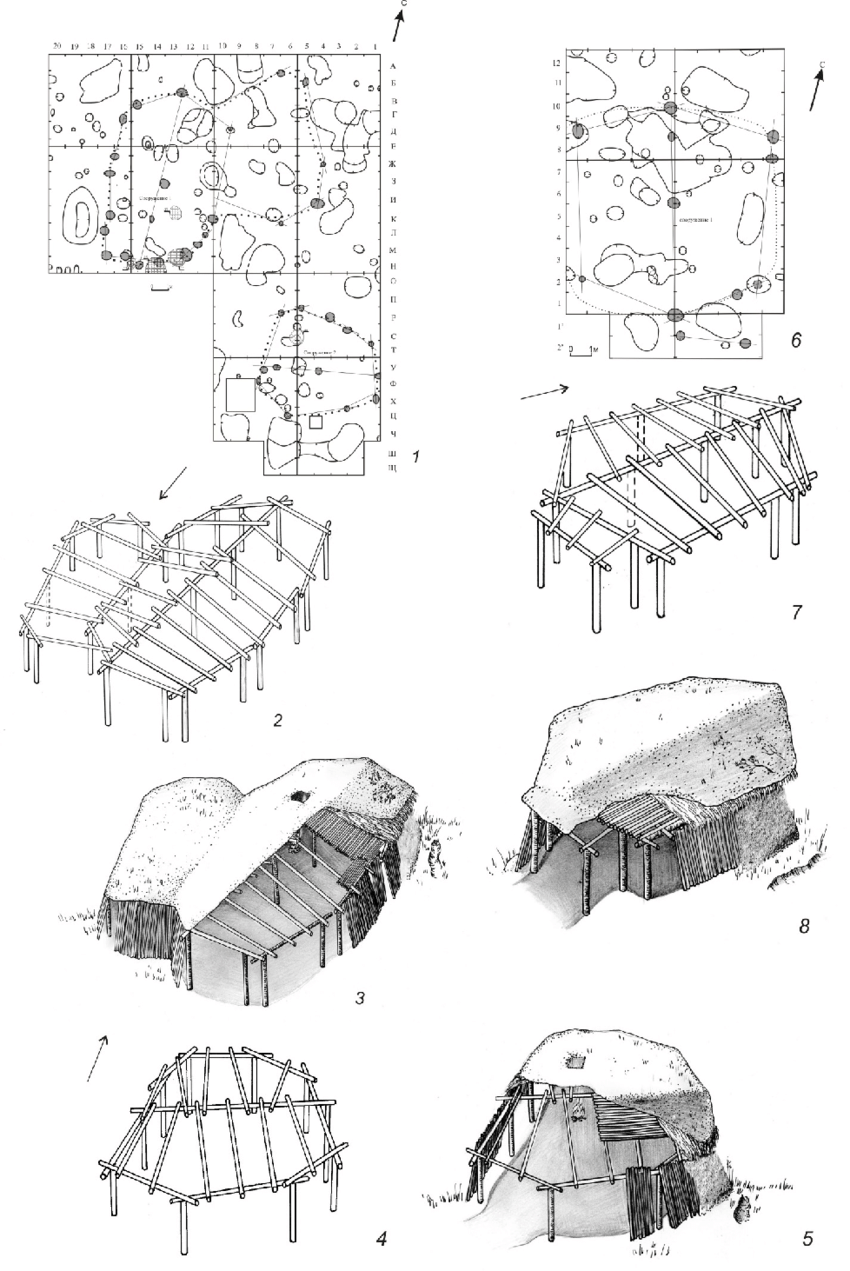
Housing reconstruction

== Genetics ==
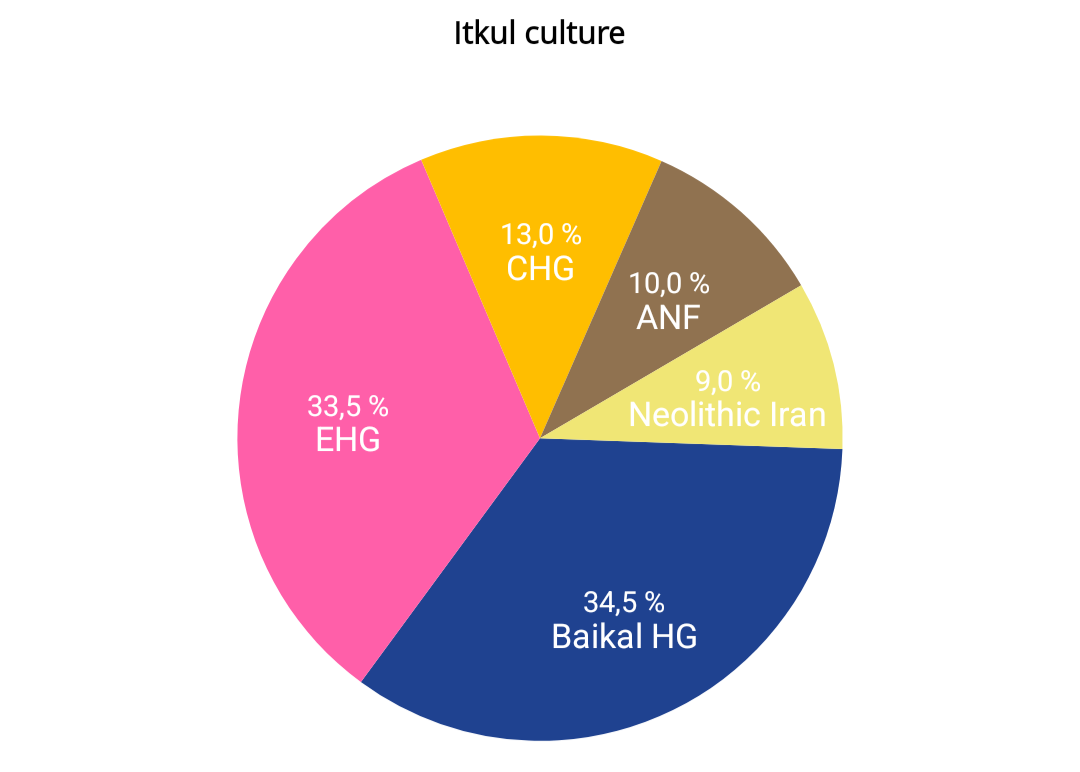
Autosomal DNA Itkul culture.

The Itkul had haplogroup R1a. Unlike the preceding Mezhovskaya culture, which genetically descended from steppe cattle breeders associated with Andronovo culture (with a small East Eurasian contribution), the Itkul had a significant East Eurasian component.
