= Araltobe kurgan =

Burial mound in Kazakhstan

Araltobe barrow
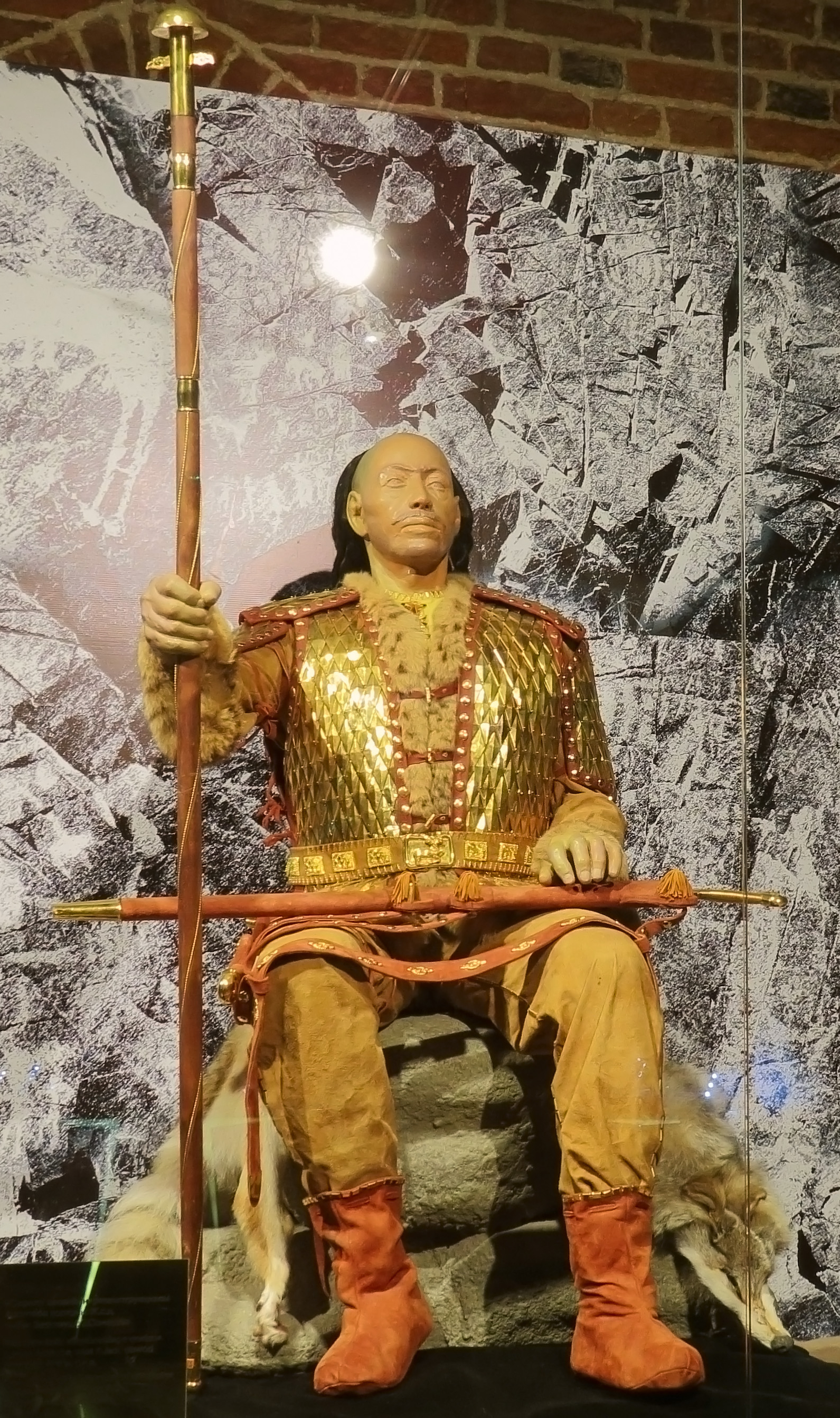
- Reconstruction of Sarmatian chieftain. Araltobe barrow, Kazakhstan, III-II c. BCE. Excavation of Z. Samashev.

- Location within Continental Asia Location within Kazakhstan
- 47°7′19″N 54°43′4″E
- Type: Kurgan

The Araltobe kurgan (Ru: Аралтобе курган) is a burial ground found near Araltobe, Zhylyoi District, in northwestern Kazakhstan, thought to belong to a member of the post-Saka Sarmatian culture, and dated to the 3rd-2nd century BCE.

The mound (Zhylyoi "Araltobe" necropolis 1-mound) was excavated in 1999 in the Atyraw region by archaeologists Zeinulla Samashev and Zhumash Dzhetybaeva. They found the remains of a "Golden Man", who presents some parallels with similar "Golden men" found in Issyk kurgan or the kurgan at Shilikty.

Long swords with T-shaped pommel and long swords with mushroom-shaped pommel were discovered during the excavation. These are types of "Scythian swords" usually found in the Scythian/Saka kurgans in Central Asia and Eastern Europe, but also known from Sauromations burials as in tumulus no. 3 of the Onaibulak graveyard, tumulus no. 1 and 2 of the Mortik graveyard, or tumulus no. 1 of the Araltobe graveyard.

About 400 gold objects were discovered in the tomb.

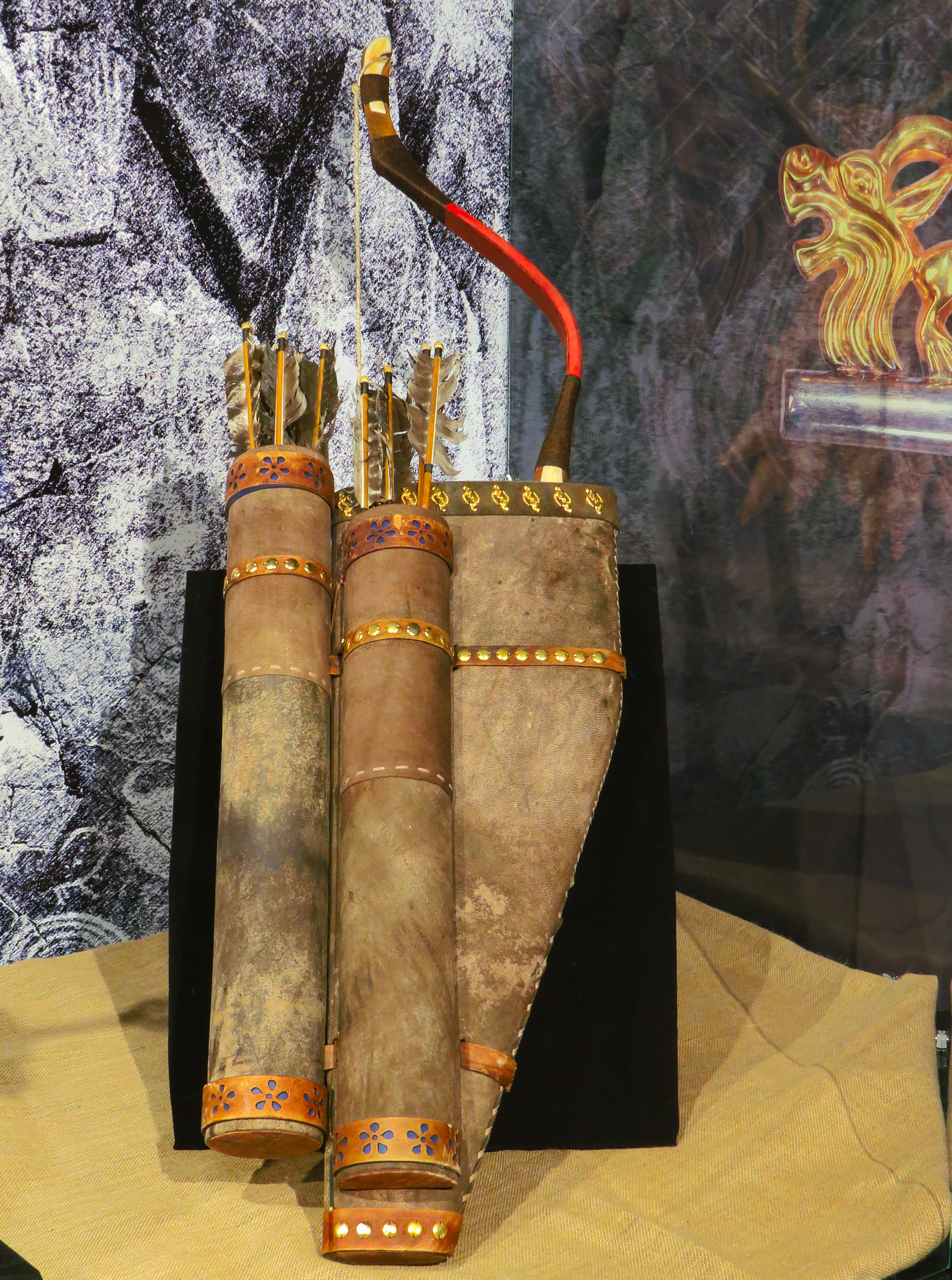
Bow and arrows from Araltobe barrow

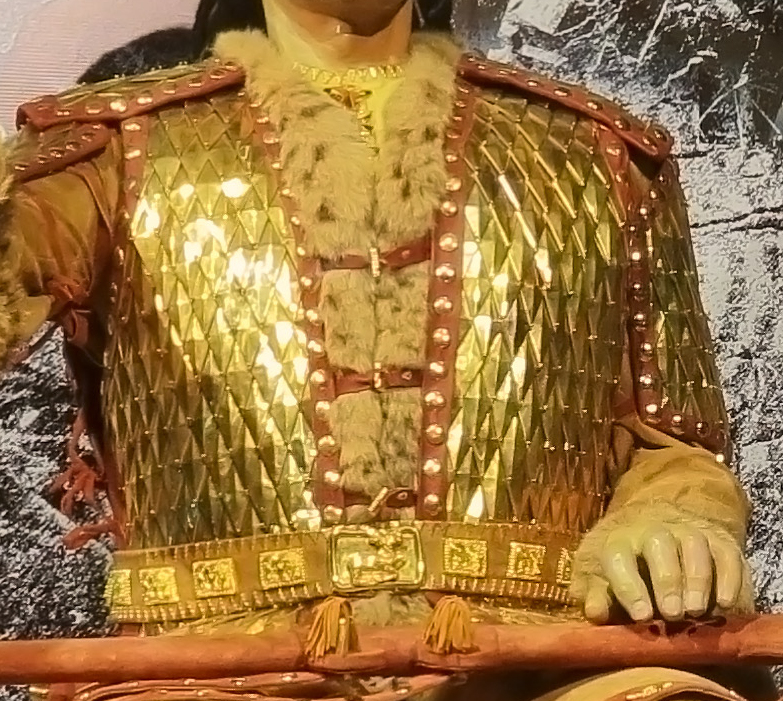
Araltobe golden vest (detail)

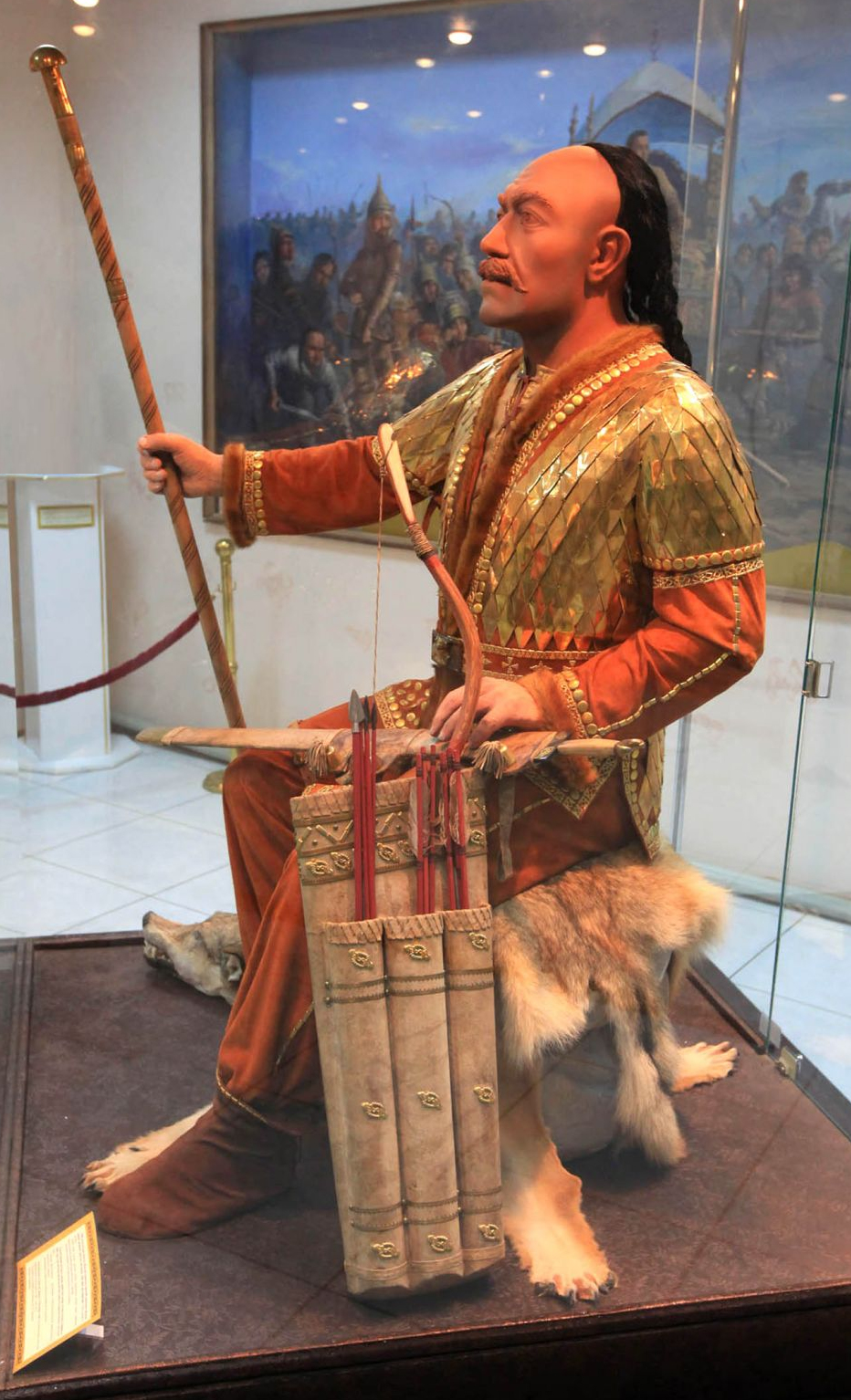
Araltobe kurgan chief

== See also ==
- Taksai kurgan
- Filippovka kurgans
