= Scopasis =

6th century BC Sarmatian king and military commander

Scopasis (Ancient Greek: Σκώπασις Skṓpasis) was a 6th-century BC Scythian king of the Sauromatae tribe. The Greek historian Herodotus mentions him in his Histories, as he and the kings Taxakis and Idanthyrsus commanded the three divisions of the Scythian forces, when Scythia was invaded by Darius I of Persia in between 520 and 507 BC (most likely in 513 BC). It was the contingent under the command of Scopasis that arrived at the Istros (Danube) river before Darius could reach it during his retreat. Scopasis defeated Darius' Ionian allies to destroy the bridge of boats over the river and thus ensure the destruction and defeat of the Persian forces.
