= Taksai kurgans =

Coordinates: 51.196575°N 52.176884°E

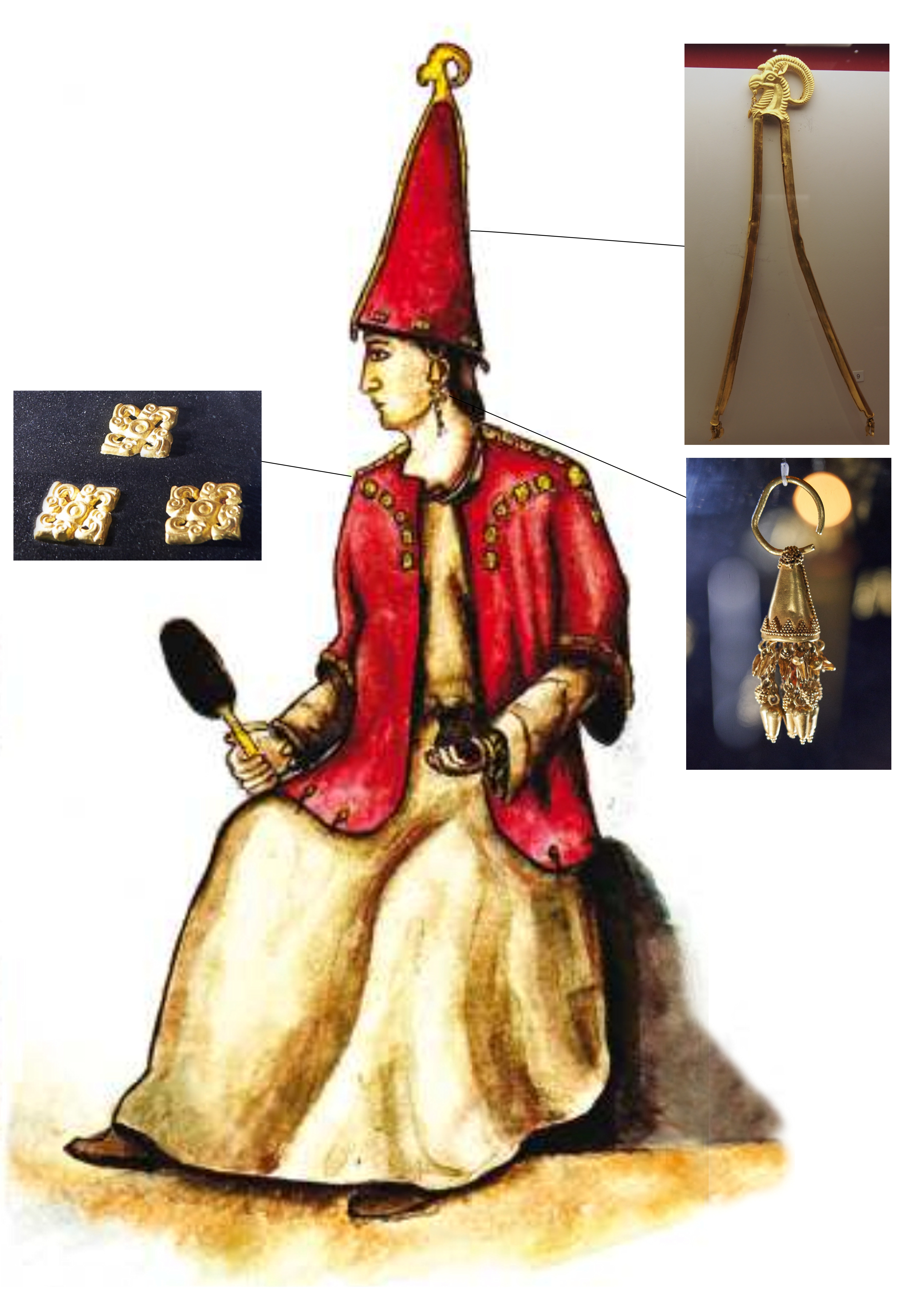
- Taksai-1 Golden Lady and artifacts.

Location
- Location of the Taksai kurgans and contemporary cultures circa 500 BCE

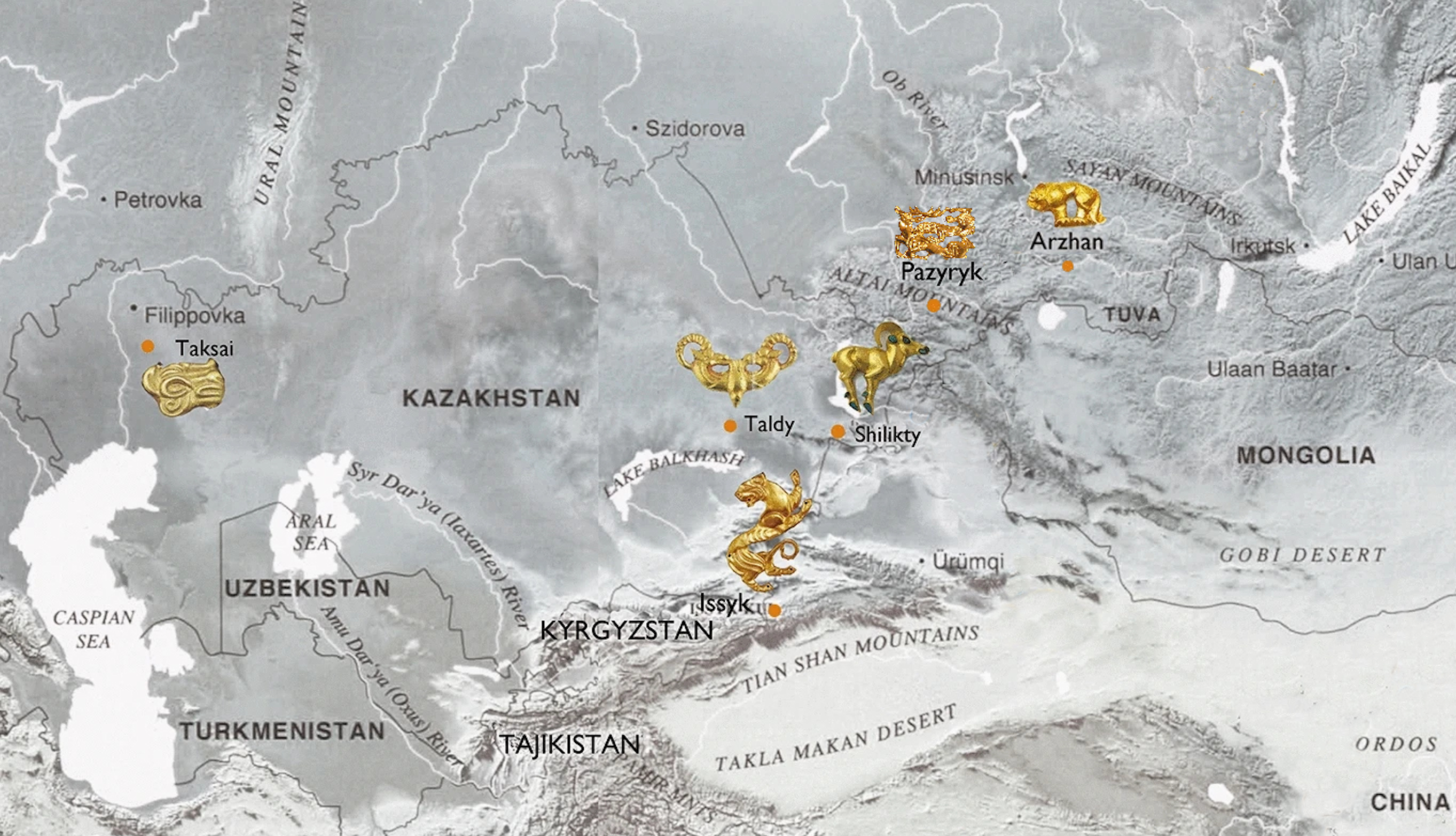
Taksai among other kurgan treasures in Central Asia.

The Taksai kurgans (more precisely Taksai-1, Ru: Таксайский курган) are a series of Saka or Sauromatian funeral mounds or kurgans, located in the Terekti District of the southern Urals, in northwestern Kazakhstan. They are dated to circa 500 BCE. The Kurgan was undisturbed and had provided numerous valuable artifacts. The Taksai-1 kurgan was the tomb of a rich Saka lady, dubbed the "golden lady". Some of her objects reflect the iconography of the Achaemenid Empire, which must have been in contact with these nomadic tribes.

The nomadic people of the southern Ural are traditionally identified as Sauromatians, but the people of the Taksai kurgan seem to be issued from the immigration of a new wave of nomads to the region around the 6th century BCE, who were characterized by this type of kurgans, and may represent the immigration of Asian nomads to the Urals, possibly prompted by the conflicts with the Achaemenid Empire.

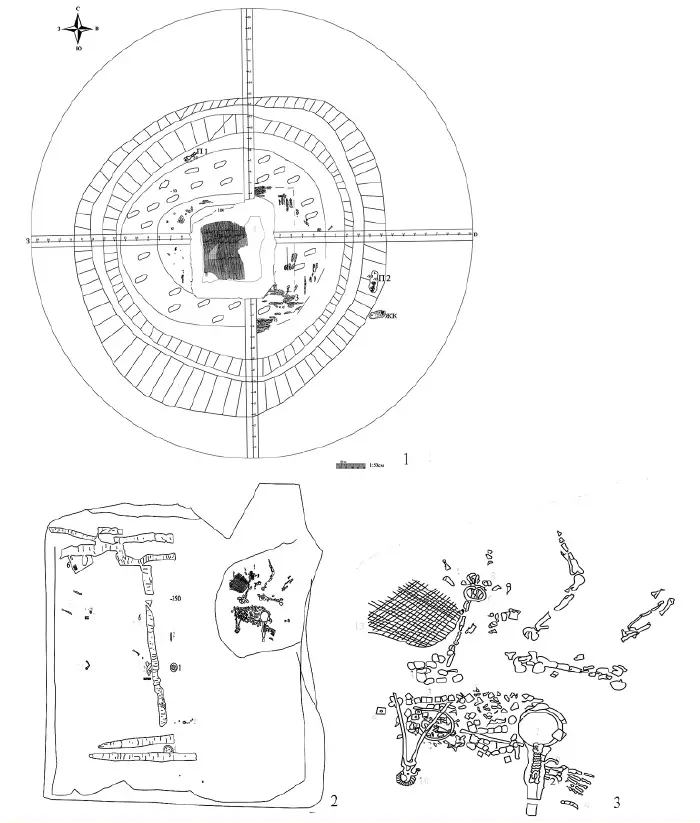
Taksai plan of barrow no. 6, burial ground Taksay-1; 2 – central pit covered by logs;3 – grave no. 3.

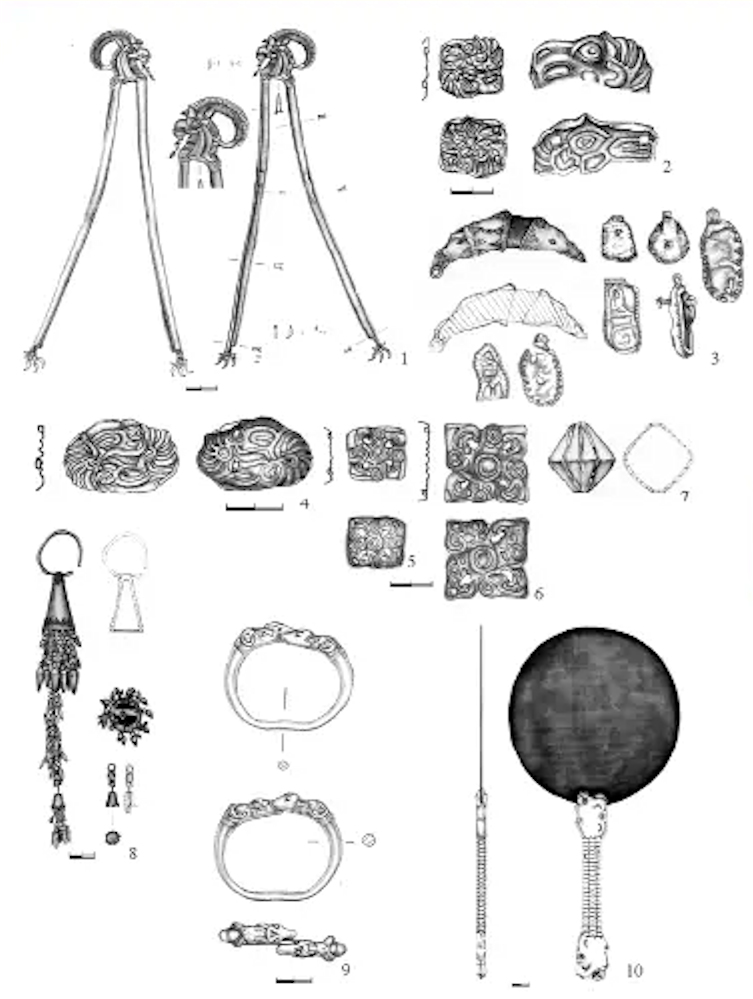
Taksai-1, barrow 6 artifacts

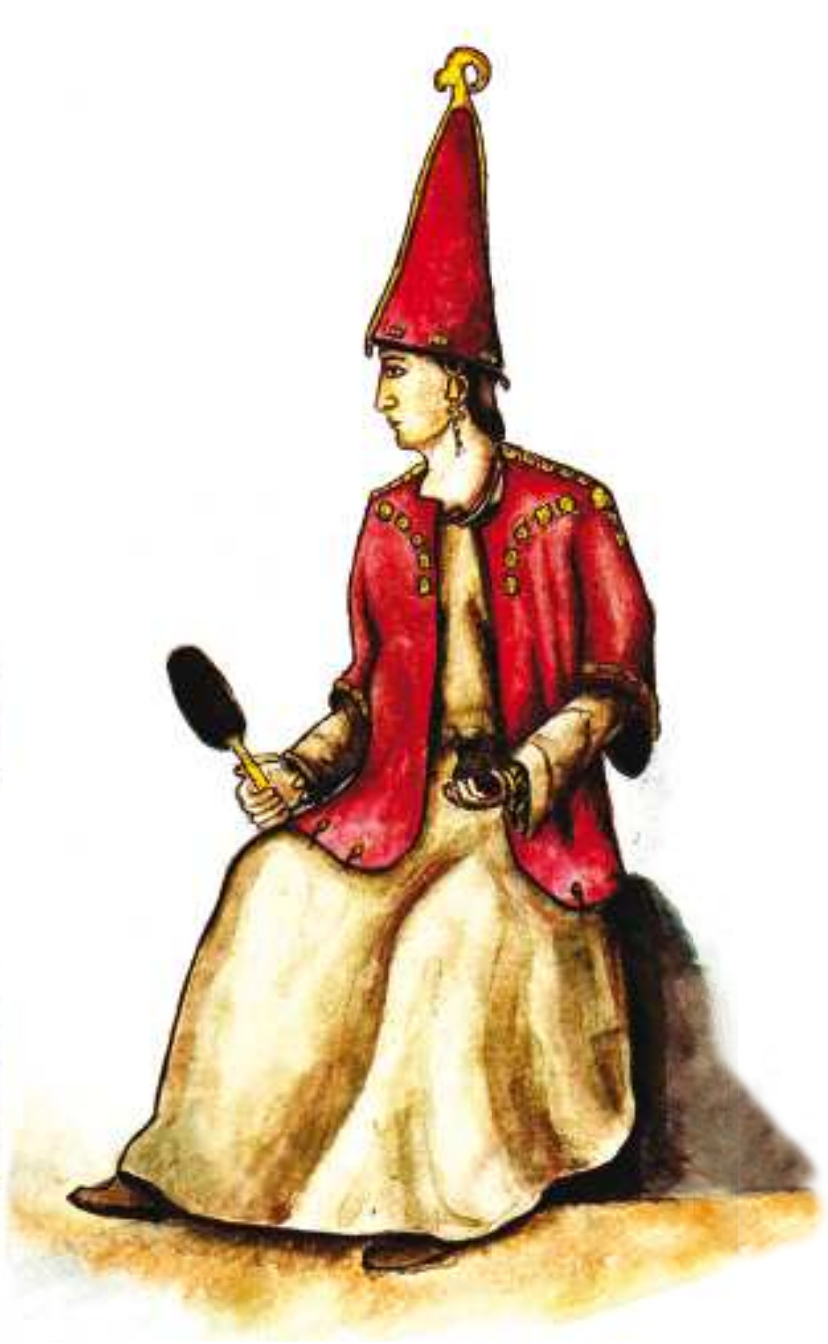
Taksai-1 Barrow 6 lady (reconstruction)

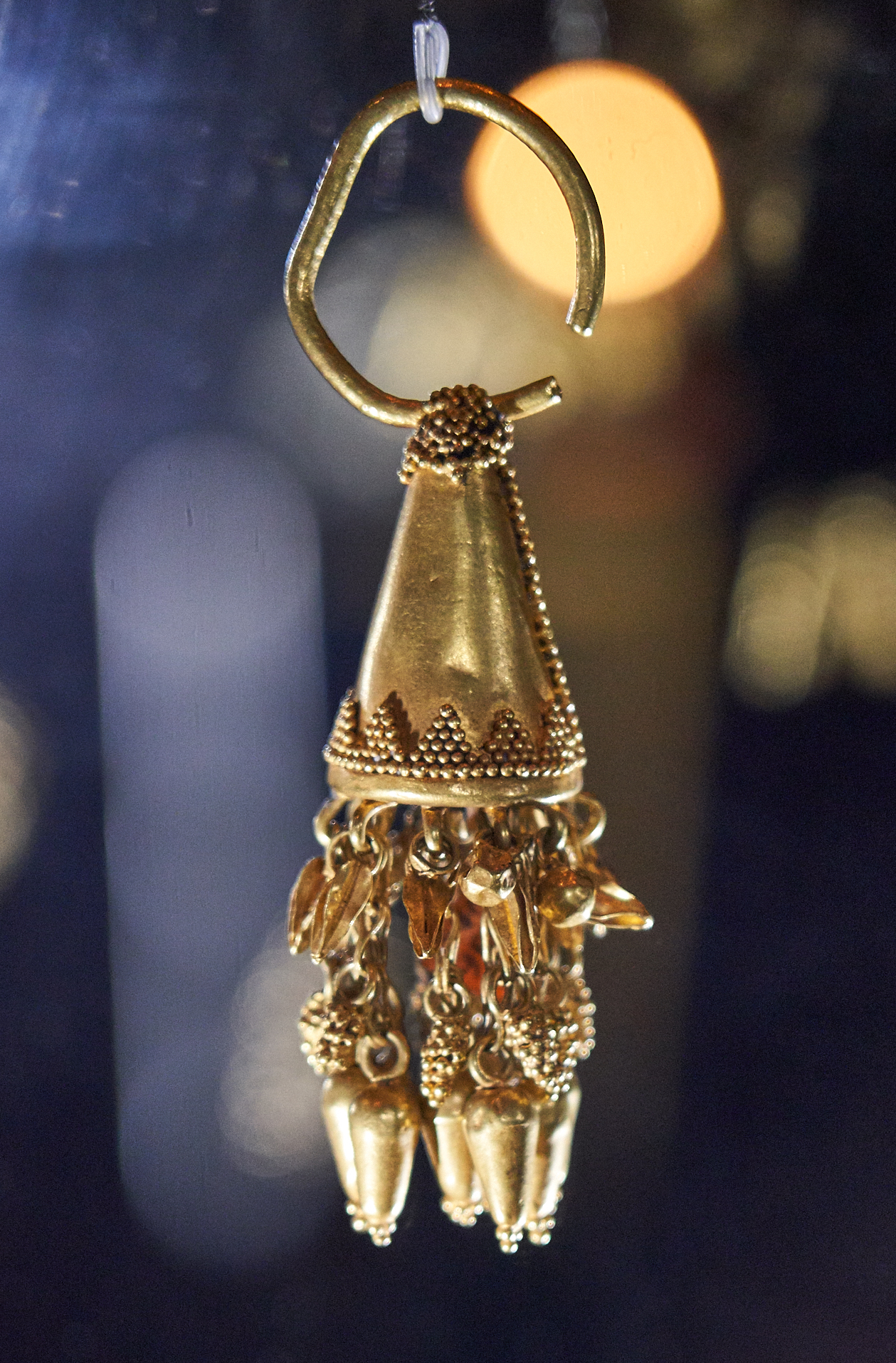
Pendant, Taksai I kurgan 6, 6-5th century BCE.

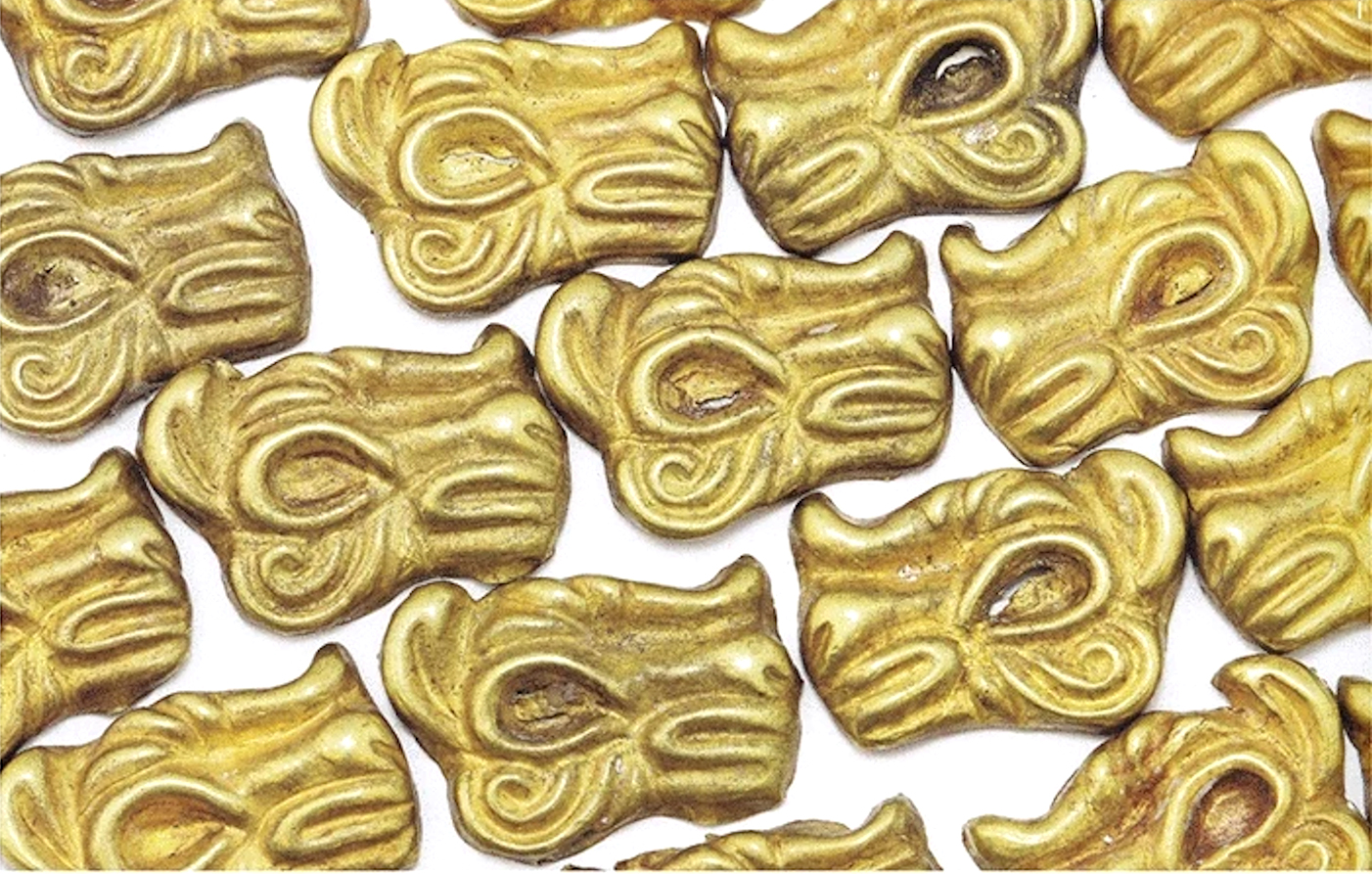
Gold appliqués in the form of a ram's head, Barrow 6 of Taksai I, Kazakhstan

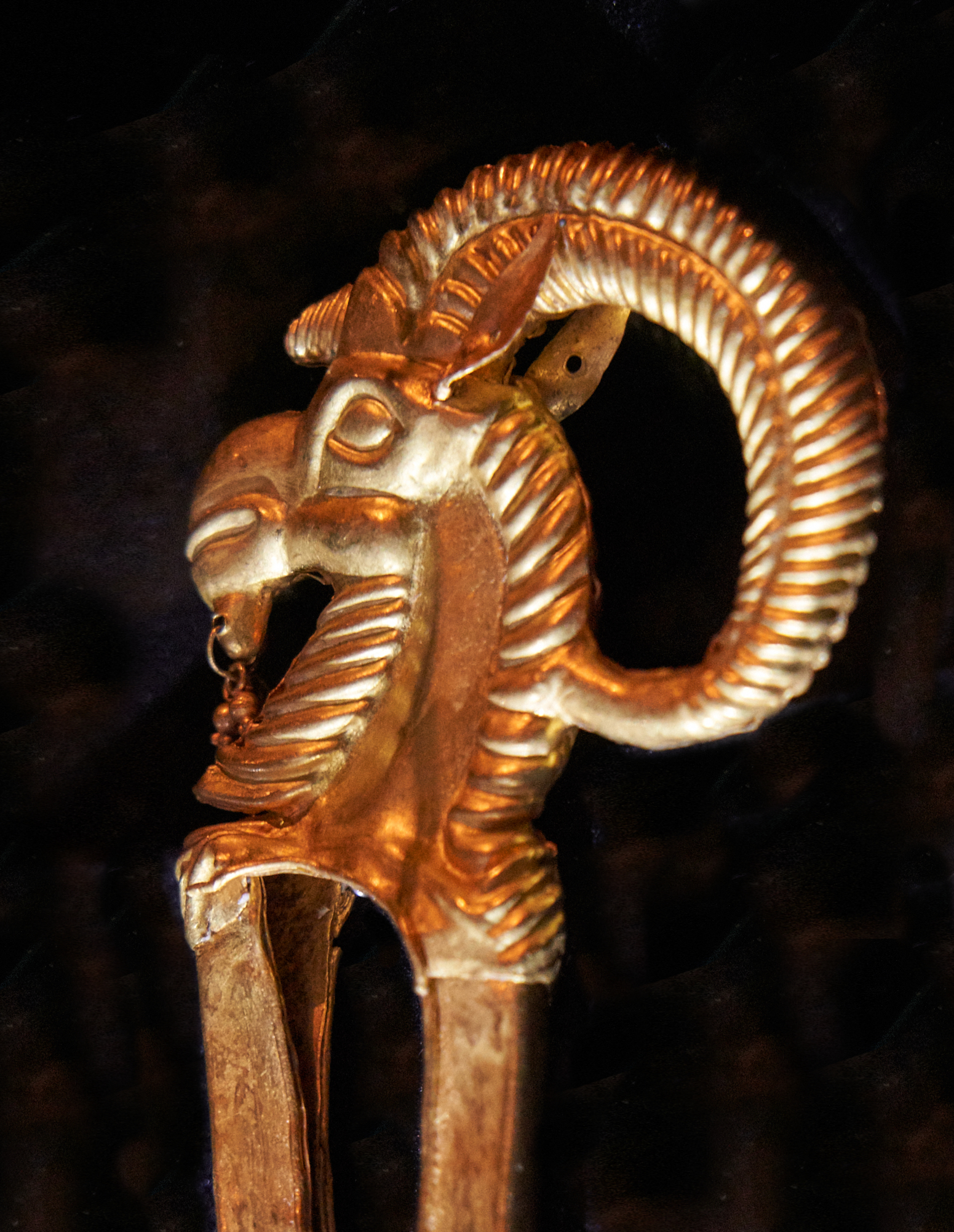
Decoration of the tip of the hat. Taksai I, kurgan 6, 5th–4th century BCE. H. 46.0 cm. National Museum of the Republic of Kazakhstan

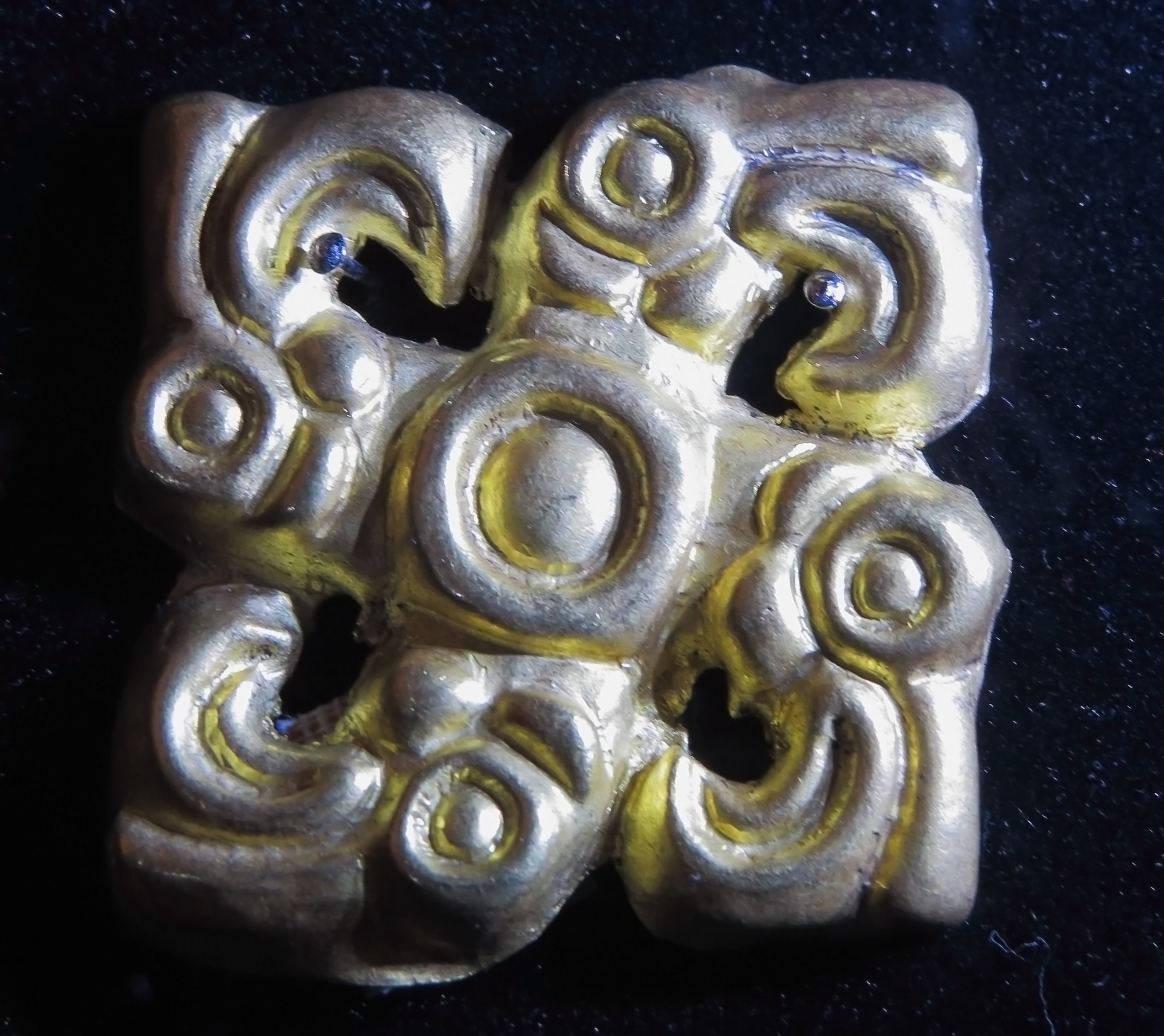
Small sewed-on plaque in the form of a swastika, formed from four heads of griffins. Taksai I, mound 6

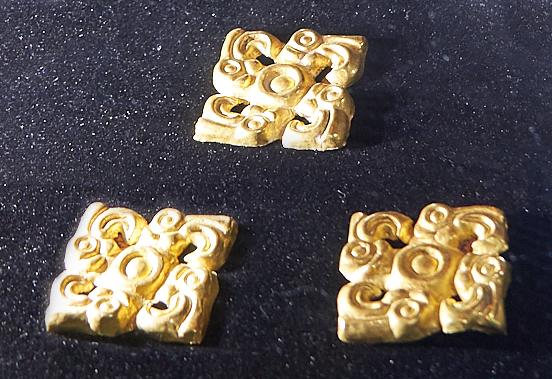
Taksai artifacts

== See also ==
- Filippovka kurgans, about 100 km to the east
- Araltobe kurgan

== Sources ==
- Summerer, Lâtife (1 January 2020). "The wooden comb of the 'golden lady': a new battle image from the Taksai-1 kurgan (western Kazakhstan)". Masters of the Steppe: The Impact of the Scythians and Later Nomad Societies of Eurasia.
- Altynbekov, Krym (2013). ВОЗРОЖДЕННАЯ ИЗ ПЕПЛА. Реконструкция по материалам погребения жрицы из комплекса Таксай I. Алматы-Уральск, 2013 / REVIVED FROM THE ASHES. Reconstruction on material of priestess burial from Taksay I complex. Almaty-Uralsk.
