= Equal-to-apostles =

Special title given to some saints in Eastern Orthodoxy and in Byzantine Catholicism

Equal-to-apostles or equal-to-the-apostles (Note: Ancient Greek: ἰσαπόστολος, romanized: isapóstolos; Latin: aequalis apostolis; Arabic: معادل الرسل, muʿādil ar-rusul; Georgian: მოციქულთასწორი, romanized: motsikultasts'ori; Romanian: întocmai cu Apostolii; Russian: равноапостольный, ravnoapostol'nyj; Bulgarian and Serbian: равноапостолни, ravnoapostolni; Albanian: i barabartë me Apostojët; Ukrainian: рівноапостольний) (Ισαπόστολος in Greek) is a special title given to some saints in Eastern Orthodoxy and in Byzantine Catholicism. The title, Ισαπόστολος, is bestowed as a recognition of these saints' outstanding service in the spreading and assertion of Christianity, comparable to that of the original apostles.

== Examples ==
Below is a partial list of saints who are called equal-to-the-apostles:

- Mary Magdalene (1st century)
- Photine, the Samaritan woman at the well (1st century)
- Thecla (1st century)
- Apphia (1st century)
- Abercius of Hieropolis (2nd century)
- Gregory Thaumaturgus (c. 213 - 270), student of Origen, and ranked as equal to the Apostles by Basil in “On Holy Spirit”, Chapter 29
- Anak the Parthian (3rd century), father of first Catholicos of Armenians–Gregory the Illuminator
- Helena of Constantinople (c. 250 – c. 330)
- Constantine the Great (c. 272 – 337)
- Nino (c. 296 – c. 338 or 340), baptizer of the Georgians
- Mirian III of Iberia (died 361), first Christian Georgian monarch
- Nana of Iberia (4th century)
- Patrick of Ireland (5th century)
- Cyril (827–869)
- Rastislav of Moravia (870)
- Methodius (815–885)
- Angelar (died after 885)
- Photios I of Constantinople (c. 820 – c. 891)
- Gorazd of Ohrid (9th century)
- Naum of Ohrid (died 910)
- Clement of Ohrid (died 916)
- Olga of Kiev (c. 890–969)
- Vladimir the Great (c. 958–1015)
- Olaf II of Norway (c. 995–1030), baptiser of Norway
- Stephen I of Hungary (969–1038)
- Sava of Serbia (1169/1174–1236)
- Cosmas of Aetolia (1714–1779)
- Innocent of Alaska (1797–1879)
- Nicholas of Japan (1836–1912)

== Political use of the term ==
As George Ostrogorsky relates, the insistence of pre-Christian Roman emperors on being worshipped as gods had always been a fundamental stumbling block for early Christians (see Anti-Christian policies in the Roman Empire). Nevertheless, even with the advent of Christian emperors, of which Constantine the Great was the first, the sovereign's power maintained a distinctly divine flavour. Indeed, to use Ostrogorsky's more strongly worded phrasing, "the Roman-Hellenistic cult of the sovereign lived on in the Christian Byzantine empire in all its ancient glory." The Greek term for "Equal-to-the-Apostles", isapóstolos, was used in the late Roman/Byzantine empire to contribute to this divine imperial image. Constantine himself seems to have had this in mind when, according to Eusebius of Caesarea, he designed the Church of the Holy Apostles to be his tomb in Constantinople:

[This edifice] the emperor consecrated with the desire of perpetuating the memory of the apostles of our Saviour. He had, however, another object in erecting this building: an object at first unknown, but which afterwards became evident to all. He had in fact made choice of this spot in the prospect of his own death, anticipating with extraordinary fervor of faith that his body would share their title with the apostles themselves [τῆς τῶν ἀποστόλων προσρήσεως κοινωνὸν], and that he should thus even after death become the subject, with them, of the devotions which should be performed to their honor in this place. He accordingly caused twelve coffins to be set up in this church, like sacred pillars in honor and memory of the apostolic number, in the center of which his own was placed, having six of theirs on either side of it.

— Eusebius of Caesarea, Life of Constantine

Symbolism aside, modern scholars offer differing accounts as to whether Eusebius ever used the actual title of isapóstolos in reference to Constantine. John Julius Norwich maintains that "for the last few years of his life, Constantine had regularly used the title isapóstolos", though he does not cite a primary source. The New Catholic Encyclopedia (supplement 2010) states that Eusebius did refer to Constantine with this title, although it too does not cite a primary source. Aidan Nichols also shares this view, positing that Eusebius did indeed describe Constantine as isapóstolos, but that a later editor, or "interpolator," had reduced his status to isepiskopos—Equal-to-a-Bishop—so as to make Constantine seem more modest. In contrast to this, Jonathan Bardill states rather bluntly that our sources do not directly speak of Constantine as an equal of the apostles until the 5th century (that is, after Eusebius).

This characterization was not without its problems, however. As alluded to above, though Constantine himself may very much have intended to be recognized as isapóstolos, many theologians and churchmen were made uneasy at this prospect. As Gilbert Dagron explains, the difficulty was not necessarily that Constantine was unworthy (merely immodest, more like), but rather that the title resulted in a very ambiguous mixing of church and state. Thus when Sozomen deals with Constantine's funeral in his ecclesiastical history, he makes a point of saying that bishops were afterwards interred in the same place, "for the hierarchical dignity is not only equal in honor to imperial power, but, in sacred places, even takes the ascendancy."

In time, however, the soon-to-be-sainted Constantine would nevertheless become firmly established as isapóstolos, being enshrined as such in the Bibliotheca Hagiographica Graeca and other Byzantine literature (ex. Anna Komnene confidently calls him the 13th apostle in the Alexiad, to whom she likens her father Alexius). Indeed, in this capacity he proved to be an irresistible model for many later Byzantine rulers, who would regularly make use of the title isapóstolos themselves—for political—as well as religious reasons.
