= Sava Sedmochislenik =

Eastern Orthodox saint

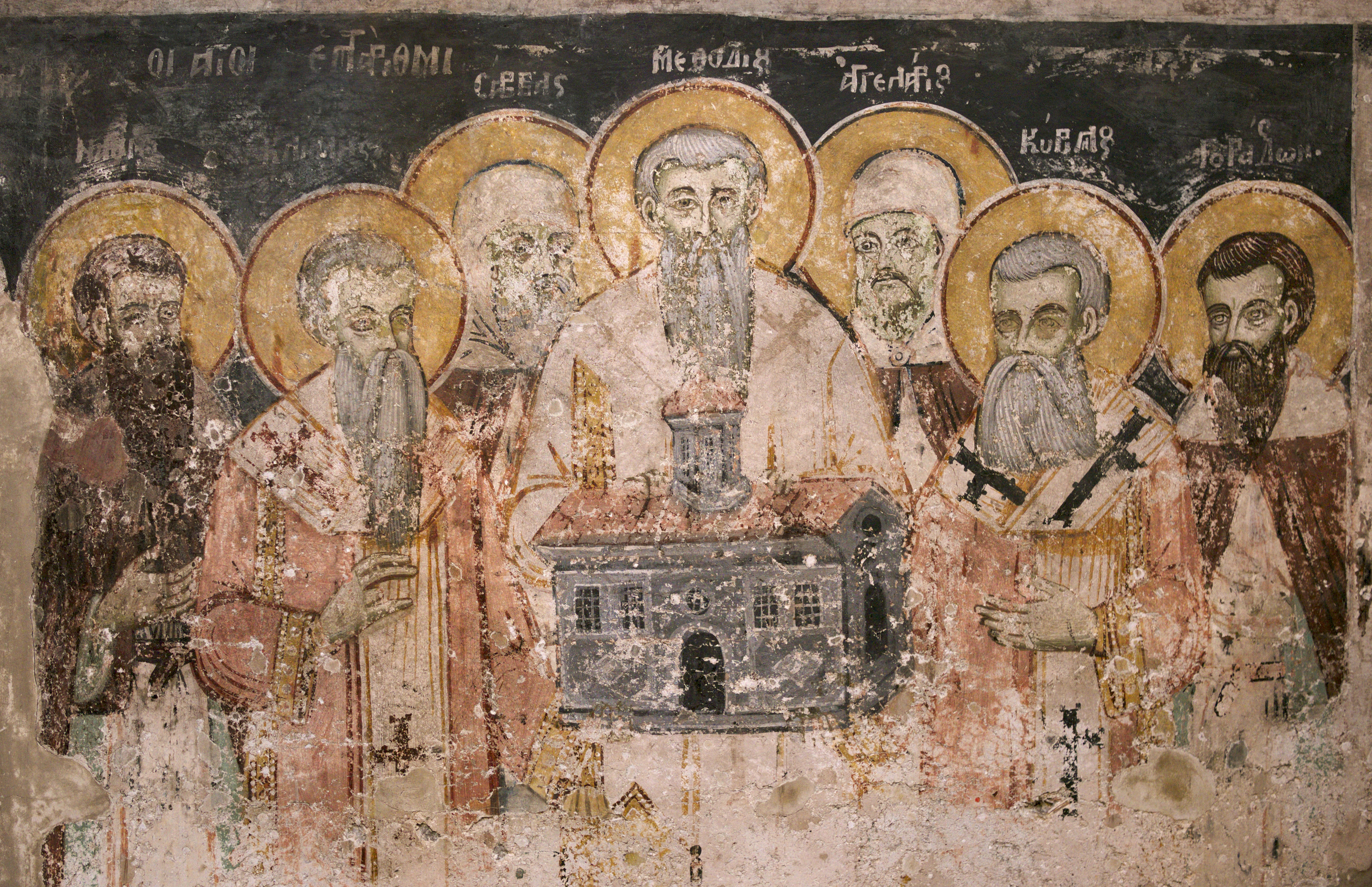
The "Seven Saints"

Saint Sava was a medieval Bulgarian and Slavic saint and one of the most prominent disciples of Saints Cyril and Methodius. Along with them and Saint Gorazd, Saint Clement of Ohrid, Saint Naum and Saint Angelar he is venerated as a member of a group known as the "Seven Saints".

In 868 in Rome he and Saint Angelar were ordained as deacons by the bishops Formosus and Gauderic, while Saint Gorazd, Saint Clement of Ohrid and Saint Naum were by the same bishops ordained as priests. In 885 Pope Stephen V issued a Papal bull to forbid the use of Slavic liturgy and in 886 the ruler of Great Moravia Svätopluk I exiled the disciples of the two brothers. The route of Sava and other disciples of Saints Cyril and Methodius to the First Bulgarian Empire remains unclear. They resettled in Bulgaria, where they were welcomed by Boris I and commissioned to establish theological schools.

The fate of Sava after his arrival in Bulgaria remains unclear. He died either in the late 9th century or in the early 10th century AD.
