= Angelar =

Saint Angelar
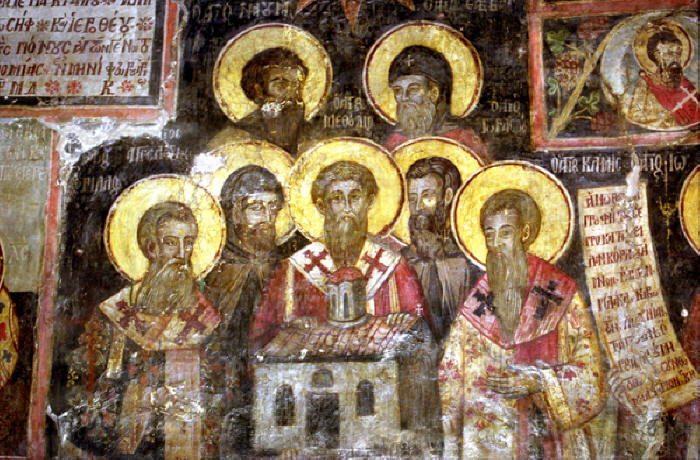
- Fresco of the Seven Saints in the Ardenica Monastery, Albania. St. Angelar is included amongst them.

Enlightener
- Died: 886 AD; First Bulgarian Empire
- Venerated in: Eastern Orthodoxy; Catholic Church
- Feast: July 27

Saint Angelar (Greek: Ἀγγελάριος, Angelarios; Bulgarian: Ангеларий, Angelariy; died 886 AD) was a medieval Bulgarian saint and Slavic enlightener.

He was one of the most prominent disciples of Saints Cyril and Methodius. Along with them and Saint Gorazd, Saint Clement of Ohrid, Naum of Preslav and Saint Sava he is venerated as a member of a group known as the "Seven Saints".

In 868 in Rome he and Saint Sava were ordained as deacons by the bishops Formosus and Gauderic, while Saint Gorazd, Saint Clement of Ohrid and Saint Naum were by the same bishops ordained as priests. After Methodius' death in 885 Pope Stephen V forbade the use of the Slavic liturgy and Wiching as Methodius' successor exiled the disciples of the two brothers from Great Moravia. Angelar fled together with Saint Clement, Saint Naum and others to the First Bulgarian Empire, where he died soon afterwards probably in 886.

The Bulgarian Orthodox Church, alongside the Catholic Church has set July 27 as the day of the Assumption of Clement of Ohrid and the day of the Seven Saints.

== Honours ==
St. Angelariy Peak in Antarctica is named "after the Bulgarian scholar St. Angelariy (9th century AD), a disciple of St. Cyril and St. Methodius."
