= Seven Apostles of Bulgaria =

Saints venerated in multiple Slavic cultures and churches

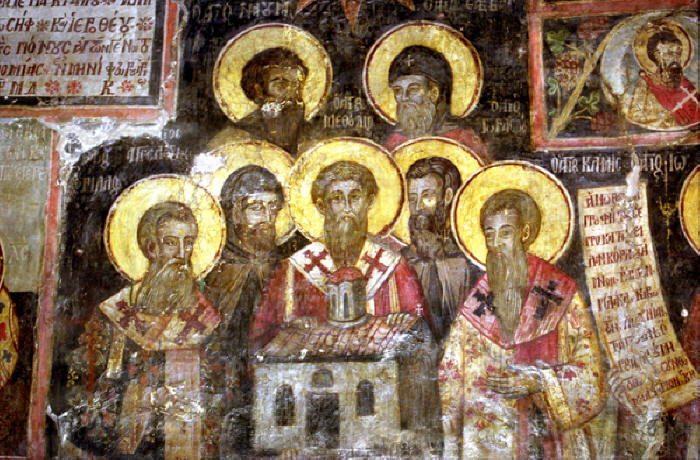

Equal-to-the-Apostles, Venerable
- Honored in: Eastern Orthodox Church; Catholic Church
- Feast: 27 July

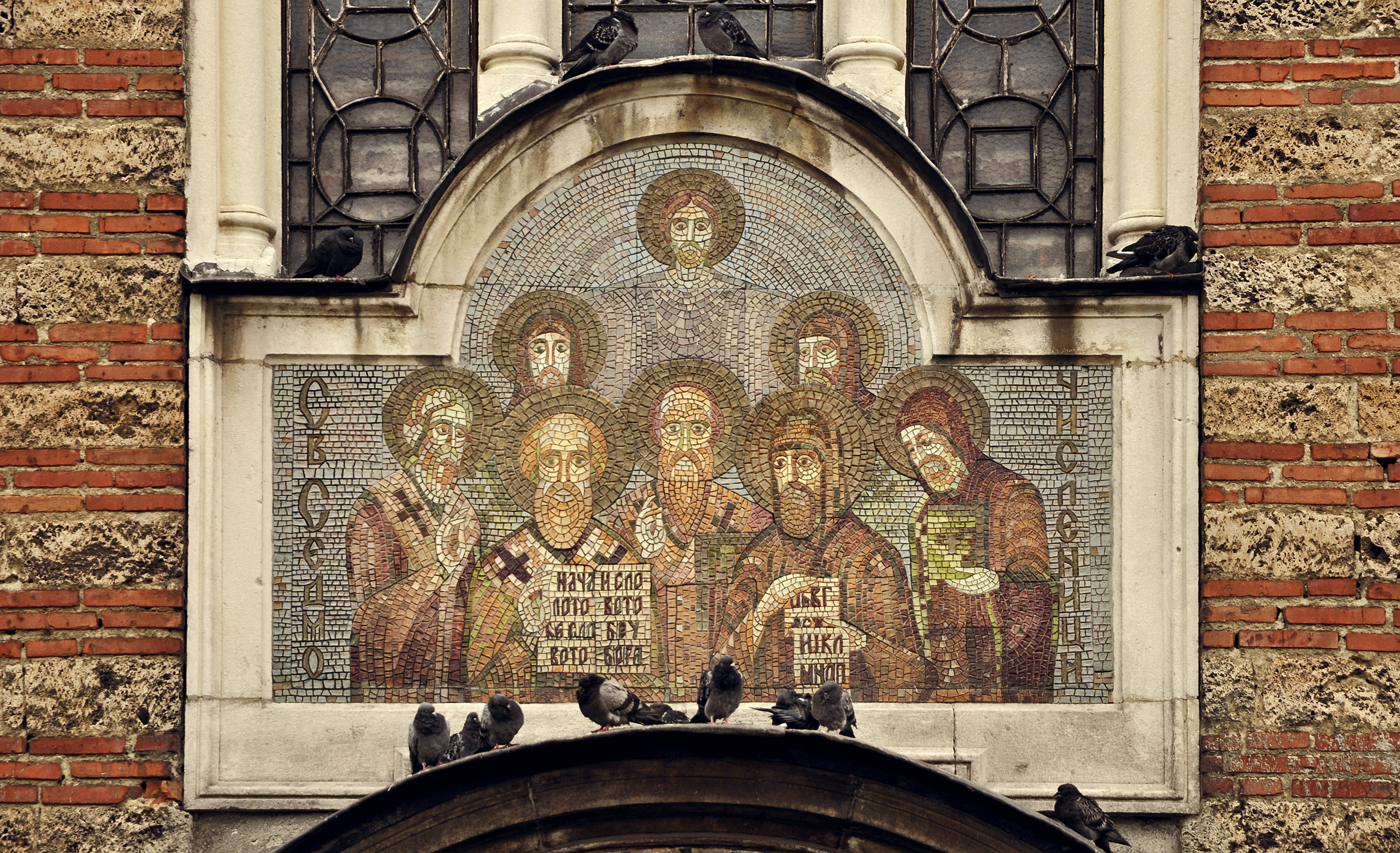
Mosaic of Seven Saints in Seven Saints Church, Sofia

The Seven Apostles (Bulgarian: Свети Седмочисленици, romanized: Sveti Sedmochislenitsi) are seven saints venerated in the Bulgarian Orthodox Church and the Catholic Church since the 10th century.

They are also revered as the creators and distributors of the Glagolitic and Cyrillic scripts. These saints are Saint Cyril and Methodius who created the Glagolitic script, and their five students Saint Gorazd, Clement of Ohrid, Naum, Angelar and Sava. Although Constantine of Preslav is considered a direct disciple of Methodius, the Church traditionally does not include him because he is not canonized.

In the Russian Orthodox Church, Cyril and Methodius are remembered separately, and their disciples are recognized with the title of Equal-to-the-apostles. The Bulgarian Orthodox Church has set July 27 as the day of the repose of Clement of Ohrid and the feast day of the Seven Apostles.

== See also ==
- Pliska Literary School
- Ohrid Literary School
