= Saint Gorazd =

9th-century Christian cleric

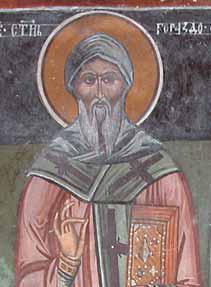
- Saint Gorazd on a painting from the Slivnica Monastery in North Macedonia (1606)

Equal to the Apostles
- Residence: Nitra, Great Moravia (until 885). Afterwards unknown, possibly Bulgaria or Poland
- Venerated in: Eastern Orthodox Church; Roman Catholic Church
- Canonized: Pre-Congregation
- Feast: 27 July (Western Christianity); 27 July together with the rest of the Seven Apostles of Bulgaria (Eastern Christianity )

Saint Gorazd was a 9th century cleric from the Great Moravia. In 867, he was ordained into priesthood, as one of the most prominent followers and students of saints Cyril and Methodius, the Apostles of the Slavs. In 885, as a designated successor of late archbishop Methodius, Gorazd tried to assume leadership in the Archbishopric of Moravia, but failed to secure support of the ruling prince Svatopluk I of Moravia.

Together with his teachers and fellow students Saint Clement of Ohrid, Saint Naum of Preslav, Saint Angelar and Saint Sava, Saint Gorazd belongs to the group of Christian Saints known as Seven Apostles of Bulgaria, venerated both in Eastern Christianity, particularly in the Balkans and individually both Eastern and Western Christian Churches in Slovakia. His feast day in the Western Church is 27 July and in the Eastern Church he shares the feast with the rest of the Seven Apostles, also on 27 July.

== Life ==
According to a quote attributed to Saint Methodius by the historian Francis Dvornik, Gorazd was a scion of a noble family. The historian Ján Stanislav speculates that Gorazd could have originated from the region between Bratislava and Nitra (Močenok, Šaľa district). According to Dvornik, Gorazd was a native speaker of the local Slavic dialect but also fluent in Latin, possibly due to being educated in Bavaria and likely Greek. He was among the students and disciples of Saint Methodius and Saint Cyril, the Byzantine missionaries who were invited to the country by Duke Rastislav of Moravia.

The earliest mention of Gorazd likely comes from the Greek manuscript The Long Life of Clement of Ohrid written by archbishop Theophylact of Ohrid (d. 1107) in the late 11th century or early 12th century, on the basis of older Slavic writings that did not survive until modern times. According to this source, Gorazd travelled to Rome with Saints Cyril and Methodius in 867 and was ordained a priest by bishops Gauderich and Formosus (later pope) the following year along with Clement of Ohrid and Naum.

After the death of Saint Methodius (885), Gorazd took over the leadership of the Slavonic liturgy Church in the kingdom of Great Moravia as his designated successor. Nonetheless, it is not clear if Gorazd was consecrated bishop. Dvornik considers it unlikely due to the opposition of Western prelates to Saint Methodius at the time, which was made worse by his choice of a Moravian noble as a successor, which they likely saw as an attempt to sway the local nobility towards Byzantium.

In the same time (885-886), under the influence of Wiching, a Benedictine monk from Alamannia, who was (since 880) Bishop of Nitra, the new Pope Stephen V (885-891) issued a papal bull known as Quia te zelo fidei, forbidding the use of Slavic language in liturgy and sacraments, thus restricting its use only to sermons, for the common people.

On those grounds, Wiching took over the Moravian church with the blessing of the Pope and the new ruler of Moravia king Svatopluk I of Moravia. The bishop was a staunch opponent of the Byzantine influences and accused the missionaries from Byzantium and their disciples of heresy over the filioque controversy and Byzantine-style observation of feasting days. Followers of Cyril and Methodius were thus expelled from Great Moravia, and some of them (Clement, Naum, Angelar) fled to Belgrade, finding refuge in the First Bulgarian Empire. What happened to Gorazd is unknown. According to some later traditions (as reflected in the modern Prologue from Ohrid), Gorazd was among those disciples who fled to Bulgaria.

Nonetheless, the main medieval source for those events, The Long Life of Clement of Ohrid, does not mention Gorazd among the Saint Methodius disciples who fled to Bulgaria. According to Dvornik, Wiching was likely unable to exile Gorazd, as he was of local noble origin and likely could rely on relatives to shelter him, although he too considers it likely Wiching held Gorazd in prison for some time. Dvornik speculates that, after his noble relatives secured his release, Gorazd possibly became a bishop either in Nitra or alternatively in Olomouc or somewhere in the lands of semi-independent Slavic nobles paying tribute to the Hungarians in southeastern Slovakia.

A Polish calendar from the 14th century, the only Western medieval source mentioning Gorazd, confirms the feast of Saint Gorazd was celebrated in Wiślica and claims that the saint had indeed escaped Wiching but not to Bulgaria, but rather to Poland, where he found refuge among the Vistulans.

Since the 19th century, the body of Gorazd is claimed to be buried in the town of Berat in Albania.

== Legacy ==
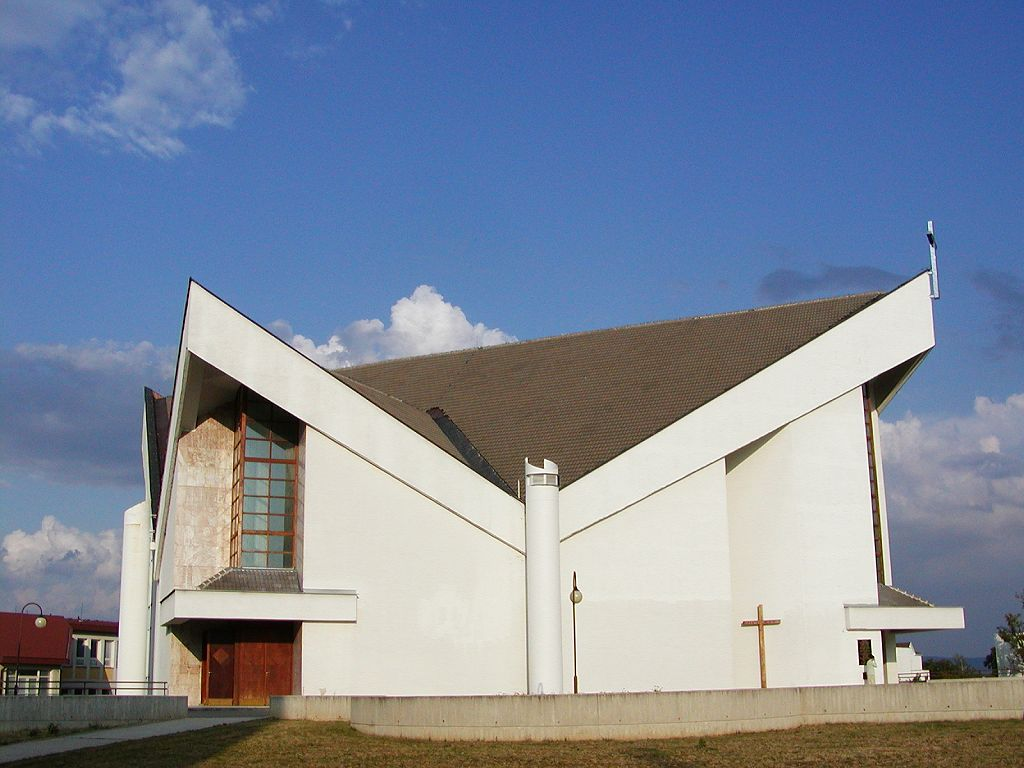
St. Gorazd church in Vrbové, Slovakia

Gorazd was historically venerated since late medieval times in the Eastern Christian churches, particularly in the Slavic lands and in the Balkans. By the 16th century, he was already venerated as one of the Seven Apostles of the Slavs, together with his teachers Cyril and Methodius and fellow students Saint Clement of Ohrid, Saint Naum of Preslav, Saint Angelar and Saint Sava.

The importance of the cult increased during the Bulgarian National Revival.

In the 20th century, his veneration became widespread in both Roman and Byzantine rite Catholic churches in Slovakia. There are 12 churches in Slovakia named after Gorazd and another 2 after the Seven Apostles in Bulgaria, all built between 1993 and 2010.

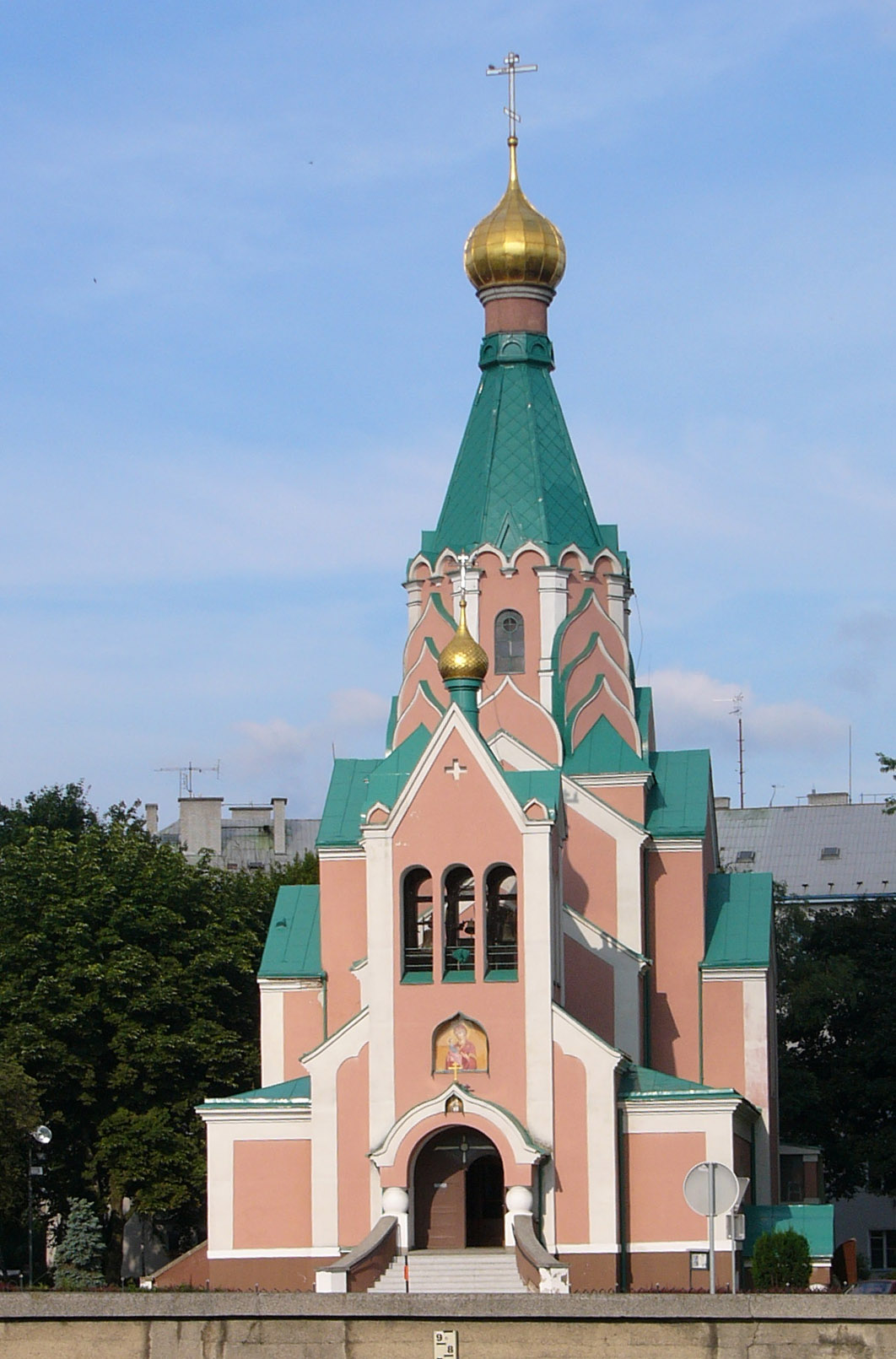
St. Gorazd church in Olomouc, Czechia

The Olomouc Orthodox Church built it 1939, which serves as the Cathedral seat of the Olomouc-Brno eparchy since 1950 is named after Saint Gorazd. The hierarch of the revived Orthodox Church in Czechoslovakia, Saint Gorazd Pavlík, chose his monastic name after Saint Gorazd. Pavlík became ordained Saint himself after being martyred by the Nazis.

The St. Gorazd peak in Antarctica is named after Gorazd.

The Old Church Slavonic Digital Hub, a Czech digital resource for Czech Paleo-Slavonic Studies lexicographical research is named GORAZD after St. Gorazd.

The documentary Fragile Identity by Zuzana Piussi includes a video of a group of Slovak women praying in tongues while traveling to an alleged grave of Gorazd in Albania. The video became viral online, gaining millions of views and generating a number of remixes. The Bishop of the Slovak Catholic Eparchy of Košice Milan Chautur criticized the conduct of women in the video, claiming it was unlikely that the conduct of the women was inspired by the Holy Spirit.

== See also ==
- Seven Apostles of Bulgaria

== Sources ==
- Bowlus, Charles R. (1995). Franks, Moravians, and Magyars: The Struggle for the Middle Danube, 788-907. Philadelphia: University of Pennsylvania Press.
- Duthilleul, Pierre (1935). "Les sources de l'histoire des saints Cyrille et Méthode". Échos d'Orient. 34 (179): 272–306.
- Duthilleul, Pierre (1963). L'évangélisation des slaves: Cyrille et Méthode. Tournai: Desclée.
- Dvornik, Francis (1964). "The Significance of the Missions of Cyril and Methodius". Slavic Review. 23 (2): 195–211.
- Vlasto, Alexis P. (1970). The Entry of the Slavs into Christendom: An Introduction to the Medieval History of the Slavs. Cambridge: Cambridge University Press.
