= Cyril and Methodius =

9th-century Byzantine Christian theologians and missionaries

Saints Cyril and Methodius
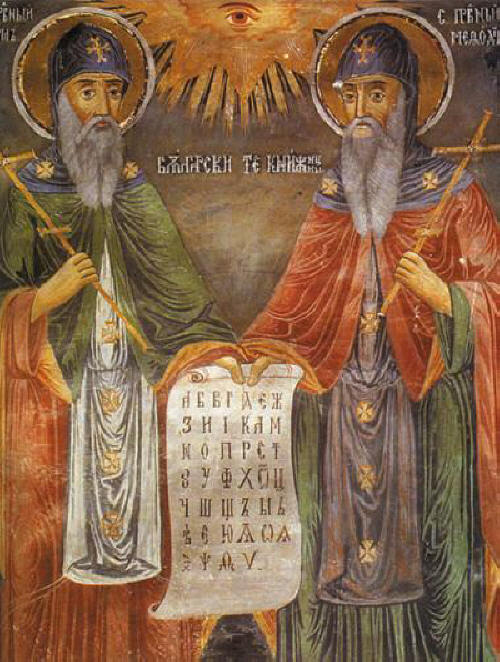
- "Saints Cyril and Methodius holding the Cyrillic alphabet," a mural by Bulgarian iconographer Z. Zograf, 1848, Troyan Monastery

Bishops and Confessors Equals to the Apostles Patrons of Europe Apostles to the Slavs
- Born: 826 or 827 and 815; Thessalonica, Byzantine Empire (present-day Greece)
- Died: 14 February 869 and 6 April 885 (41 or 42 and 70); Rome and Velehrad, Great Moravia
- Venerated in: Eastern Orthodox Church; Catholic Church; Anglican Communion; Lutheranism
- Feast: 11 and 24 May (Eastern Orthodox Church); 14 February (present Latin Catholic calendar); 5 July (Latin Catholic calendar 1880–1886); 7 July (Latin Catholic calendar 1887–1969); 5 July (Latin Catholic and Lutheran Czech Republic and Slovakia)
- Attributes: Brothers depicted together; Eastern bishops holding up a church; Eastern bishops holding an icon of the Last Judgment. Often, Cyril is depicted wearing a monastic habit and Methodius vested as a bishop with omophorion.
- Patronage: Bulgaria, North Macedonia, Czech Republic, Moravia, Slovakia, Transnistria, Serbia, Archdiocese of Ljubljana, Europe, Slovak Eparchy of Toronto, Eparchy of Košice

Cyril (Greek: Κύριλλος, romanized: Kýrillos; born Constantine [Greek: Κωνσταντίνος, romanized: Konstantínos]; 826–869) and Methodius (Μεθόδιος, Methódios; born Michael [Greek: Μιχαήλ, romanized: Michaíl]; 815–885) were brothers, Byzantine Christian theologians and missionaries. For their work evangelizing the Early Slavs, they are known as the "Apostles to the Slavs".

They are credited with devising the Glagolitic alphabet, the first alphabet used to transcribe Old Church Slavonic. After their deaths, their pupils continued their missionary work among other Slavs. Both brothers are venerated in the Eastern Orthodox Church as saints with the title of "equal-to-apostles". In 1880, Pope Leo XIII introduced their feast into the calendar of the Roman Rite of the Catholic Church. In 1980, the first Slav pope, Pope John Paul II declared them co-patron saints of Europe, together with Benedict of Nursia.

== Early career ==
=== Early life ===
The two brothers were born in Thessalonica, at that time in the Byzantine province of the same name (today in Greece) – Cyril in 827–828, and Methodius in 815–820. According to the Vita Cyrilli ("The Life of Cyril"), Cyril was reputedly the youngest of seven brothers; he was born Constantine, but was given the name Cyril upon becoming a monk in Rome shortly before his death. Methodius was born Michael and was given the name Methodius upon becoming a monk in Polychron Monastery at Mysian Olympus (present-day Uludağ in northwest Turkey). Their father was Leo, a droungarios of the Byzantine theme of Thessalonica, and their mother's name was Maria.

The exact ethnic origins of the brothers are unknown; there is controversy as to whether Cyril and Methodius were of Slavic or Greek origin, or both. The two brothers lost their father when Cyril was fourteen, and the powerful minister Theoktistos, who was logothetes tou dromou, one of the chief ministers of the Empire, became their protector. He was also responsible, along with the regent Bardas, for initiating a far-reaching educational program within the Empire which culminated in the establishment of the University of Magnaura, where Cyril was to teach. Cyril was ordained as priest some time after his education, while his brother Methodius remained a deacon until 867/868.

=== Mission to the Khazars ===
About 860, Byzantine Emperor Michael III and the Patriarch of Constantinople Photius, a professor of Cyril's at the university and his guiding light in earlier years, sent Cyril on a missionary expedition to the Khazars who had requested a scholar be sent to them who could converse with Jews and Saracens. It has been claimed that Methodius accompanied Cyril on the mission to the Khazars, but this may be a later invention. The account of his life presented in the Latin "Legenda" claims that he learned the Khazar language while in Chersonesos, in Taurica (modern Crimea).

After his return to Constantinople, Cyril assumed the office of professor of philosophy in the university. His brother by this time had become a significant figure in Byzantine political and administrative affairs, and abbot of his monastery.

== Mission to the Slavs ==
=== Great Moravia ===
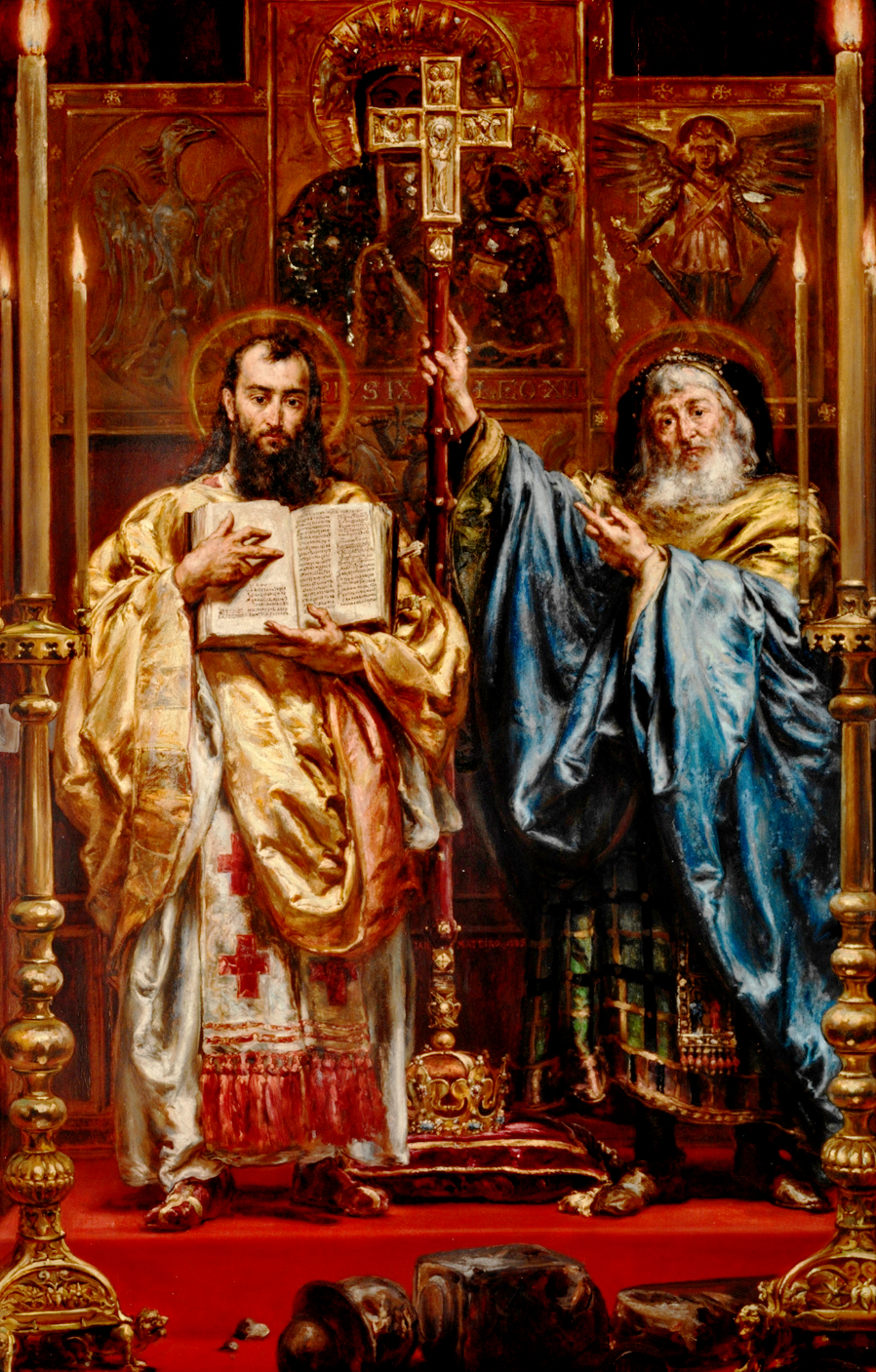
Cyril and Methodius, painting by Jan Matejko, 1885

In 862, the brothers began the work which would give them their historical importance. That year Prince Rastislav of Great Moravia requested that Emperor Michael III and Patriarch Photius send missionaries to evangelize his Slavic subjects. His motives in doing so were probably more political than religious. Rastislav became King with the support of the Frankish ruler Louis the German, though he subsequently sought to assert his independence from the Franks. That Cyril and Methodius might have been the first to bring Christianity to Moravia is a common misconception; Rastislav's letter to Michael III stated clearly that his people "had already rejected paganism and adhere to the Christian law." Rastislav is said to have expelled missionaries of the Roman Church and instead turned to Constantinople for ecclesiastical assistance and, presumably, political support. The Emperor quickly chose to send Cyril, accompanied by his brother Methodius. The request provided a convenient opportunity to expand Byzantine influence. Their first work seems to have been the training of assistants. In 863 they began translating the Gospels and essential liturgical books into what is now known as Old Church Slavonic, and travelled to Great Moravia to promote it. This endeavour was amply rewarded. However, they came into conflict with German clerics, who opposed their efforts to create a specifically Slavic liturgy.

For the purpose of this mission, they devised the Glagolitic script, the first alphabet to be used for Slavonic manuscripts. The Glagolitic alphabet was suited to match the specific features of the Slavonic language. Many languages continue to use its descendant script, Cyrillic.

The brothers wrote the first Slavic Civil Code, which was used in Great Moravia. Many Orthodox churches and some Eastern Catholic churches continue to use the language derived from Old Church Slavonic, known as Church Slavonic, in their liturgies.

Exactly how much the brothers translated is impossible to know. The New Testament and the Psalms seem to have been the first, followed by other lessons from the Old Testament. The "Translatio" speaks only of a version of the Gospels by Cyril, and the "Vita Methodii" only of the "evangelium Slovenicum", though other liturgical selections may also have been translated.

Nor is it known for certain which liturgy, whether of Rome or Constantinople, they used as a source. They may well have used the Roman alphabet, as hinted by liturgical fragments adhering closely to the Latin type. This view is confirmed by the "Prague Fragments" and by certain Old Glagolitic liturgical fragments brought from Jerusalem to Kiev and discovered there by Izmail Sreznevsky—probably the oldest document in the Slavonic tongue; examples of where they resemble the Latin type include the words "Mass", "Preface", and the name of one "Felicitas". Regardless, the circumstances were such that the brothers could have hoped for no lasting success without authorization from Rome.

=== Journey to Rome and death of Cyril ===
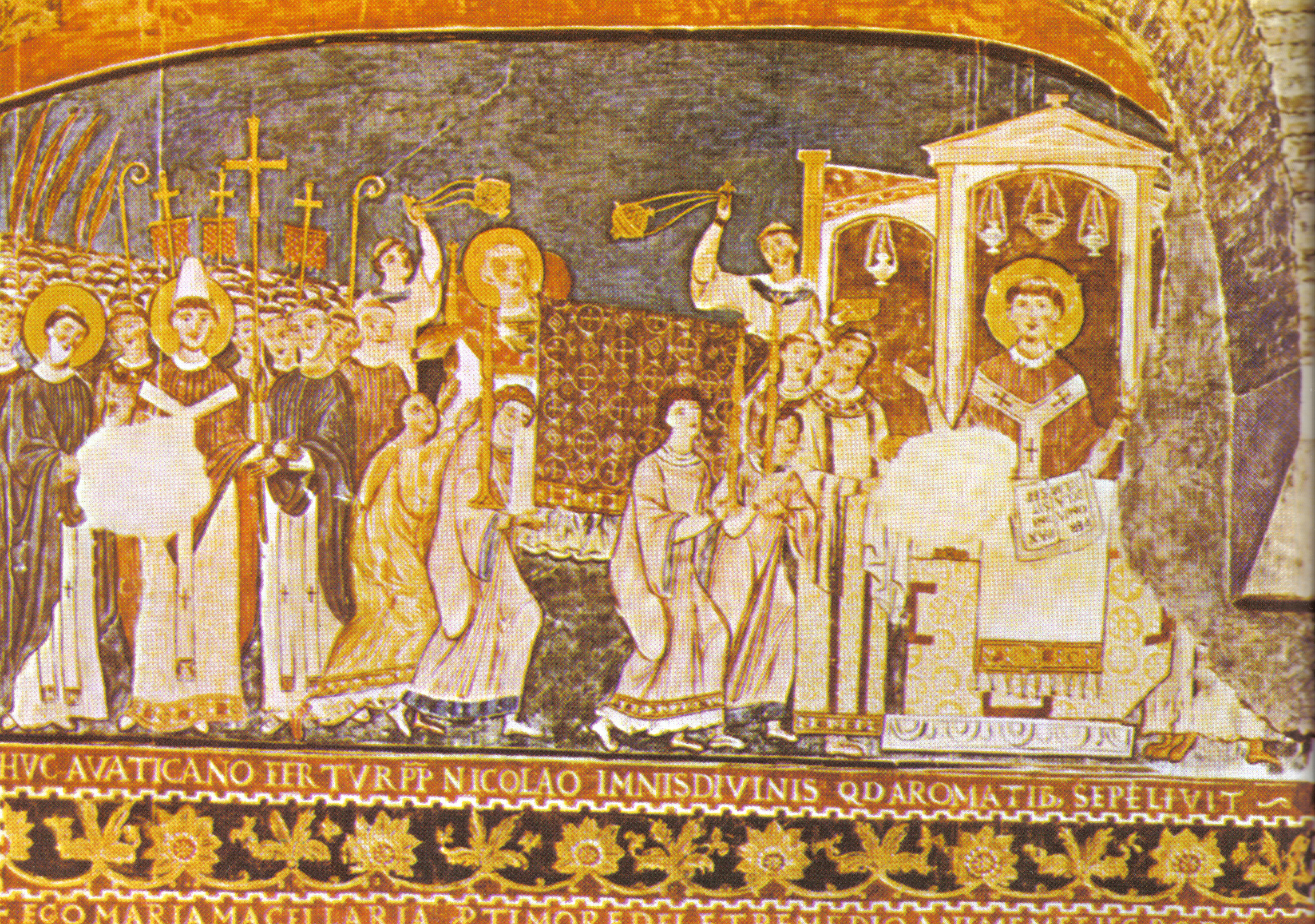
Saints Cyril and Methodius in Rome. Fresco in San Clemente.

The mission of Cyril and Methodius had great success among Slavs in part because they used the people's native language rather than Latin or Greek. In Great Moravia, Cyril and Methodius also encountered missionaries from East Francia, who would have represented the western, i. e. Latin, Church; epitomized the Carolingian Empire that Charlemagne established; and been intent on linguistic, cultural, and liturgical uniformity with its Roman Rite in Latin. They regarded Moravia and the Slavs as subject to their rightful missionary territory.

When friction developed with these western missionaries, the brothers, unwilling to cause dissension with fellow Catholics, decided to travel to Rome to consult the Pope as to a solution that would avoid quarrelling between missionaries in the field. In 867 Pope Nicholas I (858-67) invited the brothers to Rome. Their evangelical mission in Moravia by this time had become the focus of a dispute with Archbishop Adalwin of Salzburg (859–73) and Bishop Ermanrich of Passau (866-74), who claimed ecclesiastical jurisdiction of the same territory and desired converts there to use the Roman Rite exclusively.

With them they brought the relics of Pope Saint Clement I and many disciples. They passed through Pannonia (the Balaton Principality), where Prince Koceľ received them well. Their activity in Pannonia made inevitable the continuation of conflicts with the German episcopate, and especially with the Bishop of Salzburg, whose prerogative Pannonia had been for 75 years. As early as 865, Bishop Adalwin exercised episcopal rights there. The administration under him was in the hands of Archpriest Riehbald. He was obliged to retire to Salzburg, though his superior was instinctively disinclined to abandon his claim.

The brothers sought support from Rome, and were received warmly there in 868. This was partly because they brought the relics of Saint Clement, and rivalry with the Patriarchate of Constantinople regarding the territory of the Slavs would have inclined Rome to value the brothers and their influence.

In Rome the brothers were praised for their learning and cultivated for their influence in Constantinople. Anastasius Bibliothecarius later called Cyril "a man of apostolic life" and "a man of great wisdom". The new Pope Adrian II (867-72) gave Papal support to their mission in Moravia and formally authorized use of the new Slavic liturgy of the brothers.

Subsequently, the Pope himself ordained Methodius as priest, and five Slavic disciples were ordained: Saint Gorazd, Saint Clement of Ohrid, and Saint Naum as priests and Saint Angelar and Saint Sava as deacons by the prominent bishops Formosus and Gauderic. Since the 10th century Cyril and Methodius and these five disciples have been venerated together by the Bulgarian Orthodox Church as the "Seven Saints". The new priests officiated in their own language at the altars of some of the principal churches.

Sensing his death approaching, Cyril, theretofore known as Constantine, became a Basilian monk and was given the new name Cyril. He died in Rome 50 days later on 14 February 869. There is some question whether he had been ordained as a bishop, as is asserted in the Translatio (IX). Upon the death of Cyril, Methodius was given the title of Archbishop of Sirmium (modern Sremska Mitrovica, in Serbia) with jurisdiction of all of Moravia and Pannonia, and authority to celebrate the Slavonic Liturgy. The statement of the "Vita" that Methodius was ordained as a bishop in 870 and not elevated to the dignity of archbishop until 873 is contradicted by the brief of Pope John VIII of June 879, according to which Pope Adrian consecrated him archbishop; John included in his jurisdiction Serbia in addition to Great Moravia and Pannonia.

=== Second mission of Methodius ===
Methodius' signature in the confraternity book (CH-001864-5 Ms. Rh. hist. 27 f. 40r)

Methodius continued the mission among the Slavs alone; not at first in Great Moravia, but in Pannonia, specifically in the Balaton Principality. Political circumstances in Great Moravia were insecure. Rastislav had been taken captive by his nephew, Svatopluk in 870, then delivered to Carloman of Bavaria, and condemned in a diet in Regensburg in late 870. Meanwhile, the East Frankish rulers and their bishops tried to depose Methodius. The archiepiscopal authority of Methodius was considered so threatening to the jurisdiction of Salzburg that he was captured and forced to answer to the East Frankish bishops Adalwin of Salzburg, Ermanrich of Passau, and Anno of Freising. After heated discussion, they declared Methodius deposed and ordered him to be sent to a monastery in modern Germany, where he was imprisoned for two and one half years.

The location of Methodius' imprisonment was not recorded in the Vita Methodii, but relatively recent scholarship identified a set of signatures in the Reichenau Confraternity Book that lends credence to the proposal that it was at Reichenau Abbey. First comes Methodius' own signature, writing with such pressure that he broke the nib. The same hand then wrote the following names below it, presumably his entourage: Λεον, Ιγνατιος, Ϊοακιν, Συμεον, and Δραγαϊς. None of these names were recorded in surviving sources, but the last one is Slavic.

Notwithstanding strong representations of the Conversio Bagoariorum et Carantanorum of 871, written to persuade the Pope though not conceding this purpose, Rome declared emphatically for Methodius. The Pope sent Paul, Bishop of Ancona to reinstate him and punish his enemies, after which both parties were ordered to appear in Rome with the legate. Thus, in 873 new Pope John VIII (872-82) secured the release of Methodius, but ordered him to cease celebrating the new Slavonic Liturgy.

=== Final years of Methodius ===
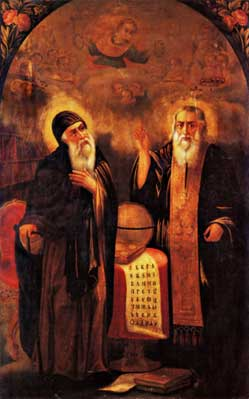
Saint Cyril and Methodius by Stanislav Dospevski, Bulgarian painter

The Papal will prevailed, and Methodius secured his freedom and his archiepiscopal jurisdiction of Great Moravia and Pannonia, albeit without permission to celebrate the new Slavonic Liturgy. His authority in Pannonia was restricted after the death of Koceľ, when German nobles administered the principality. However, Svatopluk then practically independently ruled Greater Moravia, and he expelled the German clergy. This seemingly secured an unimpeded field of operation for Methodius, and the Vita (X) described the next few years (873–9) as being fruitful for his mission. Methodius seemingly disregarded, wholly or partly, the prohibition on celebrating the Slavonic Liturgy. When Frankish clerics again ventured into his territory, revealing a permissive Svatopluk at odds with his punctilious archbishop, this became a cause of complaint against Methodius in Rome, coupled with accusation regarding the Filioque.

In 878 Methodius was summoned to Rome on accusations of heresy and celebrating the Slavonic Liturgy. This time Pope John was convinced by the arguments that Methodius made in his defence and sent him back acquitted of all charges, and with permission to celebrate the Slavonic Liturgy. The Carolingian bishop who succeeded him, Wiching, a Swabian, suppressed the Slavonic Liturgy and compelled the disciples of Methodius into exile. Many found refuge with Knyaz Boris the Baptizer in Bulgaria, under whom they organized a Slavic-speaking church. Meanwhile, the successors of Pope John instituted a rule to celebrate only in Latin, which endured for centuries.

Methodius vindicated his orthodoxy and promised to obey the rule regarding celebration of the Liturgy. He could the more easily defend his omission of Filioque from the Nicene Creed as this also pertained in Rome at the time. Though Filioque could, by the 6th century, be heard in some Roman Rite churches in the west, it was not until 1014 that Rome followed suit (see Nicene Creed). Critics of Methodius were mollified by Methodius accepting the appointment of Wiching as his coadjutor. When relations between the two factions again became strained, Pope John VIII steadfastly supported Methodius. After his death in December 882, it was the archbishop himself whose position seemed insecure. His need for political support, visiting the Eastern Emperor, inclined Goetz to accept the account in the Vita (XIII).

Methodius died on 6 April 885 and his body was buried in the main cathedral church of Great Moravia. It still remains an open question which city was the capital of Great Moravia. As a result the location of his body remains uncertain.

Upon the death of Methodius an animosity erupted into conflict. Among the disciples of Cyril and Methodius, Clement of Ohrid headed the struggle against the German clergy in Great Moravia along with Gorazd. Gorazd, whom Methodius had designated as his successor, was not recognised by Pope Stephen V, who also forbade celebration of the Slavonic Liturgy and appointed as successor to Methodius the infamous Wiching who promptly sent disciples of Cyril and Methodius into exile from Great Moravia.

After spending time in prison, Clement was expelled from Great Moravia, and in 885 or 6 reached the borders of the First Bulgarian Empire together with Saint Naum, Saint Angelar, and possibly also Gorazd (other sources suggest Gorazd had already died). Angelar soon died after arrival, but Clement and Naum were afterwards sent to the Bulgarian capital of Pliska, where they were commissioned by Boris I to instruct the future clergy of the polity in the Slavonic language. Eventually they were commissioned to establish two theological schools: the Ohrid Literary School in Ohrid and the Preslav Literary School in Preslav. The Preslav Literary School originally had been established in Pliska, but was moved to Preslav in 893.

== Invention of the Glagolitic and Cyrillic alphabets ==
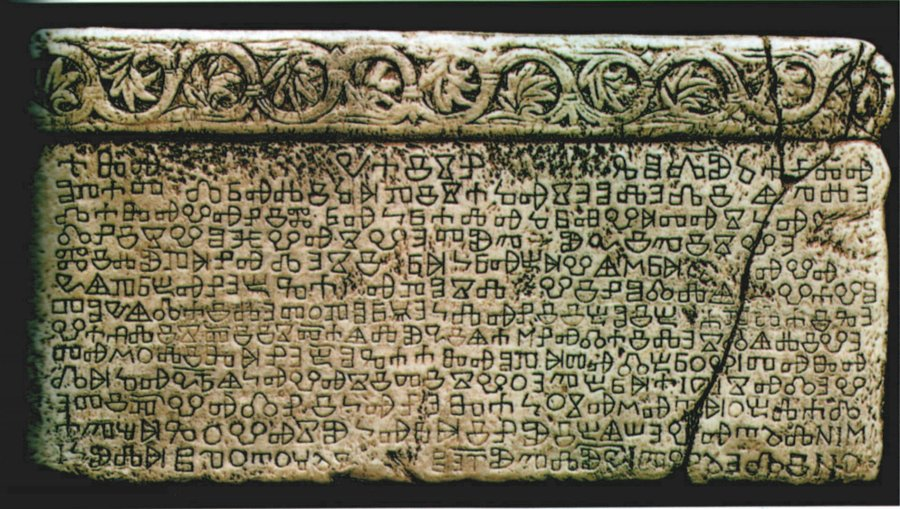
The Baška tablet is an early example of the Glagolitic from Croatia.

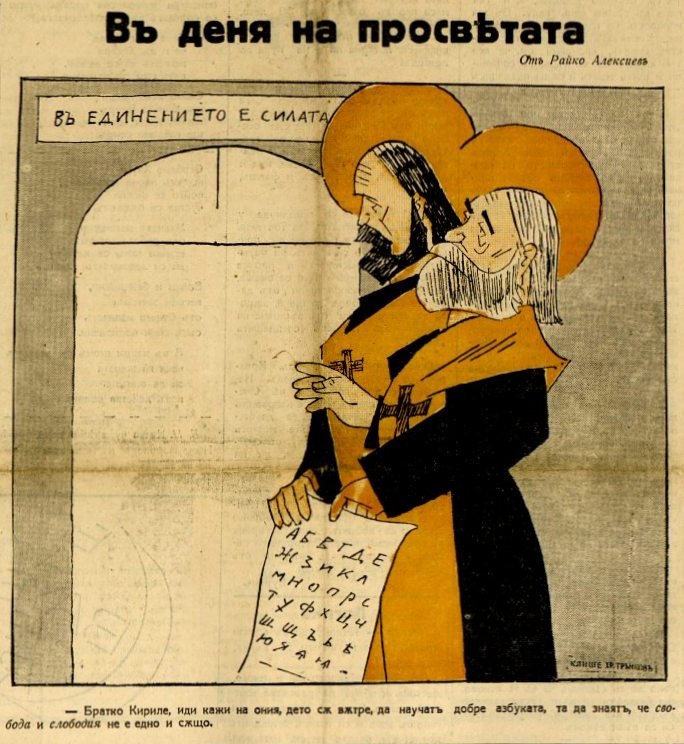
A cartoon about Saints Cyril and Methodius from Bulgaria in 1938. The caption reads : Brother Cyril, go tell those who are inside to learn the alphabet so they know freedom (Bulgarian: свобода) and anarchy (Bulgarian: слободия) are not the same.

The Glagolitic and Cyrillic alphabets are the oldest known Slavic alphabets, and were created by the two brothers and/or their students, to translate the Gospels and liturgical books into the Slavic languages.

The early Glagolitic alphabet was used in Great Moravia between 863 (the arrival of Cyril and Methodius) and 885 (the expulsion of their students) for government and religious documents and books, and at the Great Moravian Academy (Veľkomoravské učilište) founded by Cyril, where followers of Cyril and Methodius were educated, by Methodius himself among others. The alphabet has been traditionally attributed to Cyril. That seems confirmed explicitly by the papal letter Industriae tuae (880) approving the use of Old Church Slavonic, which says that the alphabet was "invented by Constantine the Philosopher". "Invention" need not exclude the brothers having possibly made use of earlier letterforms. Before that time the Slavic languages had no distinct script of their own.

The early Cyrillic alphabet was developed by the disciples of Saints Cyril and Methodius at the Preslav Literary School at the end of the 9th century as a simplification of the Glagolitic alphabet which more closely resembled the Greek alphabet. The Cyrillic script was devised from the Greek alphabet and Glagolitic alphabet. Cyrillic gradually replaced Glagolitic as the alphabet of the Old Church Slavonic language, which became the official language of the First Bulgarian Empire and later spread to the Eastern Slav lands of Kievan Rus'. Cyrillic eventually spread throughout most of the Slavic world to become the standard alphabet in the Eastern Orthodox Slavic countries. In this way the work of Cyril and Methodius and their disciples enabled the spread of Christianity throughout Eastern Europe.

After the adoption of Christianity in 865, religious ceremonies in Bulgaria were conducted in Greek by clergy sent from the Byzantine Empire. Fearing growing Byzantine influence and weakening of the state, Boris viewed the adoption of the Old Slavonic language as a way to preserve the political independence and stability of Bulgaria, so he established two literary schools (academies), in Pliska and Ohrid, where theology was to be taught in the Slavonic language. While Naum of Preslav stayed in Pliska working on the foundation of the Pliska Literary School which was moved to Preslav in 893, Clement was commissioned by Boris I to organise the teaching of theology to future clergymen in Old Church Slavonic at the Ohrid Literary School. Over seven years (886-893) Clement taught some 3,500 students in the Slavonic language and the Glagolitic alphabet.

== Commemoration ==
=== Saints Cyril and Methodius' Day ===
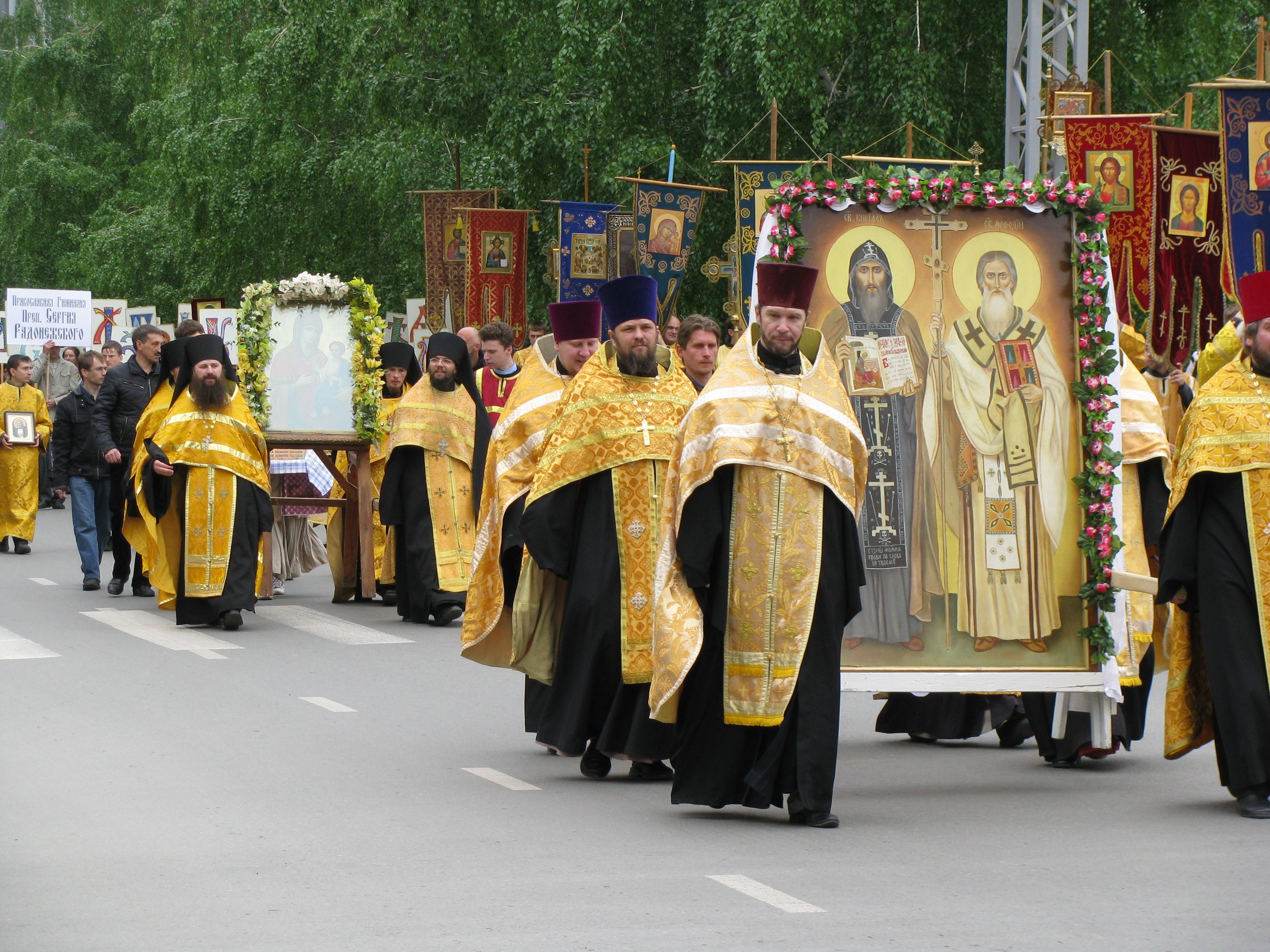
Saints Cyril and Methodius procession

Compared to nowadays, the process leading to canonization was less involved in the decades following Cyril's death. Cyril was regarded by his disciples as a saint soon after his death. His following spread among the nations he evangelized, and subsequently to the wider Christian Church. With his brother Methodius, he was famous as a man of holiness. From the crowds lining the Roman streets during his funeral procession, there were calls for Cyril to be accorded saintly status. The brothers' first appearance in a papal document is in Grande Munus of Leo XIII in 1880. They are known as the "Apostles of the Slavs", and are still highly regarded by both Catholic and Orthodox Christians. Their feast day is currently celebrated on 14 February in the Catholic Church (to coincide with the date of St Cyril's death); on 11 May in the Eastern Orthodox Church (though for Eastern Orthodox Churches which use the Julian Calendar this is 24 May according to the Gregorian calendar); and on 7 July according to the old sanctoral calendar before the revisions of the Second Vatican Council. The celebration also commemorates the introduction of literacy and the preaching of the gospels in the Slavonic language by the brothers. The brothers were declared "Patrons of Europe" in 1980.

The first recorded secular celebration of Saints Cyril and Methodius' Day as the "Day of the Bulgarian script", as traditionally accepted by Bulgarian history, was held in the town of Plovdiv on 11 May 1851. At the same time a local Bulgarian school was named "Saints Cyril and Methodius". Both acts had been instigated by the prominent Bulgarian educator Nayden Gerov. However, an Armenian traveller referred to a "celebration of the Bulgarian script" when he visited the town of Shumen on 22 May 1803.

Cyril and Methodius are remembered in the Church of England with a Lesser Festival and with a lesser feast on the Episcopal Church calendar on 14 February.

The day is now celebrated as a public holiday in the following countries:

- In Bulgaria it is celebrated on 24 May and is known as the "Bulgarian Education and Culture, and Slavonic Script Day" (Bulgarian: Ден на българската просвета и култура и на славянската писменост), a national holiday celebrating Bulgarian culture and literature as well as the alphabet. It is also known as "Alphabet, Culture, and Education Day" (Bulgarian: Ден на азбуката, културата и просвещението). Saints Cyril and Methodius are patrons of the National Library of Bulgaria. There is a monument to them in front of the library. Saints Cyril and Methodius are the most celebrated saints in the Bulgarian Orthodox church, and icons of the two brothers can be found in every church.
- In North Macedonia, it is celebrated on 24 May and is known as the "Saints Cyril and Methodius, Slavonic Enlighteners' Day" (Macedonian: Св. Кирил и Методиј, Ден на словенските просветители), a national holiday. The Government of the Republic of Macedonia enacted a statute of the national holiday in October 2006 and the Parliament of the Republic of Macedonia passed a corresponding law at the beginning of 2007. Previously it had only been celebrated in the schools. It is also known as the day of the "Solun Brothers" (Macedonian: Солунските браќа).
- In the Czech Republic and Slovakia, the two brothers were originally commemorated on 9 March, but Pope Pius IX changed this date to 5 July for several reasons. Today, Saints Cyril and Methodius are revered there as national saints and their name day (5 July), "Sts Cyril and Methodius Day" is a national holiday in Czech Republic and Slovakia. In the Czech Republic it is celebrated as "Slavic Missionaries Cyril and Methodius Day" (Czech: Den slovanských věrozvěstů Cyrila a Metoděje); in Slovakia it is celebrated as "St. Cyril and Metod Day" (Slovak: Sviatok svätého Cyrila a Metoda).
- In Russia, it is celebrated on 24 May and is known as the "Slavonic Literature and Culture Day" (Russian: День славянской письменности и культуры), celebrating Slavonic culture and literature as well as the alphabet. Its celebration is ecclesiastical (11 May in the Church's Julian calendar). It is not a public holiday in Russia.

The saints' feast day is celebrated by the Eastern Orthodox Church on 11 May and by the Catholic Church and the Anglican Communion on 14 February as "Saints Cyril and Methodius Day". The Lutheran Churches of Western Christianity commemorate the two saints either on 14 February or 11 May. The Byzantine Rite Lutheran Churches celebrate Saints Cyril and Methodius Day on 24 May.

=== Other commemoration ===
The national library of Bulgaria in Sofia, Ss. Cyril and Methodius University of Skopje in the North Macedonia, and St. Cyril and St. Methodius University of Veliko Tarnovo in Bulgaria and in Trnava, Slovakia, bear the name of the two saints. Faculty of Theology at Palacký University in Olomouc (Czech Republic), bears the name "Saints Cyril and Methodius Faculty of Theology". In the United States, SS. Cyril and Methodius Seminary in Orchard Lake, Michigan, bears their name.

The Brotherhood of Saints Cyril and Methodius established in 1846 was short-lived a pro-Ukrainian organization in the Russian Empire to preserve Ukrainian national identity.

Saints Cyril and Methodius are the main patron saints of the Archdiocese of Ljubljana. Ljubljana Cathedral stands at Cyril and Methodius Square (Slovene: Ciril–Metodov trg). They are also patron saints of the Greek-Catholic Eparchy of Košice (Slovakia) and the Slovak Greek Catholic Eparchy of Toronto.

St. Cyril Peak and St. Methodius Peak in the Tangra Mountains on Livingston Island, South Shetland Islands, in Antarctica are named for the brothers.

Saint Cyril's remains are interred in a shrine-chapel within the Basilica di San Clemente in Rome. The chapel holds a Madonna by Sassoferrato.

The Basilica of SS. Cyril and Methodius in Danville, Pennsylvania, (the only Catholic basilica dedicated to SS. Cyril and Methodius in the world) is the motherhouse chapel of the Sisters of SS. Cyril and Methodius, a Catholic women's religious community of pontifical right dedicated to apostolic works of ecumenism, education, evangelization, and elder care.

The Order of Saints Cyril and Methodius, originally founded in 1909, is part of the national award system of Bulgaria.

In 2021, a research vessel newly acquired by the Bulgarian Navy was re-christened Ss. Cyril and Methodius after the saints, with actress Maria Bakalova as the sponsor.

== Gallery ==
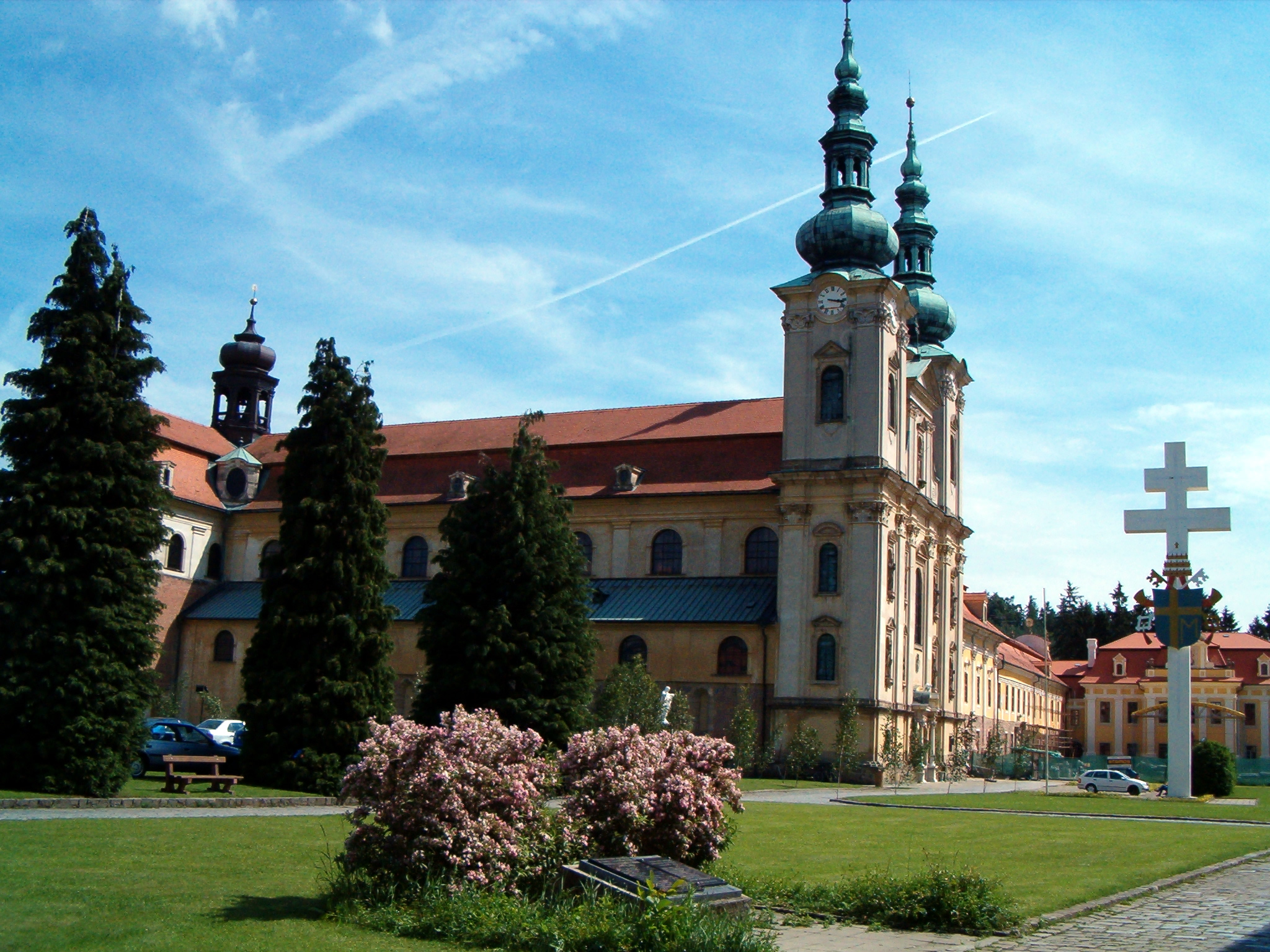
Basilica of St.Cyril and Methodius in Moravian Velehrad, Czech Republic

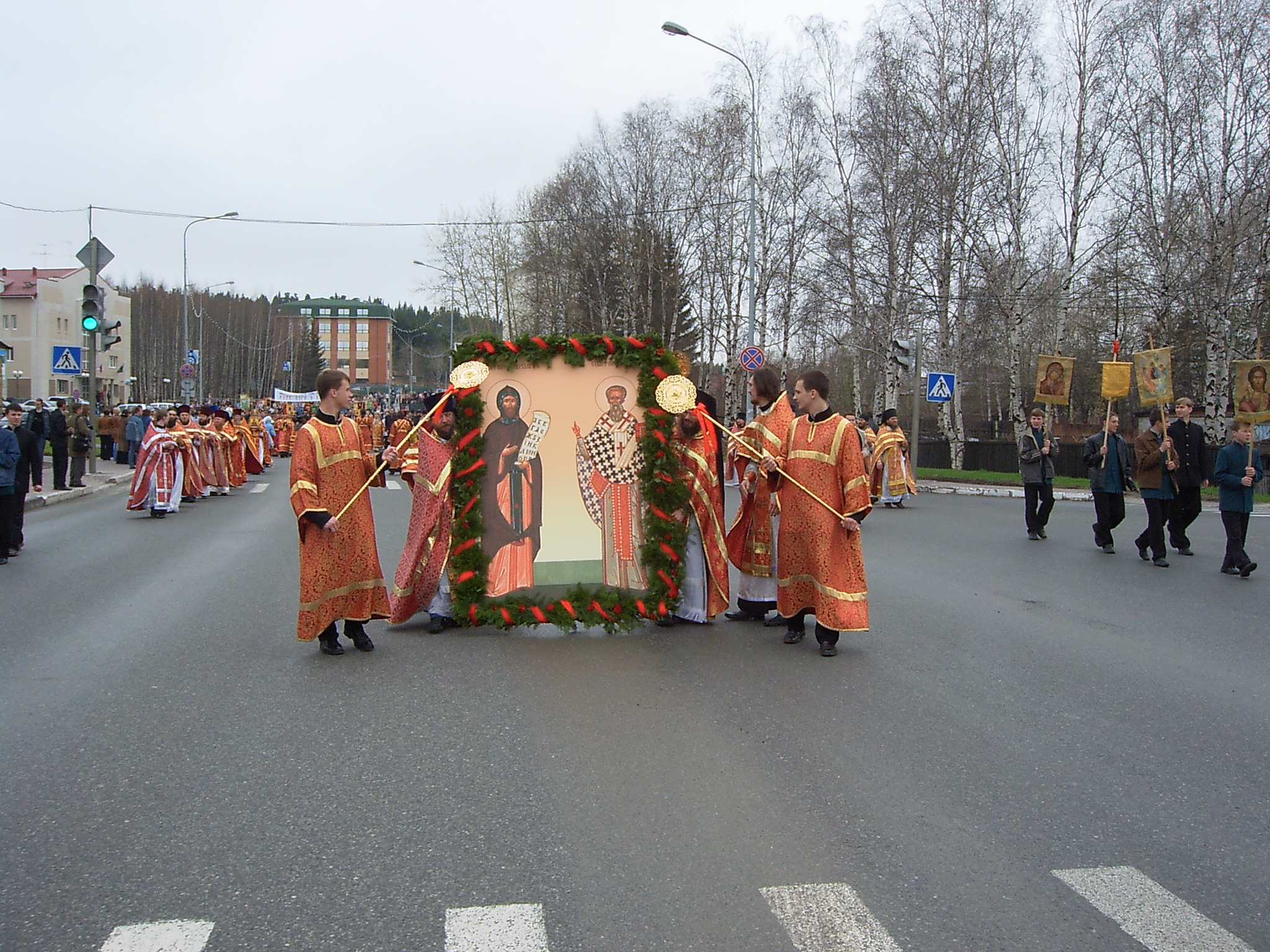
Cross Procession in Khanty-Mansiysk on Saints Cyril and Methodius Day in May 2006

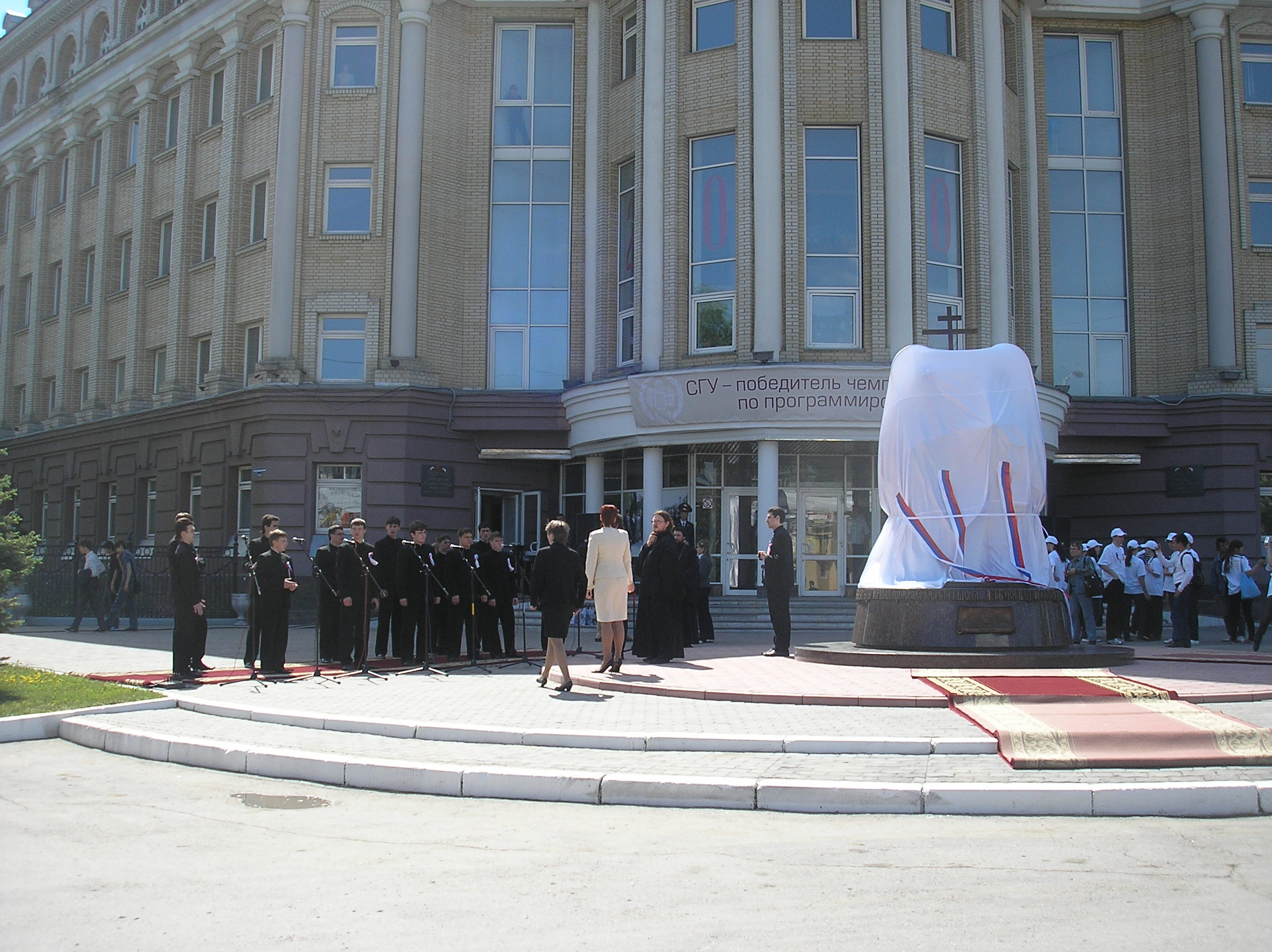
Inauguration of the monument to Saints Cyril and Methodius in Saratov on Slavonic Literature and Culture Day

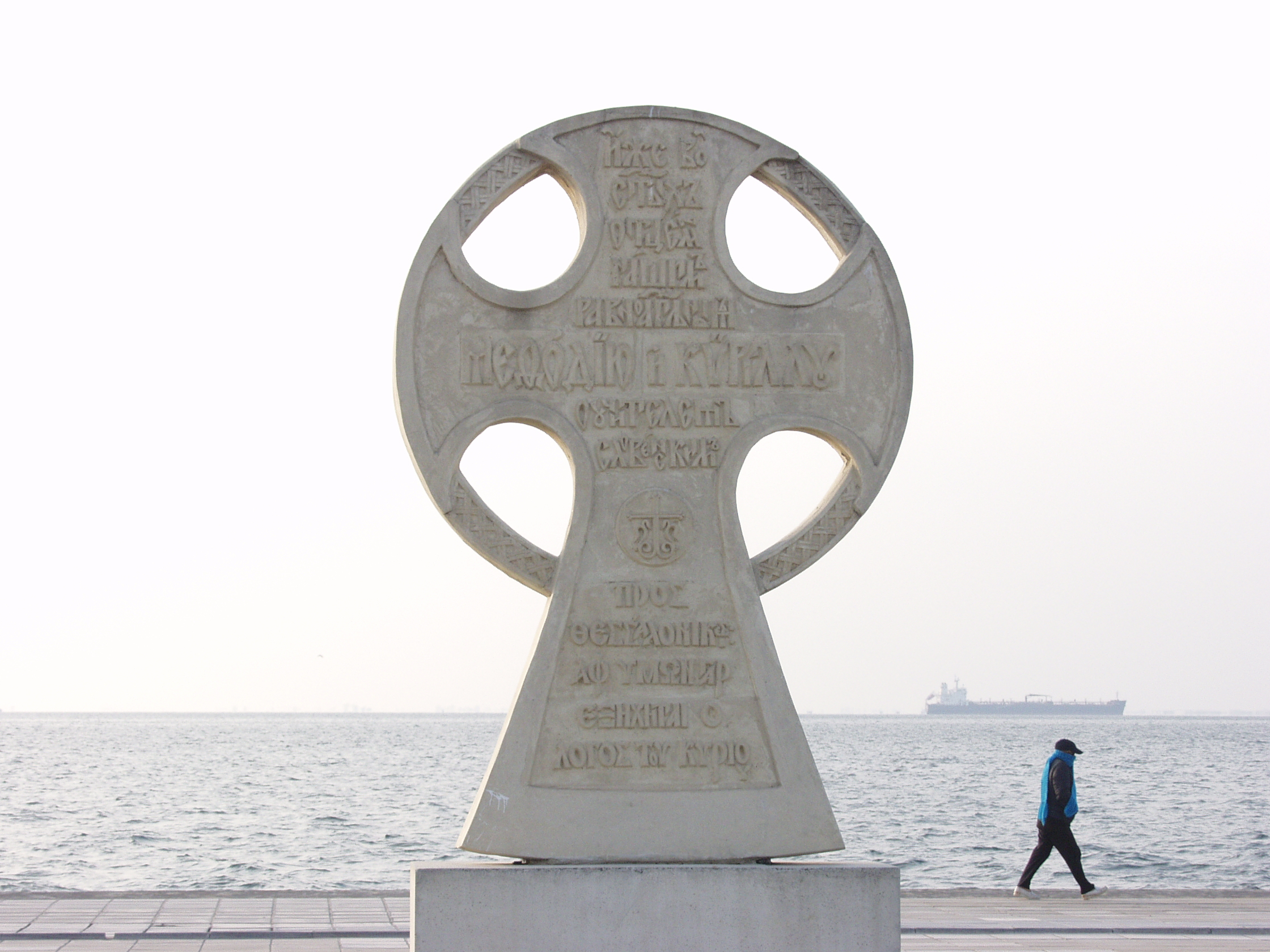
Thessaloniki - monument of the two Saints gift from the Bulgarian Orthodox Church

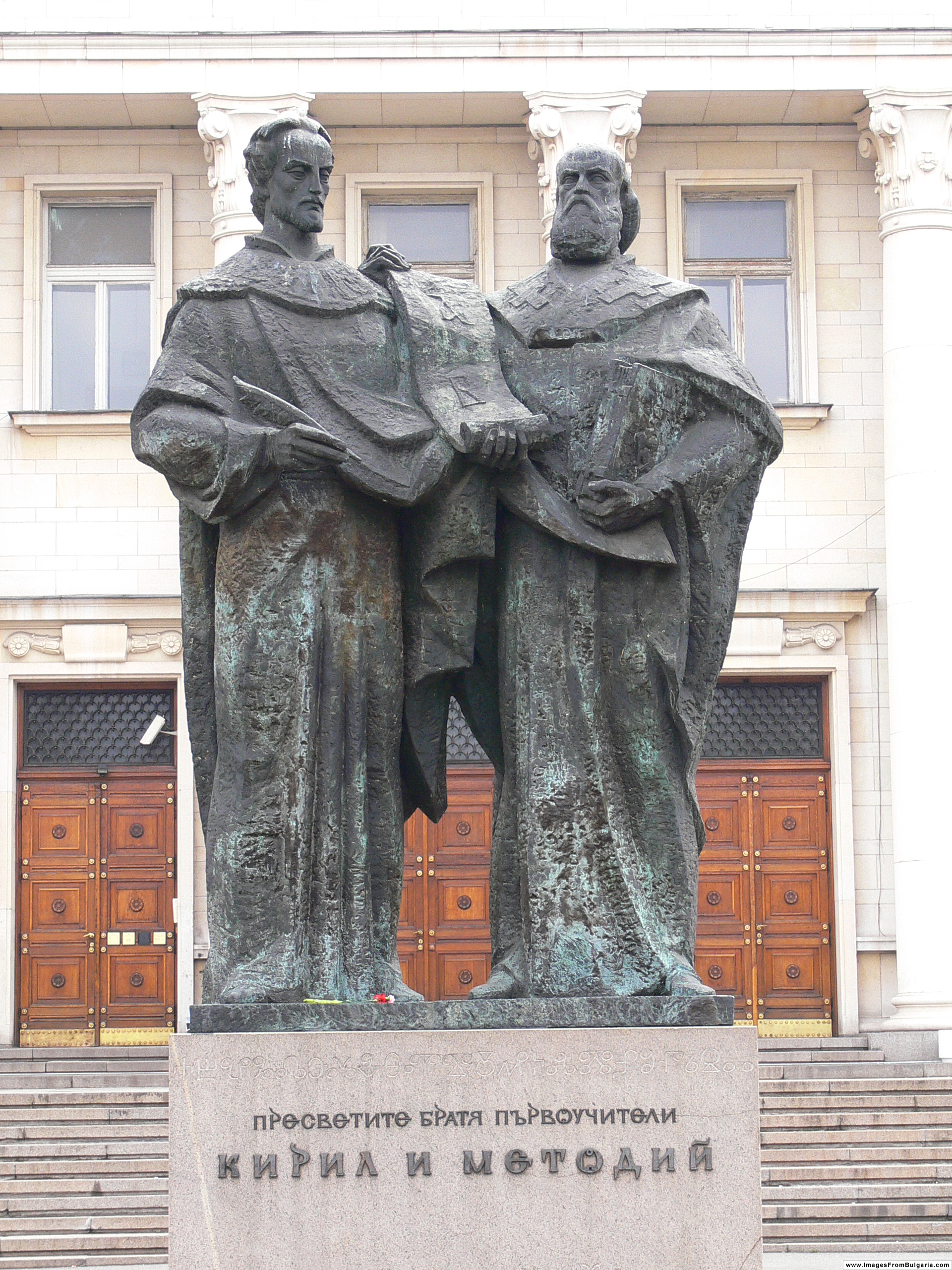
Bulgaria - Statue of the two Saints in front of the SS. Cyril and Methodius National Library in Sofia

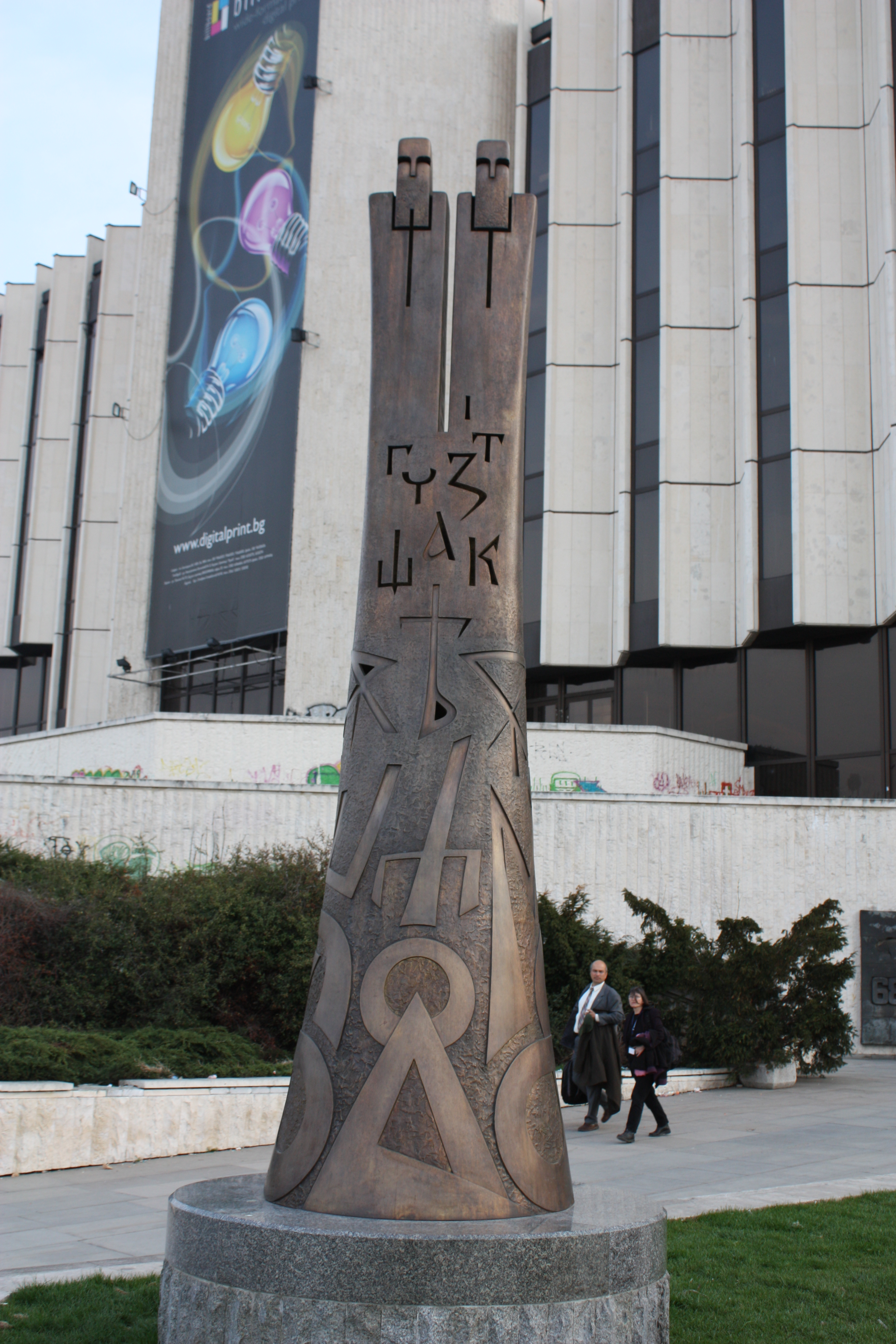
Bulgaria - Statue of the two Saints in front of the National Palace of Culture in Sofia

North Macedonia - The monument in Ohrid

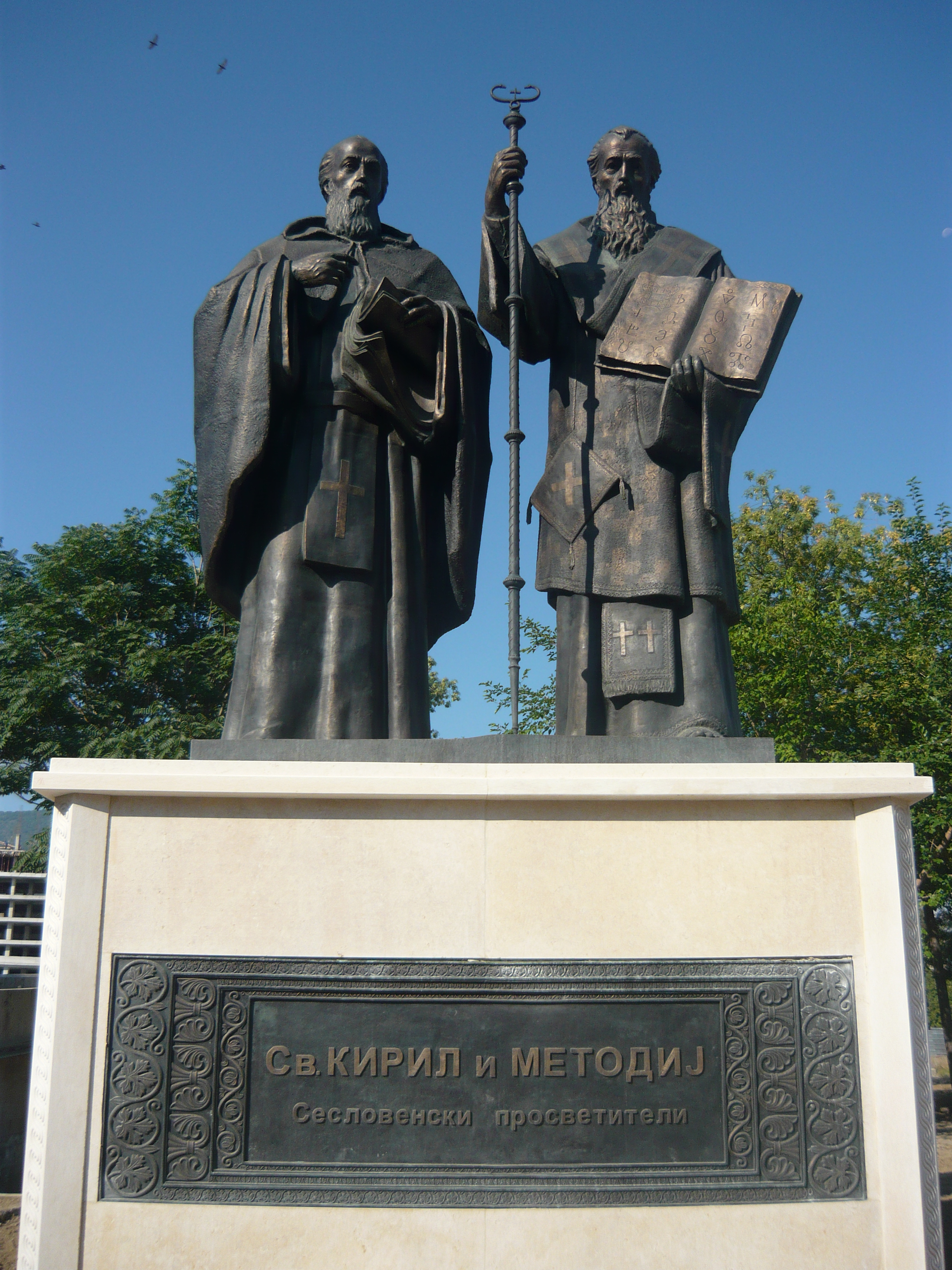
North Macedonia - Statue of Cyril and Methodius near the Stone Bridge in Skopje

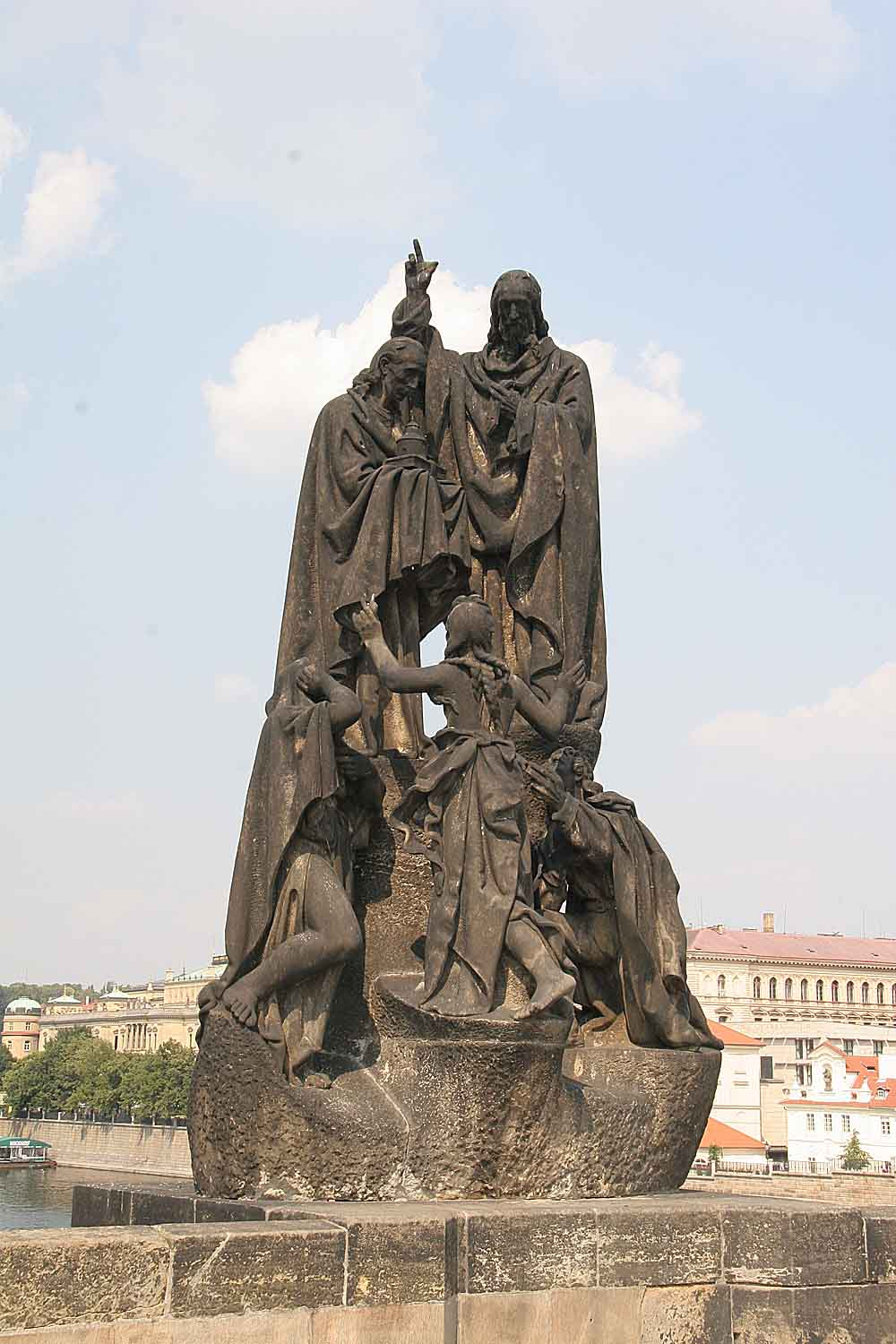
Czech Republic - Statue of Saints Cyril and Methodius at the Charles Bridge in Prague

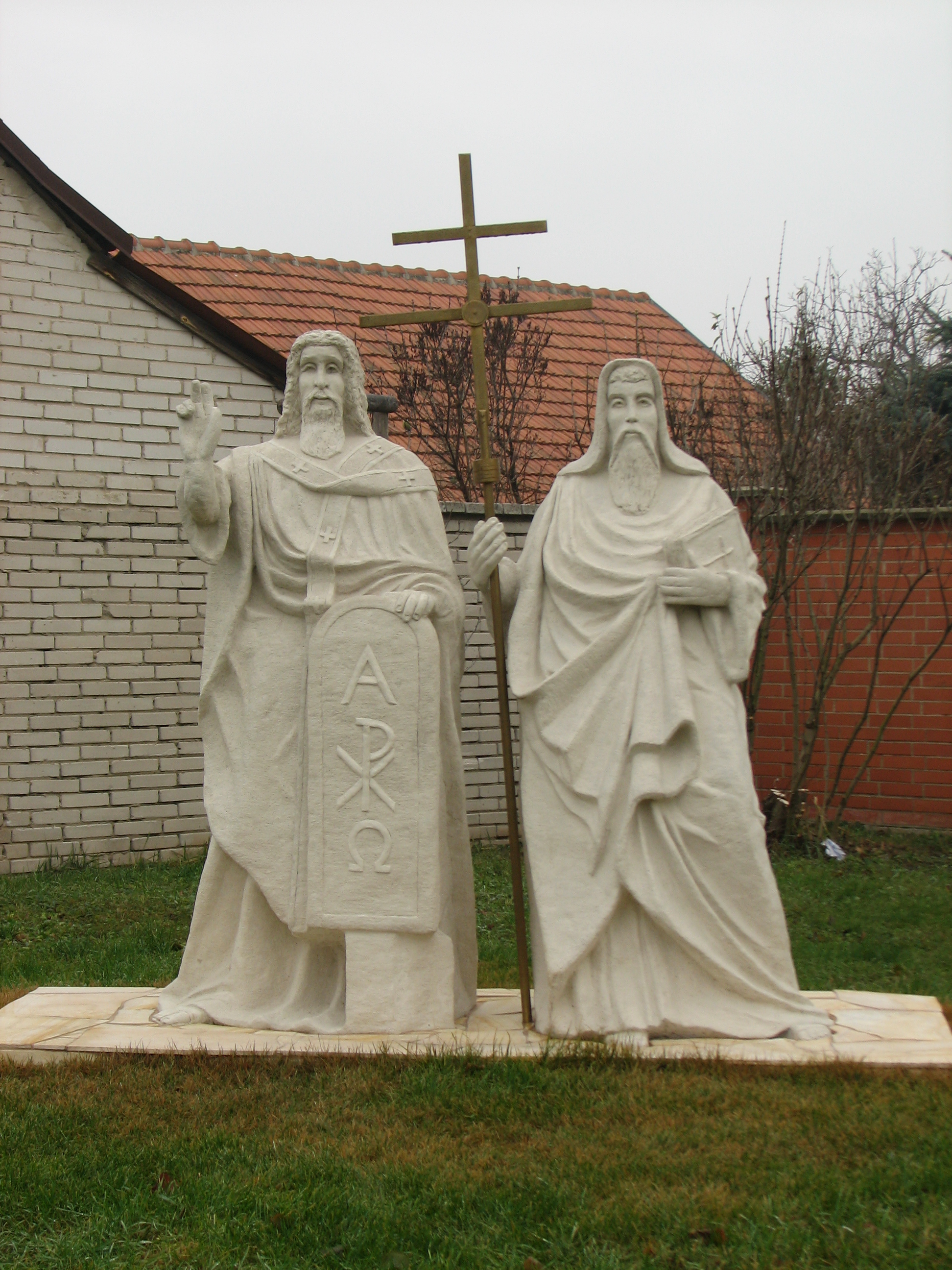
Czech Republic - Saints Cyril and Methodius monument in Mikulčice

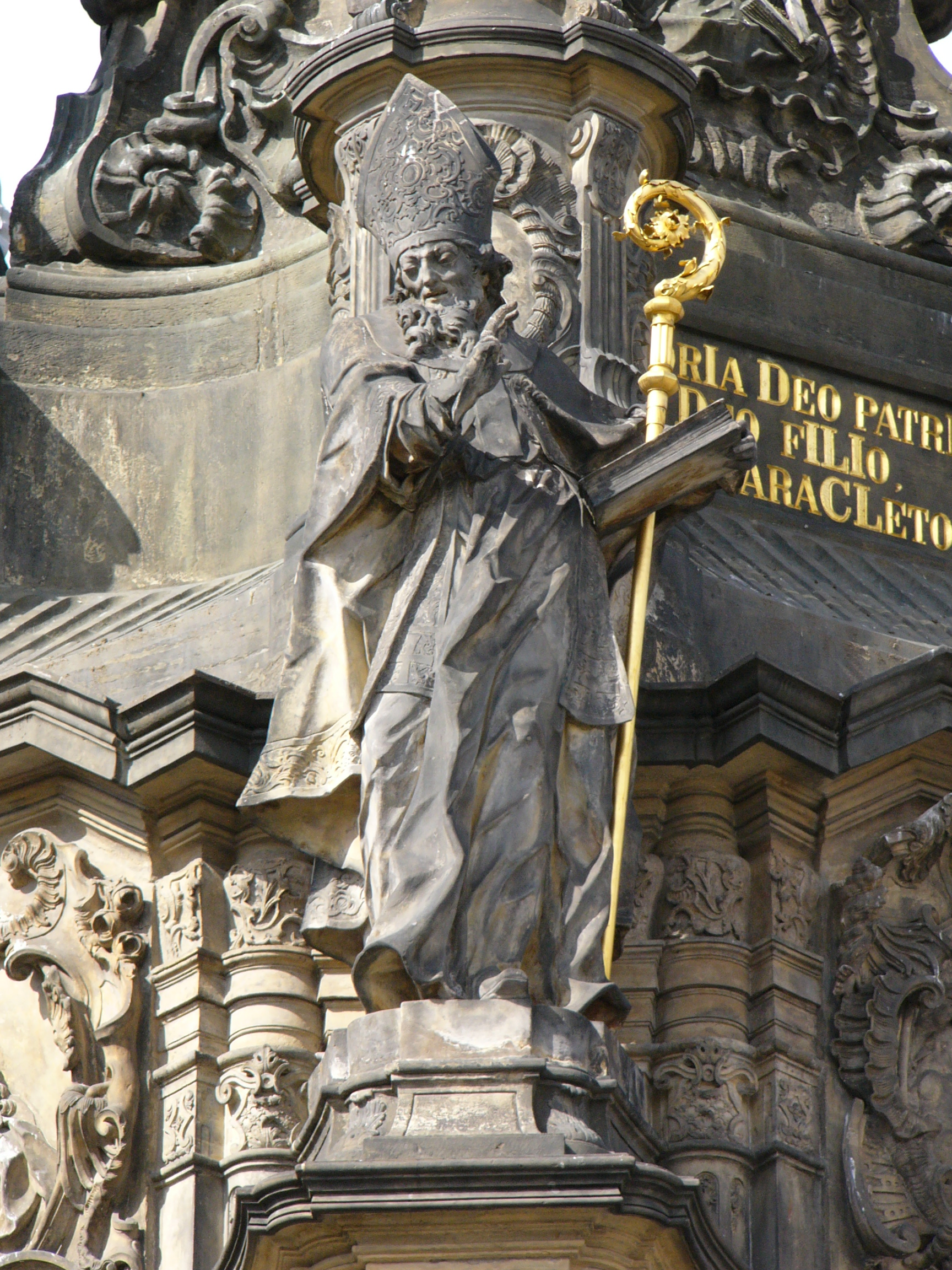
Czech Republic - Statue of Saint Methodius at the Holy Trinity Column in Olomouc in Moravia

Ukraine - The monument in Kyiv

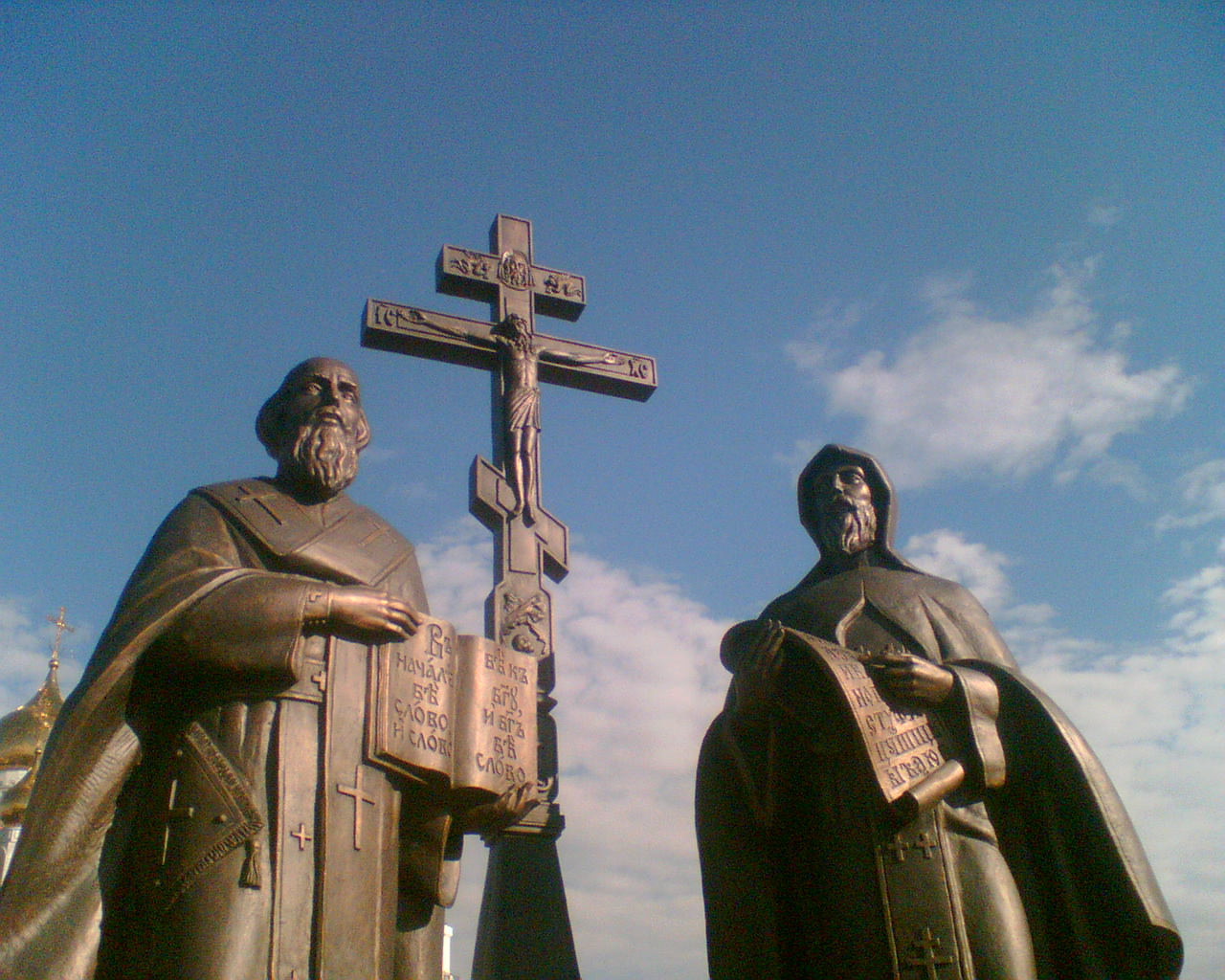
Russia - the monument in Khanty-Mansiysk

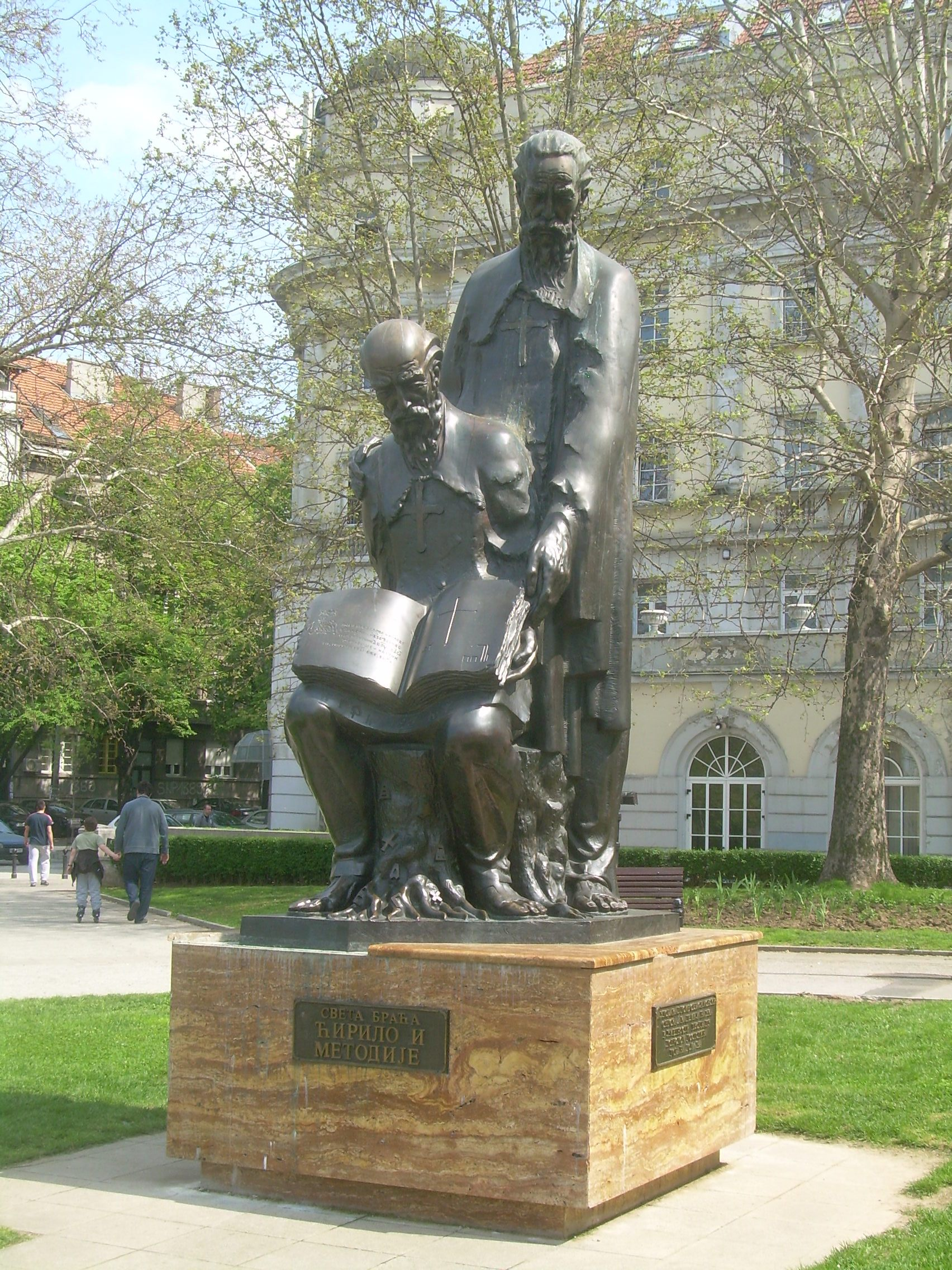
Serbia - the monument to Saints Cyril and Methodius in Belgrade

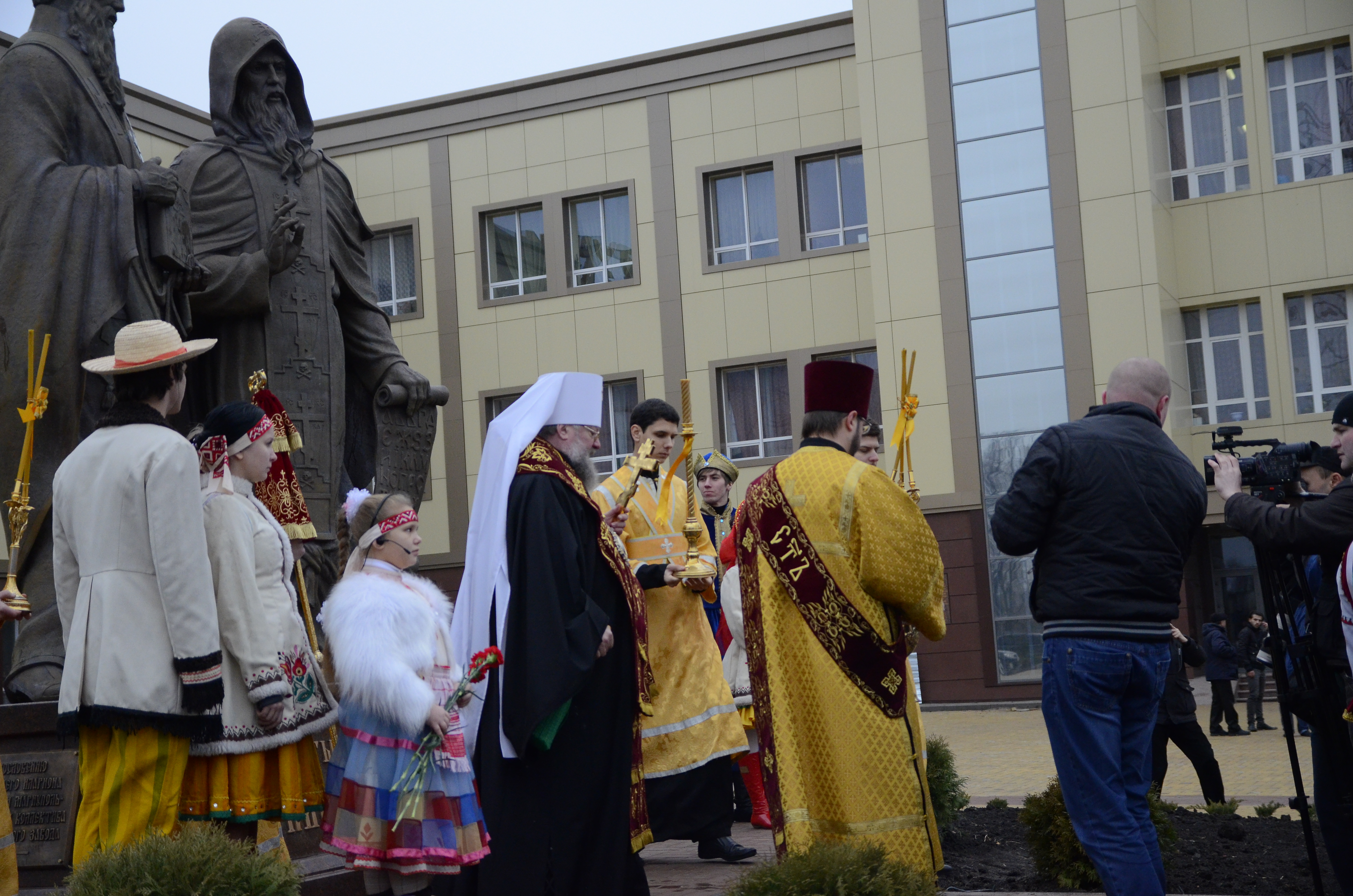
Opening of Cyril and Methodius monument in Donetsk

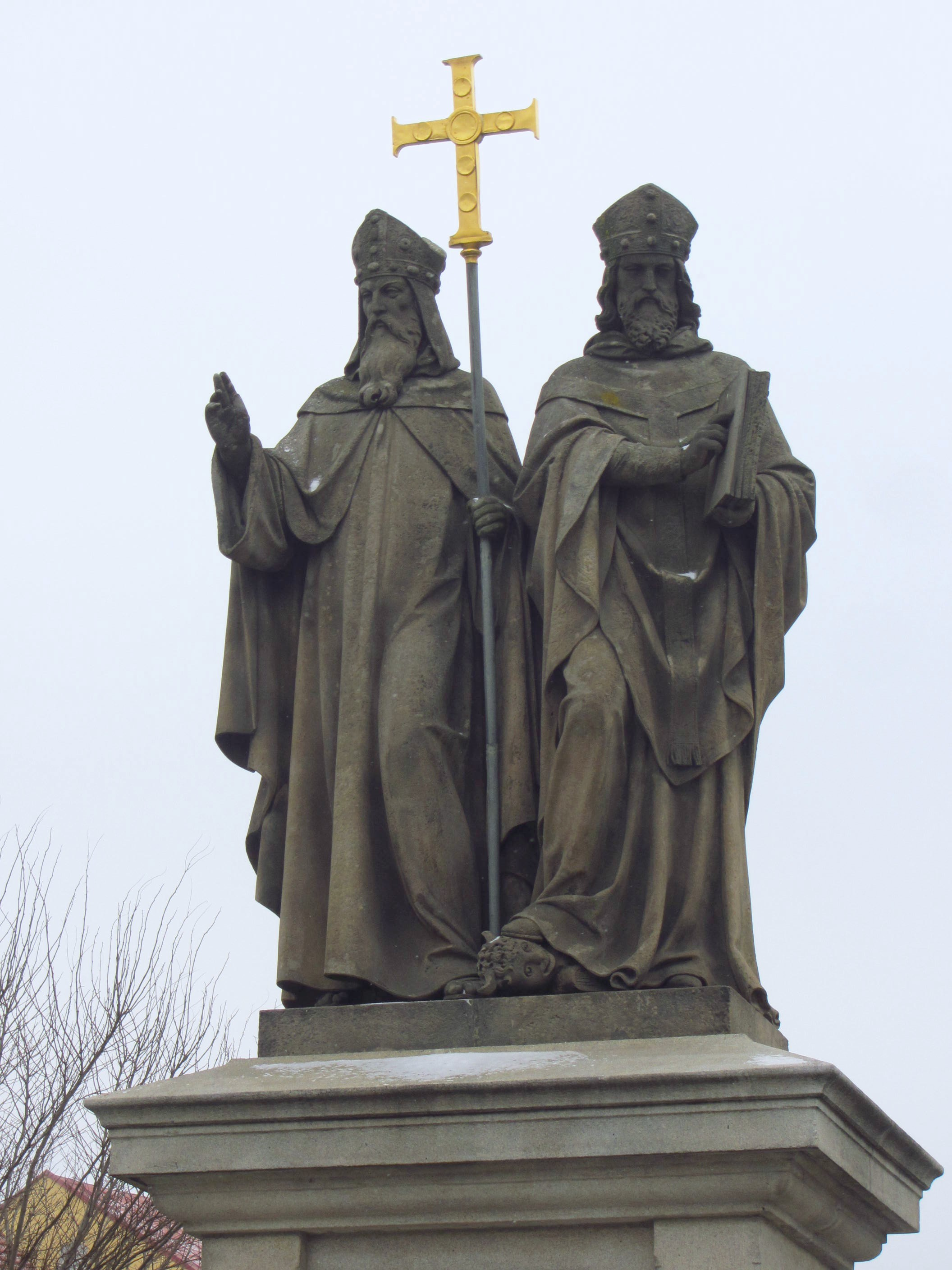
Statue, Saints Cyril and Methodius, Třebíč, Czech Republic

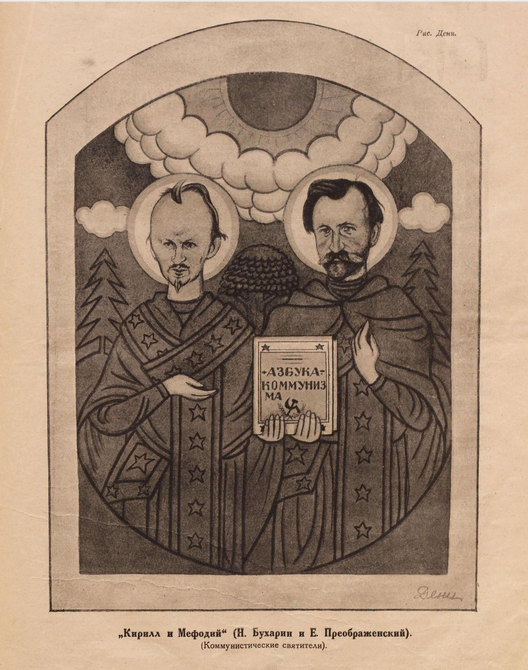
Cartoon by Viktor Deni published in Prozhektor (Searchlight) depicting Nikolai Bukharin and Yevgeni Preobrazhensky as Cyril and Methodius holding The ABC of Communism, 1923

== Names in other relevant languages ==
- Armenian: Կիրիլ և Մեթոդիոս (Kiril ev Metodios)
- Belarusian: Кірыла і Мяфодзій (Kiryła i Miafodzij) or Кірыла і Мятода (Kiryła i Miatoda)
- Bulgarian: Кирил и Методий (Kiril i Metodiy)
- Croatian: Ćiril i Metod
- Czech: Cyril a Metoděj
- Greek: Κύριλλος καὶ Μεθόδιος (Kýrillos kaí Methódios)
- Kazakh: Кирилл және методиус (Kïrïll jäne metodïws)
- Macedonian: Кирил и Методиј (Kiril i Metodij)
- New Church Slavonic: Кѷрі́ллъ и҆ Меѳо́дїй (Kỳrill" i Methodij)
- Old Church Slavonic: Кѷриллъ и Меѳодїи
- Polish: Cyryl i Metody
- Romanian: Chiril și Metodiu
- Russian: Кири́лл и Мефодий (Kirill i Mefodij), pre-1918 spelling: Кириллъ и Меѳодій (Kirill" i Methodij)
- Serbian: Ћирило и Методије / Ćirilo i Metodije
- Slovak: Cyril a Metod
- Slovene: Ciril in Metod
- Ukrainian: Кирило і Мефодій (Kyrylo i Mefodij)

== See also ==
- Cyrillo-Methodian studies
