= Cyrillo-Methodian studies =

Branch of Slavic literary and religious studies

Cyrillo-Methodian studies is a branch of Slavic studies dealing with the life and works of Cyril and Methodius and their disciples.

The first modern studies on Cyril and Methodius date from the late 18th century, with the discipline becoming somewhat classic in the 19th century.

The main research topics of the discipline are the emergence and spread of Glagolitic and Cyrillic. In this connection the questions about their authorship (the life and work of Cyril and Methodius and the so-called five Apostles of the First Bulgarian Empire among their students and all of them canonized as Seven Saints), the exact time and place of creation, the schedule, the authenticity of the artistic sources, the nature of the liturgy during their missions. The historical sources of Cyril and Methodius are mainly Old Bulgarian and Latin.

The historical period on which the excavations are concentrated is the middle of the 9th century - the end of the 12th century / the beginning of the 13th century. During this period, the so-called Old Church Slavonic language or literary Old Bulgarian language was created and approved. In the following period, Croatian Glagolitic, Serbian Cyrillic and Ancient Russian Cyrillic - specific script and literacy were formed respectively, other than Old Bulgarian. The subsequent period in the development of the Bulgarian language is referred to as Middle Bulgarian or Middle Bulgarian language.

In the period 1985-2003 Petar Dinekov published four volumes of the Cyrillo-Methodian Encyclopedia.
