= Statues of Saints Cyril and Methodius, Charles Bridge =

Statues in Prague, Czech Republic

Statues of Saints Cyril and Methodius
- Sousoší svatého Cyrila a Metoděje (Czech)
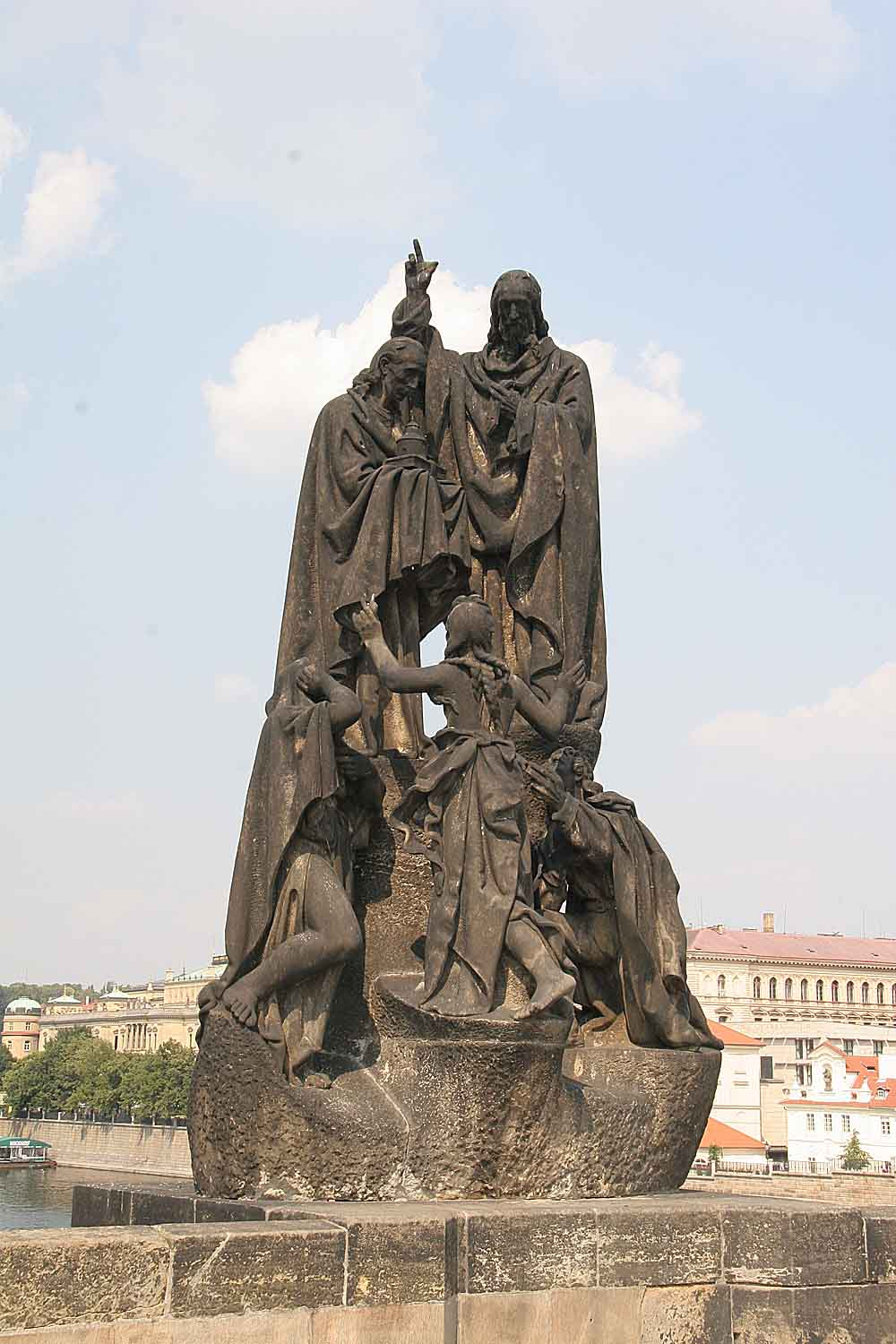
- The statues in 2006
- Location: Prague, Czech Republic; 50°05′12″N 14°24′41″E

Statues of Saints Cyril and Methodius (Czech: Sousoší svatého Cyrila a Metoděje) by Karel Dvořák are installed on the north side of the Charles Bridge in Prague, Czech Republic.
