= Saint Naum =

Slavic writer and missionary

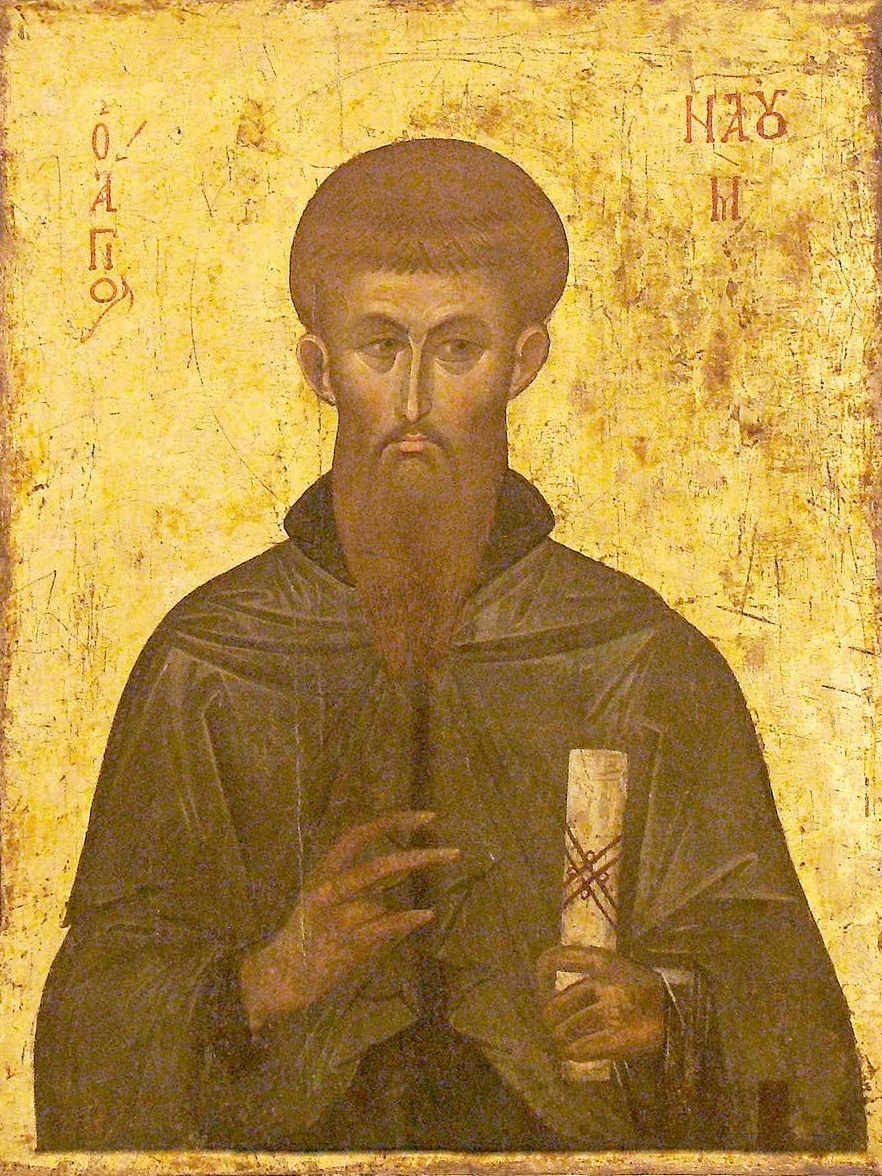
- Icon of Saint Naum

Wonderworker, Apostle of the Slavs
- Born: c. 830; Moesia, First Bulgarian Empire
- Died: December 23, 910; Ohrid, First Bulgarian Empire
- Venerated in: Eastern Orthodox Church; Catholic Church
- Major shrine: Monastery of Saint Naum in Ohrid (Sveti Naum)
- Feast: 5 January and 3 July (Julian calendar), 20 May and 23 December (Revised Julian calendar, Gregorian calendar)

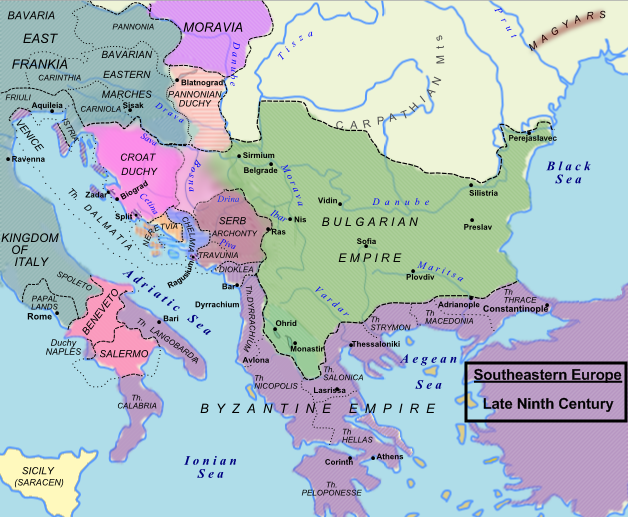
Southeastern Europe in the 9th century.

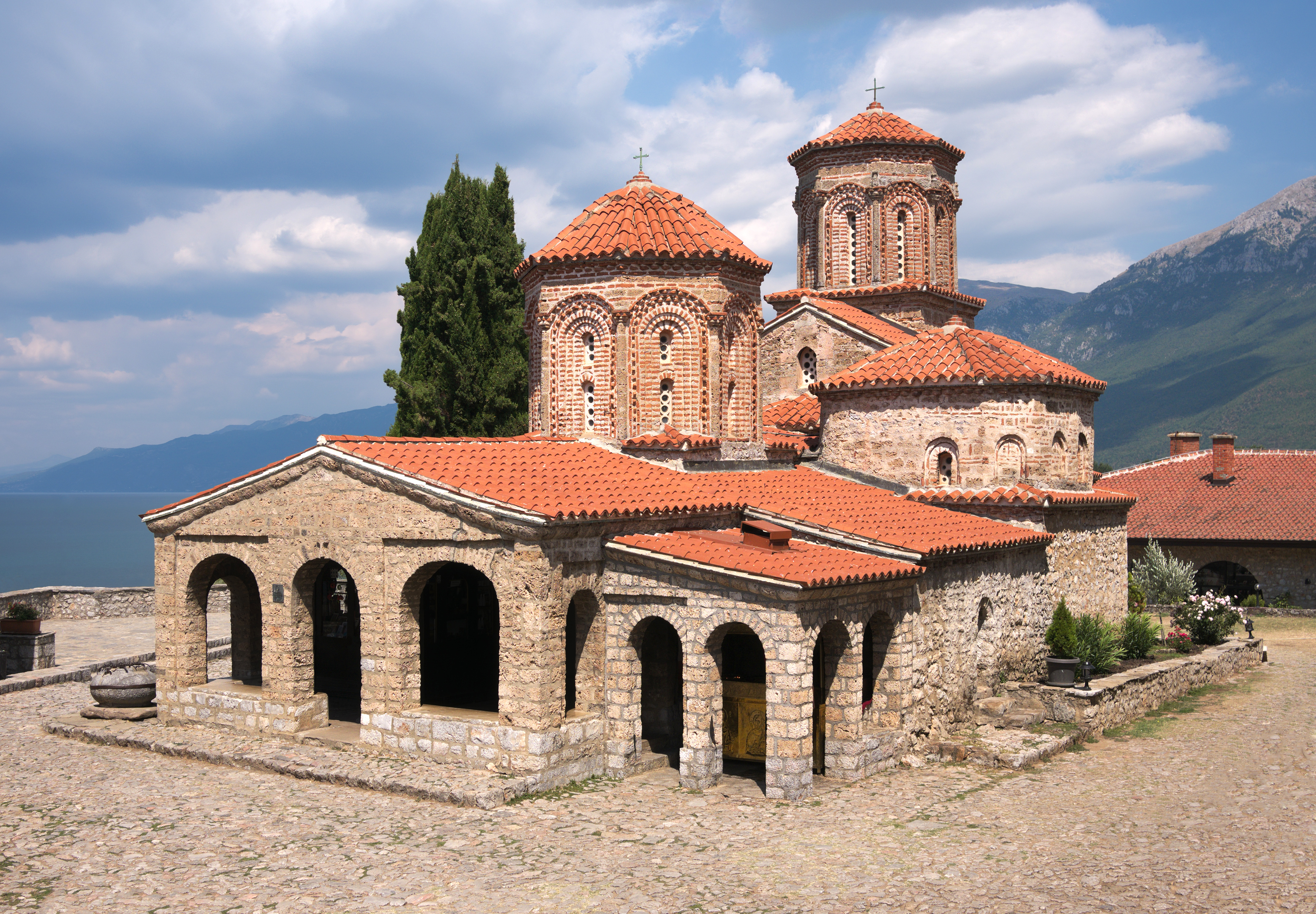
Monastery of Saint Naum, resting place of Naum, located in North Macedonia

Naum (Bulgarian and Macedonian: Свети Наум, romanized: Sveti Naum), also known as Naum of Ohrid or Naum of Preslav (c. 830 – December 23, 910), was a medieval Bulgarian writer and missionary among the Slavs, considered one of the Seven Apostles of the First Bulgarian Empire. He was among the disciples of Cyril and Methodius and is associated with the creation of the Glagolitic and Cyrillic script. Naum was among the founders of the Pliska Literary School. Afterwards Naum worked at the Ohrid Literary School. He was among the first saints declared by the Bulgarian Orthodox Church after its foundation in the 9th century. The mission of Naum played significant role by transformation of the local Early Slavs into Bulgarians.

== Life ==
Information about his early life is scarce. According to the Second Life of Saint Naum, he grew up in Moesia, which was the Byzantine designation for Bulgaria. According to the hagiography of Clement of Ohrid by Theophylact of Ohrid and some other sources, Naum took part in the historic mission to Great Moravia together with Cyril and Methodius, their disciples Gorazd, Clement of Ohrid, Angelar and Sava and other Slavic missionaries in 863.

=== Great Moravia and Lower Panonia ===
For the next 22 years, he worked with Cyril and Methodius and other missionaries in translating the Bible into Old Church Slavonic and promoted it in Great Moravia and Principality of Lower Pannonia. In 867 or 868 he became a priest in Rome, ordained along with two other disciples of Cyril and Methodius, Gorazd and Clement of Ohrid, by bishops Formosus and Gauderic. For the purpose of the mission to Moravia, the missionaries devised the Glagolitic alphabet, the first alphabet to match the specific features of the Slavic language. Its descendant script, Cyrillic, is still used by many languages today. The missionaries also wrote the first Slavic Civil Code, which was used in Great Moravia. However, the missionary work ran into opposition from German clerics who opposed their efforts to create a Slavic liturgy. By 885, the two main patrons for the missionaries, Rastislav of Moravia of Great Moravia and Prince Koceľ of Lower Pannonia, as well as Cyril and Methodius had died, and the pressure from the German Church became increasingly more hostile. After a brief period of imprisonment due to the ongoing conflict with the German clerics, Naum, together with some of the missionaries (including Clement of Ohrid and Angelar) headed to Bulgaria.

=== First Bulgarian Empire ===
In 886 the governor of Belgrade, then in Bulgaria, welcomed the disciples of Cyril and Methodius. Bulgaria was ruled then by Knyaz Boris, who converted to Christianity in 864. After the christianization the religious ceremonies were conducted in Greek by a Byzantine clergy. Fearing growing Byzantine influence Boris viewed the adoption of the Old Church Slavonic as a way to preserve the political independence of Bulgaria. With such views, Boris made arrangements for the establishment of two literary academies where theology was to be taught in the Slavonic language. The first of the schools was founded in the capital, Pliska, and the second school in Ohrid, in the region of Kutmichevitsa. The development of Old Church Slavonic literacy had the effect of preventing the assimilation into the neighboring cultures and promoted the formation of a distinct Bulgarian identity.

Naum moved initially to the capital Pliska together with Clement, Angelar and possibly Gorazd (according to other sources, Gorazd was already dead by that time). In Bulgaria, he spent the next 25 years of his life. Naum was one of the founders of the Pliska Literary School where he worked between 886 and 893. In 893, shortly after his rise to power, the new Bulgarian ruler Simeon the Great, summoned an ecclesiastical council in the new capital Preslav, where Clement was ordained bishop of Drembica and Velika. To replace Clement in Ohrid, Simeon sent Naum, who until then had been active in Preslav. Afterwards, Naum continued Clement's work at Ohrid, another important centre of Slavic learning. In these years the Cyrillic script was created in the Preslav literary school, and was adopted in Bulgaria, possibly following Naum's initiative. In 905 Naum founded a monastery on the shores of Lake Ohrid, which later received his name. He died there in 910 and Clement initiated the process of his canonization. In this way Naum became the first "native" saint of Bulgaria.

=== Legacy ===
The cults towards him are revered particularly in the region of Ohrid. It spread in the first half of the 18th century with the development of Moscopole as a center of Orthodox culture and with the development of the Archbishopric of Ohrid. His name became more popular and reached Mount Athos and even Vienna. The members of the Bektashi order also went on pilgrimage to the monastery of Saint Naum, believing their saint Sarı Saltık to be buried in it. Saint Naum's original feast day was December 23, but in 1727 on the authority of the Archbishop of Ohrid, it was changed to June 20.

St. Naum Peak on Livingston Island in the South Shetland Islands, Antarctica, is named after him.
