= Pope Stephen V =

Head of the Catholic Church from 885 to 891

- Bishop of Rome
- Church: Catholic Church
- Papacy began: September 885
- Papacy ended: 14 September 891
- Predecessor: Adrian III
- Successor: Formosus

Personal details
- Born: Rome, Papal States
- Died: 14 September 891 Rome, Papal States

Pope Stephen V (Latin: Stephanus V; died 14 September 891) was the bishop of Rome and leader of the Papal States from September 885 to his death on 14 September 891. In his dealings with Photius I of Constantinople, as in his relations with the young Slavic Orthodox church, he pursued the policy of Pope Nicholas I.

== Early life ==
His father Hadrian, who belonged to the Roman aristocracy, entrusted his education to his relative, Bishop Zachary, librarian of the Holy See. Stephen was created cardinal-priest of Santi Quattro Coronati by Marinus I.

== Pontificate ==
Stephen V was elected to succeed Adrian III on the account of his holiness on 17 May 885, but was not accepted by the Holy Roman Emperor Charles III the Fat. However, he was consecrated in September 885 without waiting for the imperial confirmation. The emperor sent a legate to overthrow him, but when he found with what unanimity he had been elected, he let the matter rest.

Stephen was called upon to face a famine caused by a drought and by locusts, and as the papal treasury was empty he had to fall back on his father's wealth to relieve the poor, to redeem captives, and to repair churches.

In 885, Moravian archbishop Methodius of Thessaloniki was succeeded by his disciple, Gorazd, but due to the influence of the German clergy, led by bishop Wiching, pope Stephen forbade the use of the Slavic language in liturgy and sacraments, thus restricting its use only to sermons for the common people. Most of the Slavs then fell under the jurisdiction of the Patriarchate of Constantinople.

To promote order, he adopted Guy III of Spoleto "as his son" and crowned him emperor in 891. He also recognized Louis the Blind as king of Provence. Since Archbishop Aurelian would not consecrate Teutbold, who had been canonically elected bishop of Langres, Stephen himself consecrated him. He had also opposed the arbitrary proceedings of the archbishops of Bordeaux and Ravenna, and resisted the attacks which Patriarch Photius I of Constantinople made on the Holy See. His resistance was successful, and Emperor Leo VI sent Photius into exile. When writing against Photius, Stephen begged the emperor to send warships and soldiers to enable him to ward off the assaults of the Saracens on papal territory, and southern Italy and from 885 to 886 the Byzantines reoccupied southern Italy from the Muslims.

In 887/8, Stephen wrote that Christian slaves of Muslims, who were mutilated by their captors, could become priests. He also excused them if they murdered during their captivity.

Stephen, who received many English pilgrims and envoys bringing Peterspence, was buried in the portico of Saint Peter's Basilica.

== Sources ==
- Duthilleul, Pierre (1935). "Les sources de l'histoire des saints Cyrille et Méthode". Échos d'Orient. 34 (179): 272–306.
- Duthilleul, Pierre (1963). L'évangélisation des slaves: Cyrille et Méthode. Tournai: Desclée.
- 9th edition (1880s) of the Encyclopædia Britannica
- Catholic Encyclopedia: Pope Stephen (V) VI

Catholic Church titles
Preceded by Adrian III	Pope; 885–891	Succeeded by Formosus
