= Wiching =

First Bishop of Nitra from 880 to 891

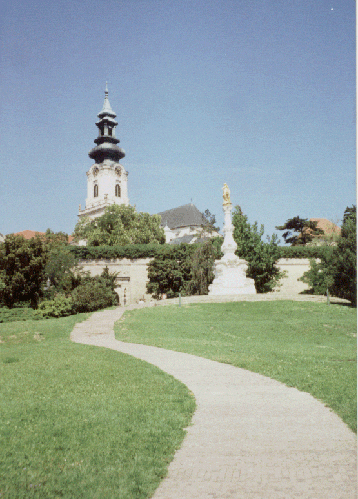
Nitra, Cathedral

Wiching or Viching (d. c. 900/912) was an East Frankish prelate from Alamannia, who was a Benedictine monk, and served since 880 as the first Bishop of Nitra, in what was then the Great Moravia.

== Life ==
He served between 880 and 891 AD. Wiching was originally a Benedictine monk from Alamannia (Swabia). After 874, he served Svatopluk I. From 874 to 879 he worked with John of Venice. At the end of 879 he was appointed a bishop of Great Moravia, after St Methodius, and in 880 visited the Pope in Rome, who made him Bishop of Nitra. He was known for accusing the Saints Cyril and Methodius of heresy for holding Divine Liturgy in Old Church Slavonic instead of the standard Latin of the Roman Church.

Wiching was a counselor for Svatopluk I and the only known suffragan of Archbishop Methodius. Wiching was notorious for his disputes with St. Methodius. He remained in Rome and sent to king Svatopluk an allegedly forged letter from the pope, which caused Svatopluk to unseat Methodius. In 881, Methodius learned from the Pope about the forgery and appealed to the Pope, who deposed Wiching.

In 885, shortly before Methodius' death, Wiching left Poland and with the consent of Svatopluk went to Rome, where he falsely accused Methodius to the new Pope, Stephen V, who issued papal bull Quia te zelo fidei, forbidding the use of the Slavic language in liturgy and sacraments, thus restricting its use only to sermons for the common people.

During the summer of 885, when the Pope learned of the death of Methodius, he named Wiching once again as bishop of Nitra and, in addition, gave him the title of Ecclesiastical Administrator. Wiching used this position to expel Methodius' students. In 891/892, he left Svatopluk to serve Arnulf of Carinthia with whom Svatopluk was having a conflict. Wiching was part of the delegation sent to Svatopluk to negotiate peace. After Arnulf of Carinthia died, and with the fall of Great Moravia, Wiching withdrew from public life. He died between 900 and 912, likely on September 12.

== Sources ==
- Bartl, Július; Čičaj, Viliam; Kohútova, Mária; Letz, Róbert; Segeš, Vladimír; Škvarna, Dušan (2002). Slovak History: Chronology & Lexicon. Bolchazy-Carducci Publishers, Slovenské Pedegogické Nakladatel'stvo. ISBN 0-86516-444-4.
- Bowlus, Charles R. (1995). Franks, Moravians, and Magyars: The Struggle for the Middle Danube, 788–907. Philadelphia: University of Pennsylvania Press.
- Duthilleul, Pierre (1935). "Les sources de l'histoire des saints Cyrille et Méthode". Échos d'Orient. 34 (179): 272–306.
- Duthilleul, Pierre (1963). L'évangélisation des slaves: Cyrille et Méthode. Tournai: Desclée.
- Dvornik, Francis (1964). "The Significance of the Missions of Cyril and Methodius". Slavic Review. 23 (2): 195–211.
- Vlasto, Alexis P. (1970). The Entry of the Slavs into Christendom: An Introduction to the Medieval History of the Slavs. Cambridge: Cambridge University Press.
