= County of Steinamanger =

The County of Steinamanger (also known as County of Savaria or County of Sabaria) was a county of the March of Pannonia in the Carolingian empire and was part of the Frankish-Bavarian area of upper Pannonia, together with the considerably larger Donaugrafschaft. It existed from approximately 825 to 907. Afterwards the area was conquered by the invading Magyars. It was centered around the modern city of Szombathely in Hungary.

== Area ==
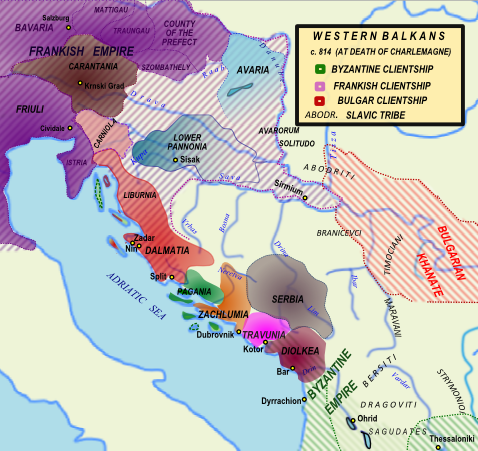
The area of the County of Steinamanger (Szombathely) around 814

The County of Steinamanger and the Donaugrafschaft are the first two documented “territorial counties” of the Bavarian East, which were not merely mandated territories, but already territorially defined administrative units. The ancient Roman city of Savaria is often assumed to be the predecessor of the eponymous Steinamanger. However, the reconstructed castle there cannot yet be proven historically or archaeologically. The approximate borders of the county lay along the rivers Zöbernbach, Güns, Raab/Rabnitzbach, Pinka, and Lafnitz. Neighboring territories were the Slavic Principality in Lower Pannonia to the south and southeast, the Principality of Carantania to the west, and the Donaugrafschaft to the north. The Zöbernbach stream, which was mentioned before the mid-9th century as "rivolus qui vocatur Seuria", takes its name from Savaria. The name of the Lower Austrian village of Zöbern is derived from the stream.

== Origin ==
The county's territory belonged to the Avar Khaganate until the end of the 8th century. Around 800, Charlemagne conquered the Avars and subsequently incorporated the area around Savaria into the Frankish Empire. Between 805 and 828, the Avar Khaganate, now tributary to the Franks, existed between Carnuntum and Savaria, forming a buffer zone between the Frankish Empire and the First Bulgarian Empire. Since the Avar princes were apparently no longer up to this military task, the Bavarian Count Rihheri was probably entrusted with the administration of the territory around Savaria in the south of the Khaganate before 825, thus transforming it into a county modeled on the Frankish system. The Avar Khaganate was finally dissolved in 828.

The first documented mention of the county dates from 844.

== Politics ==
The county was subordinate to the Prefect of the East, appointed by the king. The first count was Rihheri, appointed during the reign of Emperor Louis the Pious. In 856, after the overthrow of the magnate Ratpot, the role of Eastern Prefect passed directly to the Carolingian royal house in the person of Prince Carloman. Carloman appointed the brothers William II and Engelschalk I as overseers of the county. They were members of the Wilhelminers family, just like Rihheri.

In the course of the soon-to-begin jurisdictional disputes between King Louis the German and his son Carloman, the royalist Rihheri was replaced in 860 by Odalrich, a follower of the prince. Odalrich had been established in the Bavarian leadership elite for some time and was already present in 848 in the royal city of Regensburg among the highest lords of Bavaria at the donation of his previous fiefs to Pribina, the prince of the neighboring Pannonian principality.

The king responded to his son's power claims by granting extensive lands within the son's mandate to the Bavarian Church. Among these were 20 mansi in the village of Savariae vadum in Odalrich's county, which were bequeathed to Stift Mattsee as an allod in May 860. On November 20 of the same year, through an "exceedingly generous" royal donation of goods throughout the eastern part of the county, in addition to other churches and towns in the county, such as Prostrum and presumably Pinkafeld, even the seat of the Count, including the town of Savaria (Steinamanger), passed into the ownership of the Archbishop of Salzburg. The gifting deed contains the noteworthy information – due to Odalrich's short reign – that the donated goods originated from the hereditary property of the dynast Odalrich and other loyal followers of the king. Count Odalrich, in his capacity as royal messenger, had the task of instructing the bishop in his new possession.

In 869 Odalrich led his army contingent in a battle near Baden fighting alongside Prince Carloman against the Moravians under their prince Svatopluk. After the death of the Wilhelmine brothers in the fight against the Moravians in 871, the king once again disregarded his son Carloman and entrusted the administration of Upper Pannonia to Margrave Aribo I, who was assisted in Steinamanger by a Count Ernst, the last known ruler of the county, who succeeded Odalrich. However, further successors as Counts of Steinamanger cannot be ruled out.

== Ecclesiastical history ==
The ecclesiastical history of the Bavarian East was dominated by the Christianization of the formerly pagan Avar territories. Before 830 a presbyter was likely the highest-ranking church representative in the county. Around 830, during the reign of Prefect Gerold (II), King Louis the German assigned the County of Steinamanger to the Archdiocese of Salzburg. The first known ecclesiastical leader here was the priest Dominicus, who received lands in Brunnaron for colonization from King Louis the German on September 15, 844. After Dominicus' death, a deacon was presumably appointed. The donation of November 860 to the Bishop of Salzburg significantly strengthened the bishop's position and influence in the county.

The first churches in the county were built especially during the period between 850 and 879. They were most likely those built in Pilgersdorf, Pinkafeld, Meszlen, Kukmirn, Prostrum, St. Rupprecht, Ussitin, Businiza, Savaria, Ablanza and possibly St. Veit.

== Dissolution ==
At the beginning of the 10th century, there were serious clashes between the Bavarian East and the Magyars. As early as 894, the Magyars had ravaged "all of Pannonia". The extent to which the County of Steinamanger was affected is unknown, as is the question of whether troops from the county were part of the Bavarian army when the Bavarians were decisively defeated at the Battle of Pressburg on July 4, 907. The overlord of Steinamanger, Margrave Aribo, most likely did not participate in this battle.

At the latest after the Battle of Pressburg, the Magyars took power in the county, dissolved the Frankish leadership structure and replaced it with their own administration. Even after the Battle of Lechfeld in 955, when the Magyars were forced to withdraw from parts of the eastern part of Hungary, the Lafnitz River remained a border river between Hungary and the newly formed Holy Roman Empire. The territory of the former county was now located in the "border wasteland" of the Hungarian defensive system called Gyepű and subsequently shared its history with western Hungary and the later Burgenland.
