= Aribonids =

Bavarian noble family

The Aribonids were a noble family of probably Bavarian origin who rose to preeminence in the Carolingian March of Pannonia and the later Margraviate of Austria (marcha orientalis) in the late ninth and early tenth centuries. The dynasty is named after its ancestor Margrave Aribo of Austria (d. 909). The Aribonids maintained influence in the Duchy of Bavaria, the Austrian march, and other parts of Germany (the Saxon eastern marches and the Rhineland) until the early twelfth century, when they disappear.

== Genealogy ==
Their earliest identifiable member was Bishop Arbeo of Freising (d. 784), probably related to the Huosi family. Margrave Aribo succeeded William and his brother Engelschalk I in the Bavarian March of Pannonia in 871, after both had been killed fighting against Great Moravian forces. In result, the Aribonid dynasty had a long-sustained feud with the Wilhelminers in the late ninth century. As in the Wilhelminer War the dukes of Great Moravia tended to support the Wilhelminer Engelschalk II, the Aribonids were usually at war with the Moravians. Margrave Aribo survived the disastrous Battle of Pressburg in 907 and became the dynasty's progenitor.

As most of the Pannonian march had been conquered by the Magyars, the family retired to Bavaria. The Aribonids controlled the Archdiocese of Salzburg for a long time. From 985 the dynasty held the office of a Bavarian count palatine and donated monasteries like Seeon Abbey and Göss Abbey in Styria. They lost their influence after they got involved in a 1055 insurrection led by Duke Conrad I of Bavaria against Emperor Henry III. Nevertheless, they retained some of their possessions in Carinthia, where they later established the abbeys of Millstatt and Eberndorf. In fact, the family provided many high ecclesiastics; Bishop Pilgrim of Passau (971–991) as well as the archbishops Aribo of Mainz (1021–1031) and his brother Pilgrim of Cologne (1021–1036) were Aribonids, as their names would suggest.
