= Aribo =

Aribo can refer to:

- Joe Aribo, footballer
- Arbeo of Freising (723–784), bishop of Freising, author
- Aribo of Austria (c. 850–909), margrave of the March of Pannonia
- Aribo of Leoben (fl. 904), count of Leobental
- Aribo I of Bavaria (d. 1001/1020), Count Palatine of Bavaria
- Aribo (Archbishop of Mainz) (d. 1031)
- Aribo II of Bavaria (1024–1102), Count Palatine of Bavaria
- Aribo Scholasticus, Benedictine monk and music theorist of the 11th century

== See also ==
- Aribonids, noble family named after Aribo of Austria
