= Raffelstetten customs regulations =

Latin-language medieval legal text about trade between Germans and Slavs

Raffelstetten customs regulations (Latin: Inquisitio de theloneis Raffelstettensis, literally: "Inquiry of the Raffelstetten Tolls") is a rare example of a legal regulation of customs in Early Medieval Europe, the text of which has been preserved until modern times. The regulation is only known from a single copy, a manuscript dated to the 1250s, which was preserved in a church at Passau. The critical edition of the manuscript was published in the Monumenta Germaniae Historica in 1897 by Alfred Boretius and Victor Krause. The incipit reads: "Noverit omnium fidelium orthodoxorum...".

== Contents and examination ==
=== Overview ===
The text has been given the scholarly name Inquisitio de theloneis Raffelstettensis after Raffelstetten (called Raffoltestetun in the text), a toll-bar on the Danube, a few kilometres downstream (southeast) from Linz (nowadays part of the town of Asten in Upper Austria). The regulation has been dated to somewhere 903 and 905/906. At the time, Raffelstetten was part of East Francia, under the nominal reign of the Carolingian king Louis the Child (r. 900–911), who was about 9 years old when the incident occurred. The background of the regulation was that Bavarian bishops, abbots and counts, "whose path led them to eastern territories" (qui in orientales partes iter habebant), had complained (clamor) to the child-king about being "disturbed by unauthorised customs duties and tolls" (se iniusto theloneo et iniqua muta constrictos in illis partibus et coartatos). Therefore, a royal order was issued to the Margrave of the Bavarian Ostmark Aribo (r. 871–909), together with "judges from the eastern territories" (iudicibus orientalium), to investigate and redefine the existing, traditional customs law. Then, a total of 41 named secular and church officials including bishops and counts reviewed the investigation, and the Inquisitio de theloneis Raffelstettensis summarises the results of their findings.

=== Identification of toponyms ===
"Ships from the western regions, however, which have left the Passau Forest and want to land at Rosdorf or wherever and hold market, pay half a drachma as duty, that is one scoti. If they want to travel further downstream to Linz, they pay three half measures from each ship, i.e. three bushels of salt. For slaves (mancipiis) and all other goods, however, they give nothing, but after that they shall have permission to land and trade wherever they wish as far as the Bohemian Forest.(...)"

— fragment from the Raffelstetten customs regulations

Several toponyms and demonyms are mentioned in the text. Scholars have been able to identify most of them to modern-day locations, but there are some unresolved questions.

- Bawari[a]. "Bavaria".
- Patavi[a]; silva Patavica. "Passau"; "Passau woods" (German: Passauer Wald, nowadays Sauwald).
- Arboni marchioni. "of Arbo the margrave." Indirectly refers to the March of Pannonia or Eastern March, governed by margrave Aribo or Arbo (r. 871–909).
- Raffoltestetun. "Raffelstetten."
- Rosdorf. Nowadays named Aschach an der Donau.
- ad Lintzam. "to Linz".
- ad silvam Boemicam. "to the Bohemian Forest".
- Anesim fluvium. "the river Enns".
- ad Urulam. "to the Url (river)."
- Trungowe. "Traungau", a pagus of the Duchy of Bavaria that later became part of Upper Austria.
- Sclavi. "Slavs" (modern German: Slawen; modern Czech: Slované). To be distinguished from enslaved people (modern German: Sklaven), who are identified as mancipia, see res mancipi.
- de Rugis. Uncertain; it could refer to the Rugii (see Rugiland), or to the Rus'.
- iuxta ripam Danubii. "on the banks of the Danube" (German: Donau).
- in Rotalariis vel in Reodariis. "at the [people] of Rodel or those of Ried".
- Eperaespurch. Understood to render Ebersburg in modern German, although its location is unknown. Boretius & Krause (1897) argued it was a "vicus at the present site of Mautern (an der Donau)."
- ad Mutarun. "to Mautern (an der Donau)".
- ad mercatum Marahorum. "to the market of the Moravians".

=== Assessment ===
The customs regulations are very valuable for scholarly research on trade in Eastern Europe in the 9th and 10th centuries. As the 41 officials claimed to list the customs places and rates that were supposedly in force during the reigns of Louis the German (r. 843–876) and Carloman of Bavaria (r. 876–879), some inferences can be made about the period between the 840s and 906, although extrapolating beyond 906 is much riskier. The text makes it clear that Raffelstetten was a place where various traders met between the mid-9th century and the beginning of the 10th.

The regulation mentions "skoti", a currency otherwise not attested in Carolingian Europe. It appears that both the name and weight of the "skoti" were borrowed from Rus' people. (Note: The Old East Slavic word "skotъ" derives from Old Norse *skattr; the whole monetary system is based on African dirham.)

== Bibliography ==
=== Primary sources ===
- Boretius, Alfred; Krause, Victor, eds. (1897). "Capitularia regum Francorum II: 253: Inquisito de theloneis Raffelstettensis". MGH Capit. 2: Leges. Monumenta Germaniae Historica (MGH) (in Latin). Hanover: Hahn. pp. 249–252.

=== Literature ===
- George Duby, The Early Growth of the European Economy (1973) pp. 131–2 of English edition
- Renée Doehaerd, Le Haut Moyen Âge occidental : économies et sociétés, 3e éd. 1990, Paris, PUF, 1971, pp. 257–8 and p. 289 (coll. Nouvelle Clio).
- König, Daniel G. (2022). "903–906: Die Raffelstettener Zollordnung und der Export slawischer Sklaven in die islamische Sphäre" [903–906: The Raffelstetten Customs Regulation and the Export of Slavic Slaves to the Islamic Sphere]. Transmediterrane Geschichte (in German). 4 (1): 17. doi:10.18148/TMH/2022.4.1.54.
- Nazarenko, A. V. (2001). Древна Русија на међународним путевима [Ancient Russia on International Roads]. Interdisciplinary Studies on Cultural, Trade, and Political Relations (in Serbian). Moscow: Языки русской культуры. pp. 71–112.
