= Arbeo of Freising =

Bishop of the Diocese of Freising from 764 to 784)

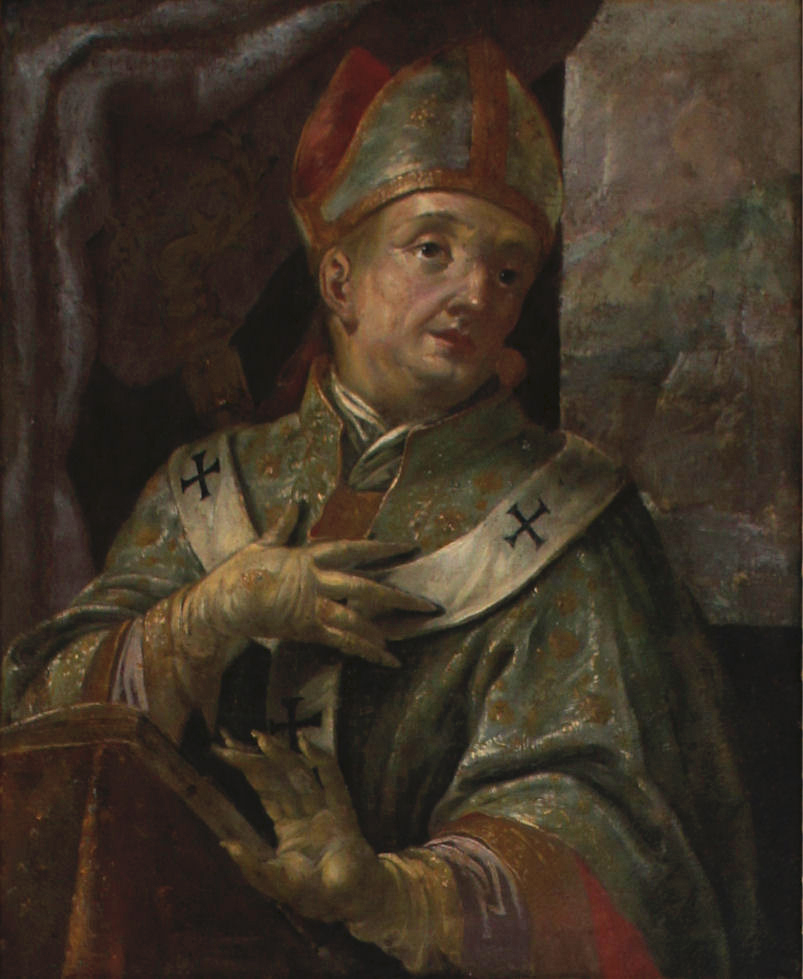
- Born: 723; Meran
- Died: 784 (aged 60–61)
- Occupations: Author and Bishop of Freising
- Writing career
- Pen name: Aribo

Saint Arbeo of Freising (also Aribo, Arbo, or Arpeo, in Latin Heres, a direct translation of Arbeo) (723 AD or earlier near Meran – 4 May 784) was an early medieval author and the Bishop of Freising from 764.

Arbeo is thought to have been a scion of the Huosi noble dynasty in the stem duchy of Bavaria. He may have been the child which, according to his own hagiography, Saint Corbinian rescued from the floodwaters of the Passer river near Meran. Arbeo was raised by Corbinians's brother Erembert and prepared for an ecclesiastical career, becoming a member of the Benedictine Order. At first a priest and notary under Bishop Joseph of Freising and official of the episcopal chancery, he was appointed abbot of the newly founded monastery of Scharnitz in 763. One year later he succeeded Joseph as Bishop of Freising.

During his tenure, the Bavarian monasteries of Innichen, Schäftlarn and Schliersee were established, and Scharnitz Abbey relocated to Schlehdorf. Arbeo had the relics of Saint Corbinian transferred to Freising. In the long-time quarrels of the Agilolfing duke Tassilo III of Bavaria with his Frankish suzerains, the bishop remained a loyal supporter of King Charlemagne and may have lost his diocese in his later years.

Arbeo founded the Freising episcopal library and scriptorium. He is often counted as the first named author in German and is sometimes credited with the composition of the Codex Abrogans, a bilingual vocabulary in Latin and Old High German, often described as the first German book.

He is buried in Freising. He is venerated as a saint in the Roman Catholic Church on the 4th of May, and the Eastern Orthodox Church on an unknown day. An affiliation with Margrave Aribo, progenitor of the Aribonids is possible but has not been established.

== Works ==
- Arbeonis episcopi Frisingensis vitae sanctorum Haimhrammi et Corbiniani ("Lives of Saints Emmeram and Corbinian, by Arbeo, Bishop of Freising")
- Albert Lehner: Sacerdos = Bischof. Klerikale hiérarchie in der Emmeramsvita, 2007 Leipzig (Leipziger Universitätsverlag / ISBN 978-3-86583-183-5).
- Sigmund Ritter von Riezler: Arbeo, Allgemeine Deutsche Biographie (ADB), Vol. 1, Duncker & Humblot, Leipzig 1875, p. 510.
- Friedrich Wilhelm Bautz: Arbeo (Aribo, Arbo), Bischof von Freising, Biographisch-Bibliographisches Kirchenlexikon (BBKL), Vol. 1, Hamm 1975, Sp. 205.
