= Dominicus (missionary in Pannonia) =

Dominicus (9th-century) was a cleric, notary to king Louis the German and the first Christian missionary known by name in the East Frankish principality of Moosburg, active at Pribina's court. His origins are unclear, but he was probably from East Francia. Because of the church he built in what is now Pilgersdorf, the locality is considered the oldest documented municipality in Burgenland.

== Notary at the court of Louis the German ==
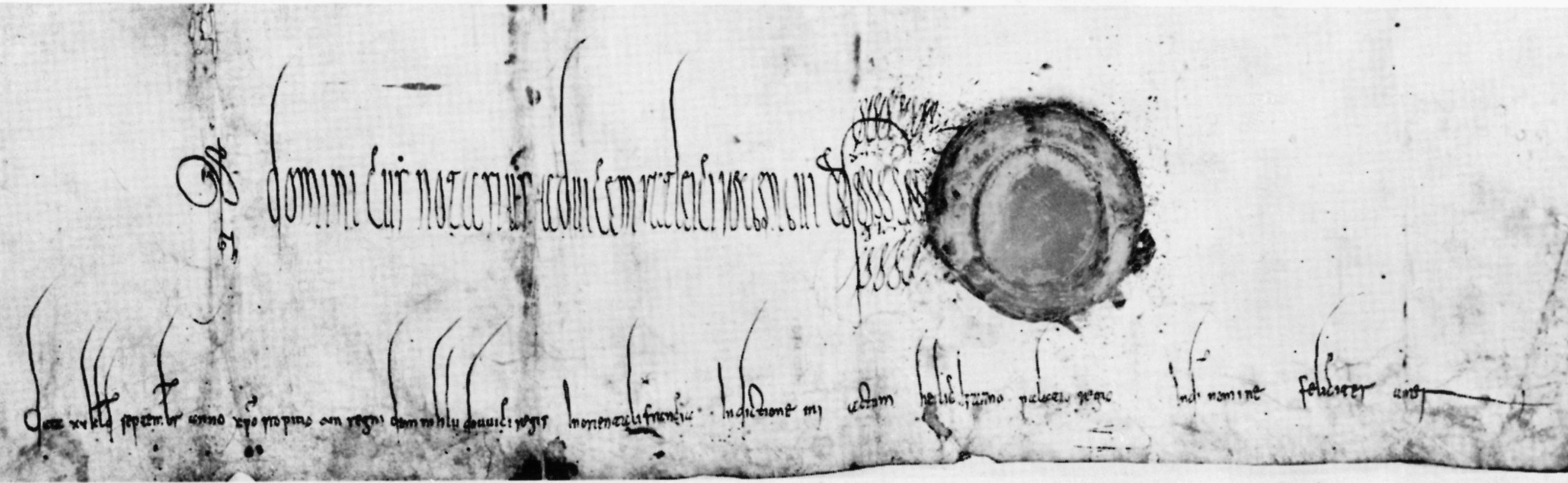
Charter of the notary Dominicus (dominicus notarius), dated August 18, 841.

In 837 Dominicus was a scribe to Archbishop Baturich of Regensburg, the archchaplain of Louis the German. After the death of the Frankish king Louis the Pious, the royal chancery was reorganized. Abbot Ratleik of Seligenstadt became the new chief chancellor and likely brought Dominicus with him into the chancery. In a charter dated December 10th, 840 Dominicus is documented for the first time as notary to the Bavarian king Louis the German. The characteristics of his handwriting identify him—at least indirectly—as a member of the scriptorium of the Abbey of Saint-Martin de Tours.

== Missionary in the principality of Moosburg ==
From around 844 Dominicus served as a priest at the court of Prince Pribina of Moosburg, where he was initially subject to Pribina under proprietary church law. The Christian mission in the region was under the jurisdiction of the Archdiocese of Salzburg. In 836 the Salzburg bishop Liupram appointed the chorepiscopus Osbald to oversee missionary activities in the regions of Carantania and Pannonia. Osbald was most likely also active at Moosburg, for example as the builder of the Church of St. John in Moosburg. Dominicus was formally subordinate to Osbald in missionary matters, however he came from the Diocese of Regensburg. This led to a dispute between Pribina and Bishop Liupram of Salzburg, which lasted until 850. In that year Pribina and the archbishop concluded an agreement in which Liupram granted Dominicus permission to celebrate Mass, thereby recognizing his previous activities. For this Dominicus had to present a “dismissal letter” from the Diocese of Regensburg and was transferred to the jurisdiction of the Salzburg Diocese. He continued to serve as a missionary to the Slavs of the Moosburg principality until his death. The scholar Swarnagel from the Diocese of Salzburg became his successor.

== Landowner at Brunnaron ==
On September 15th, 844, around the time Dominicus came to the court of Pribina, he received lands from King Louis the German at Brunnaron (modern Pilgersdorf) for colonization, taken from the usurped possessions of the cleric Ratpero. This was at the request of Bishop Baturich and the counts Pabo (duke of Carantania) and Werner. The estates were located on the border between the Donaugrafschaft of the Eastern March prefect Radpod and the County of Steinamanger ruled by Rihheri on the Zöbernbach. This deed of donation is the first and only surviving documented mention of the County of Steinamanger under Count Rihheris.

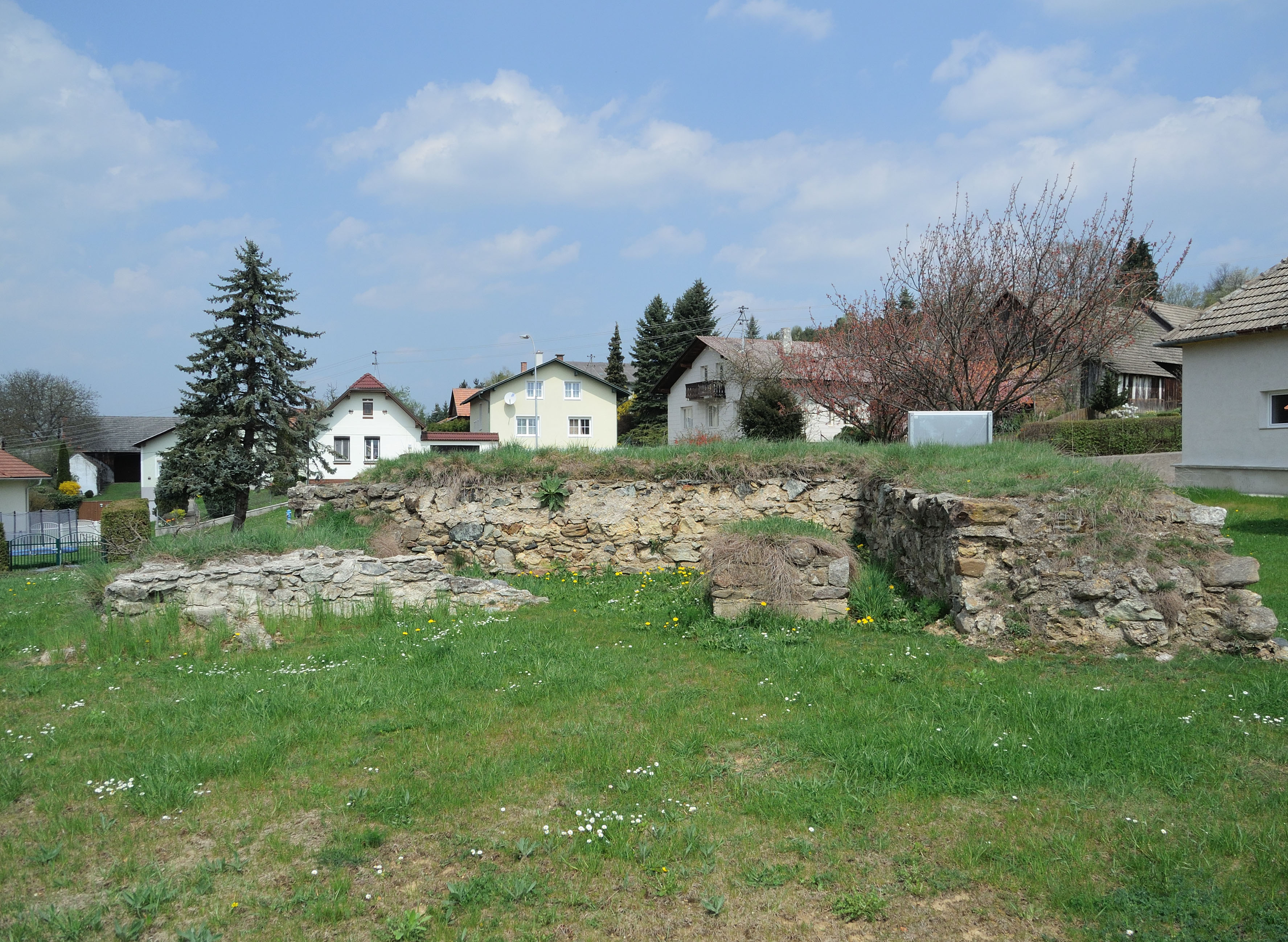
Remains of the church founded by Dominicus in Brunnaron

Here, over the Roman cemetery, Dominicus built the stone church Ecclesia Minigonis (“Church of Dominicus”). The remains of a Carolingian-era church discovered in 1975 during the demolition of a school in the Burgenland municipality of Pilgersdorf are identified with the church built by Dominicus. Because of this donation and the church construction, Pilgersdorf is considered the oldest documented municipality in Burgenland.
