= Duchy of Pannonia =

Duchy of Pannonia may refer to:

- March of Pannonia, the frontier march of the Carolingian Empire
- Duchy of Pannonian Croatia, a medieval duchy in the 9th century
