= Pilgrim I =

Pilgrim I may refer to:

- Pilgrim I (archbishop of Salzburg) (died 923)
- Pellegrino I of Aquileia (died 1161), called Pilgrim I in German
