= Wilhelminer War =

War in medieval Europe

Wilhelminer War was a minor war fought in the March of Pannonia (later Austria) from 882 to 884. It was initially a rebellion of the sons of the margraves William II and Engelschalk I, led by Engelschalk II, against the new margrave Aribo. Svatopluk I of Great Moravia intervened as an ally of Aribo because he had been at war with William and Engelschalk when the two died in 871. The "Wilhelminers" were the descendants of William I of the Traungau, father of the two late margraves.

At first, the rebels were successful, but Aribo appealed to not only Moravia, but also the Emperor Charles the Fat, who confirmed Aribo in his post, to which he had been appointed by Charles' father, Louis the German, back in 871. Svatopluk invaded Pannonia and, capturing one of the Wilhelminer sons, mutilated him. The remaining sons then withdrew from Charles' suzerainty and did homage to Arnulf of Carinthia, Charles' bastard nephew, who thus estranged himself from his uncle. The war between Arnulf and Svatopluk escalated after the former refused to surrender the Wilhelminers after a request. After two and a half years, Charles himself came to Kaumberg to receive Svatopluk as his vassal and accept promises of peace. An actual agreement was not reached between the Moravians and Arnulf until late 885.

The war is generally seen as having greatly augmented the power of Svatopluk I and strengthened his bonds to the Empire, as illustrating Charles diminished authority over his vassals and his inability to control their fidelity, and as rupturing the relationship between uncle and nephew and thus ruining the chances of Arnulf becoming Charles' heir or even receiving imperial largesse. It is disputed whether the war really indicates the weakness or in fact the relative strength of the emperor or whether Arnulf ever had any potential of inheriting the imperial title in the first place.

== Sources ==
- MacLean, Simon. Kingship and Politics in the Late Ninth Century: Charles the Fat and the end of the Carolingian Empire. Cambridge University Press: 2003.
- Reuter, Timothy (trans.) The Annals of Fulda. (Manchester Medieval series, Ninth-Century Histories, Volume II.) Manchester: Manchester University Press, 1992.
