= Pilgrim I (archbishop of Salzburg) =

German priest

Pilgrim I (died 8 October 923) was a Bavarian nobleman and churchman. He served as the archbishop of Salzburg from 907 until his death and was in charge of the East Frankish royal chapel and chancery under Conrad I from 911 until 918.

== Priest ==
Pilgrim was of old Bavarian stock, a member of the Aribonid and Sighardinger kin groups, whose members had at times held the bishopric of Freising in the past. He was already a clergyman when in 889 King Arnulf of Germany granted him a large forest, the Zillertal, which remained under the lordship of the rulers of Salzburg until 1810. Pilgrim maintained good relations with the Carolingian ruling house.

When Theotmar, archbishop of Salzburg, died during the battle of Pressburg in July 907, Pilgrim was appointed to succeed him on 7 September. He was consecrated by 22 October. He probably owed his appointment during such a crisis to his closeness to the royal court. The Hungarian victory at Pressburg, however, meant the loss for Salzburg of its primary mission field. For this, Pilgrim obtained compensation in the form of royal grants.

== Archbishop ==
In 908, Pilgrim received from King Louis IV the royal curtis of Salzburghofen with all its appurtenances, which included the dominant position in the old saltworks at Reichenhall. The nuns of the convent at Altmünster, who probably been forced to abandon the place by the incoming Hungarians, likewise came under the joint protection of Pilgrim, Margrave Aribo of Austria and King Louis.

In 911, the newly-elected Conrad I, the first non-Carolingian German king, appointed Pilgrim the archchaplain and archchancellor of his court. In September 916, Pilgrim attended the synod of the entire kingdom at Hohenaltheim. There it was decided by the bishops to support the king and condemn the rebellions of Duke Arnulf of Bavaria and Duke Erchanger of Swabia. It was also decided to bring the German church close to the Papacy. Consequently, Arnulf went into exile in Hungary and Pilgrim took charge of Bavaria in his absence.

Arnulf returned following Conrad's death in 918 and the Bavarian nobility apparently elected him king in opposition to Conrad's successor, Henry I. In 921 Henry and Arnulf came to an agreement, whereby the former recognised the latter's autonomy within Bavaria in return for his recognition as king. Henry admitted Arnulf's right to appoint bishops, which greatly reduced Pilgrim's status. He was no longer royal archchaplain whose political influence was kingdom-wide and was reduced to the metropolitan of a distinctly Bavarian church.

== Sources ==
- Dopsch, Heinz (2001). "Pilgrim I.". Neue Deutsche Biographie. Vol. 20. Berlin: Duncker & Humblot. pp. 441–42.
- Eldevik, John (2012). Episcopal Power and Ecclesiastical Reform in the German Empire: Tithes, Lordship and Community, 950–1150. Cambridge: Cambridge University Press.
