= Christa Meier =

German politician (1941–2024)

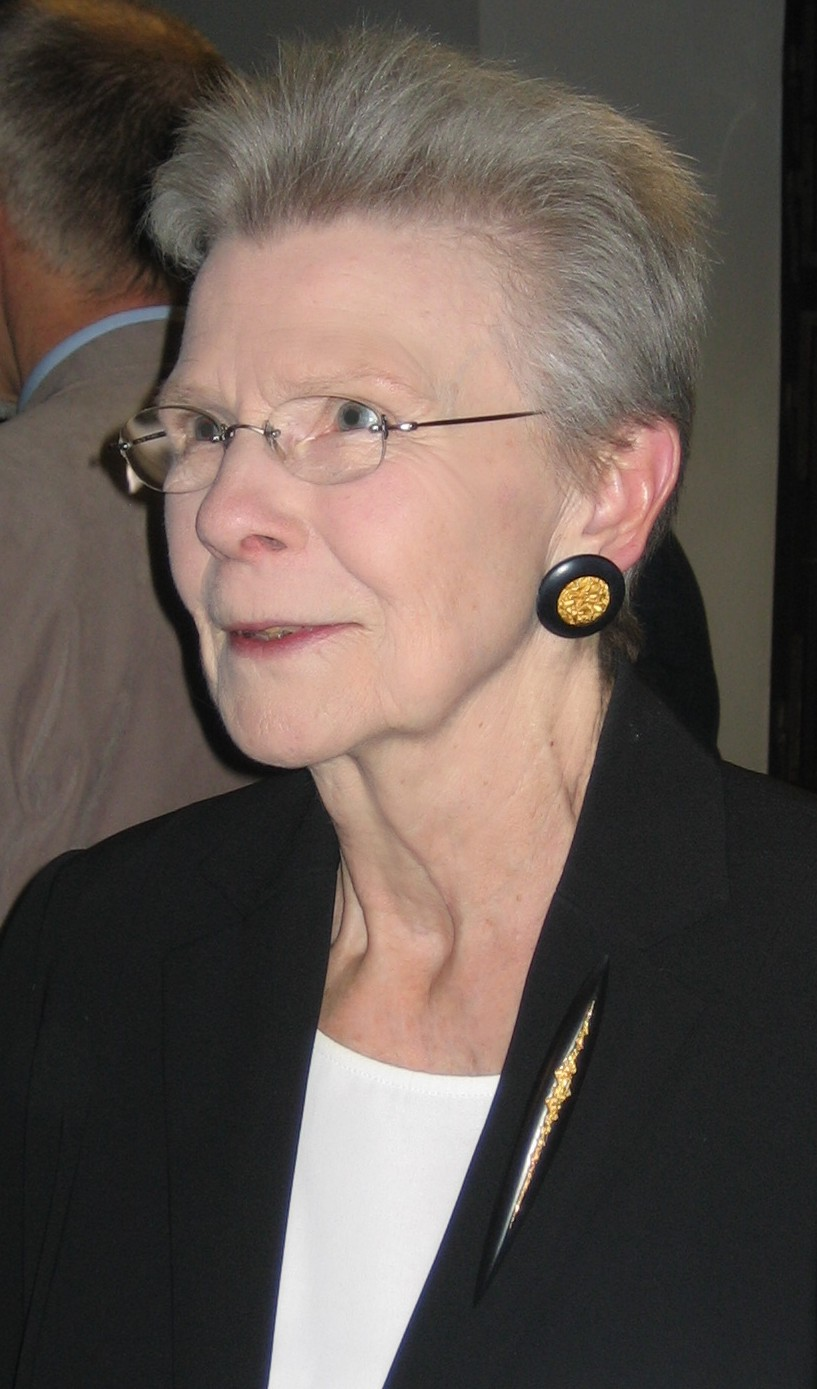
- Meier in 2017

Member of the Landtag of Bavaria
- In office 30 October 1978 – 3 May 1990

Mayor of Regensburg
- In office 1990–1996
- Preceded by: Friedrich Viehbacher
- Succeeded by: Hans Schaidinger

Personal details
- Born: Christa Stangl; 6 December 1941 Regensburg, Germany
- Died: 1 December 2024 (aged 82)
- Party: SPD
- Occupation: Schoolteacher

Christa Meier (née Stangl; 6 December 1941 – 1 December 2024) was a German politician. A member of the Social Democratic Party, she served in the Landtag of Bavaria from 1978 to 1990 and was mayor of Regensburg from 1990 to 1996, the first woman to serve in this position.

Meier died on 1 December 2024, at the age of 82.
