= List of mayors of Regensburg =

This is a list of mayors of Regensburg. It includes the First Mayors (Erster Bürgermeister) and Lord Mayors of Regensburg (Oberbürgermeister der Stadt Regensburg) since 1811/1818.

| From | To | Mayor |
|---|---|---|
| 1811 | 1814 | Franz Xaver Gruber |
| 1814 | 1815 | Kitzinger |
| 1815 | 1818 | Josef Bohonowsky |
| 1818 | 1828 | Johann Karl Martin Mauerer |
| 1828 | 1832 | Sigmund Maria Edler von Eggelkraut |
| 1832 | 1835 | Friedrich Brügel |
| 1836 | 1848 | Gottlieb Freiherr von Thon-Dittmer |
| 1849 | 1856 | Georg Satzinger |
| 1856 | 1868 | Friedrich Schubarth |
| 1868 | 1903 | Oskar von Stobaeus |
| 1903 | 1910 | Hermann Geib |
| 1910 | 1910 | Alfons Auer |
| 1910 | 1914 | Otto Geßler |
| 1914 | 1920 | Josef Bleyer |
| 1920 | 1933 | Otto Hipp |
| 1933 | 1945 | Otto Schottenheim |
| 1945 | 1946 | Dr. Gerhard Tietze |
| 1946 | 1948 | Alfons Heiß |
| 1948 | 1952 | Georg Zitzler |
| 1952 | 1959 | Hans Herrmann |
| 1959 | 1978 | Rudolf Schlichtinger |
| 1978 | 1990 | Friedrich Viehbacher |
| 1990 | 1996 | Christa Meier |
| 1996 | 2014 | Hans Schaidinger |
| 2014 | 2020 | Joachim Wolbergs |
| 2020 | | Gertrud Maltz-Schwarzfischer |
