= Huosi =

Ancient noble family in the duchy of Bavaria

The Huosi family was one of the Uradel (ancient noble families) in the Duchy of Bavaria. Their status was enshrined in the Law of the Bavarians, which lists them first among the five families having special rights privileges after the ducal Agilolfing dynasty. The area where they held much land became known as the pagus Huosi or "Huosiland". This was the area between the rivers Isar and Lech and north of Freising.

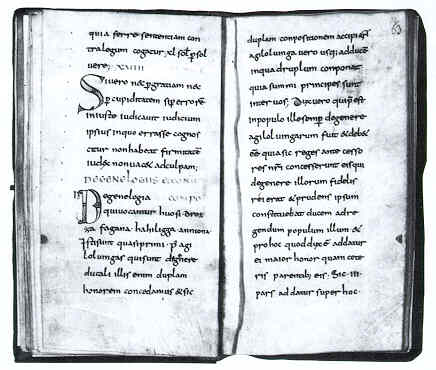
The Law of the Bavarians enshrined the Huosi's rights

The origins of the Huosi are unclear. The dynasty appears to have started as petty Germanic chieftains under the Ostrogoths, after Theodoric the Great took over the former Roman provinces with access to the Italian peninsula from Odoaker, included the Alamanni refuged in Raetia from Clovis' Franks. Sometime around the Christianization of Germany, the Huosi were converted to Chalcedonian Christianity from Germanic paganism, although it is probable that some were already Arians.

Several descendants held the office of a Bishop of Freising in the 9th century. They may have affiliated with the later Luitpolding dynasty. One of them was Arbeo of Freising (723 or earlier near Meran – 4 May 784), an early medieval author and Bishop of Freising from 764.

Many abbeys in southern Bavaria such as Benediktbeuern, Ilmmünster, Scharnitz, Schlehdorf and Tegernsee were founded in the 8th century by people who were reportedly members of the Huosi.

== Bibliography ==
- Hammer, Carl I. (2018). Huosiland: A Small Country in Carolingian Europe. Archaeopress.
