= Abrogans =

8th century Latin–Old High German glossary

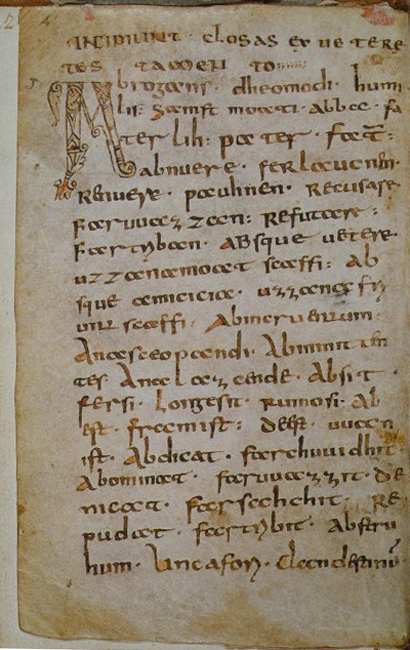
First page of the St. Gall Codex Abrogens (Stiftsbibliothek, cod. 911) Heading: INCIPIUNT CLOSAS EX VETERE TESTAMENTO ("Here begins the commentary on the Old Testament")

Abrogans, also German Abrogans or Codex Abrogans (St Gall, Stiftsbibliothek, Cod. 911), is a Middle Latin–Old High German glossary, whose preserved copy in the Abbey Library of St Gall is regarded as the oldest preserved book in the German language.

Dating from the 8th century (765–775), the glossary contains approximately 3,670 Old High German words in over 14,600 examples and is therefore a valuable source for the knowledge of the oldest Upper German language. It was named by German researchers after its first entry: abrogans = dheomodi (German: demütig = modest, humble).

On several occasions the South Tyrolean bishop Arbeo of Freising († 783 or 784) or the Benedictine monk Kero are named as authors.

== General Information ==
The German Abrogans is a Latin – Old High German thesaurus, which was not, however, produced from a collection of Latin – Old High German translations, but structured on a pure Latin, alphabetically-sorted thesaurus. This Latin–Latin glossary, the Latin Abrogans, was probably compiled in Italy (possibly in the important southern Italian monastery Vivarium) of numerous older late-antiquity and early medieval glossaries. Thus arose a dictionary in which rare expressions, above all from biblical Latin, were explained.

The dictionary was likely finally translated into German in the second half of the 8th century in the old Bavarian bishopric Freising, which came under control of the bishop Arbeo (he was bishop here from 764 to 783). At the same time, both the Latin key word and its Latin reproduction were entered with the Old High German equivalents. For example:

faterlih	fater
abba	pater

This arrangement often led to poor translations around the middle of the 8th century, for example translations in which parts of speech were erroneously exchanged. Nevertheless, the Abrogans offers tremendous material for linguistics, which still today is not yet completely analyzed. It includes about 700 words that do not appear in any other Old High German texts.

== Tradition ==
No specimens from the time of origin of the glossary in the 8th century have been saved. Only three younger Alemannic copies of the Bavarian document are preserved. The best, albeit mangled handwriting is the direct copy of the archetype that was made around 810 in Murbach for Charlemagne (Baesecke) or in Regensburg under Bishop Baturich (Bernhard Bischoff). (Paris, Bibl. Nat., cod. lat. 7640, f. 124r-132v).

== Literature ==
- Bernhard Bischoff (Publisher.): Die „Abrogans“-Handschrift der Stiftsbibliothek St. Gallen. Das älteste deutsche Buch. Zollikofer, St. Gallen 1977. (German)
  1. Faksimile.
  2. Kommentar und Transkription.
- Jochen Splett: Abrogans deutsch. In: Verfasserlexikon. Band 1. 1978. Sp. 12–15. (German)
- Jochen Splett: Abrogans-Studien. Kommentar zum ältesten deutschen Wörterbuch. Steiner, Wiesbaden 1976, ISBN 3-515-02086-1, (Zugleich: Münster, Univ., Habilitations-Schrift, 1972). (German)
