= Innichen Abbey =

Former Benedictine monastery in northern Italy

Coordinates: 46°43′58″N 12°16′58″E

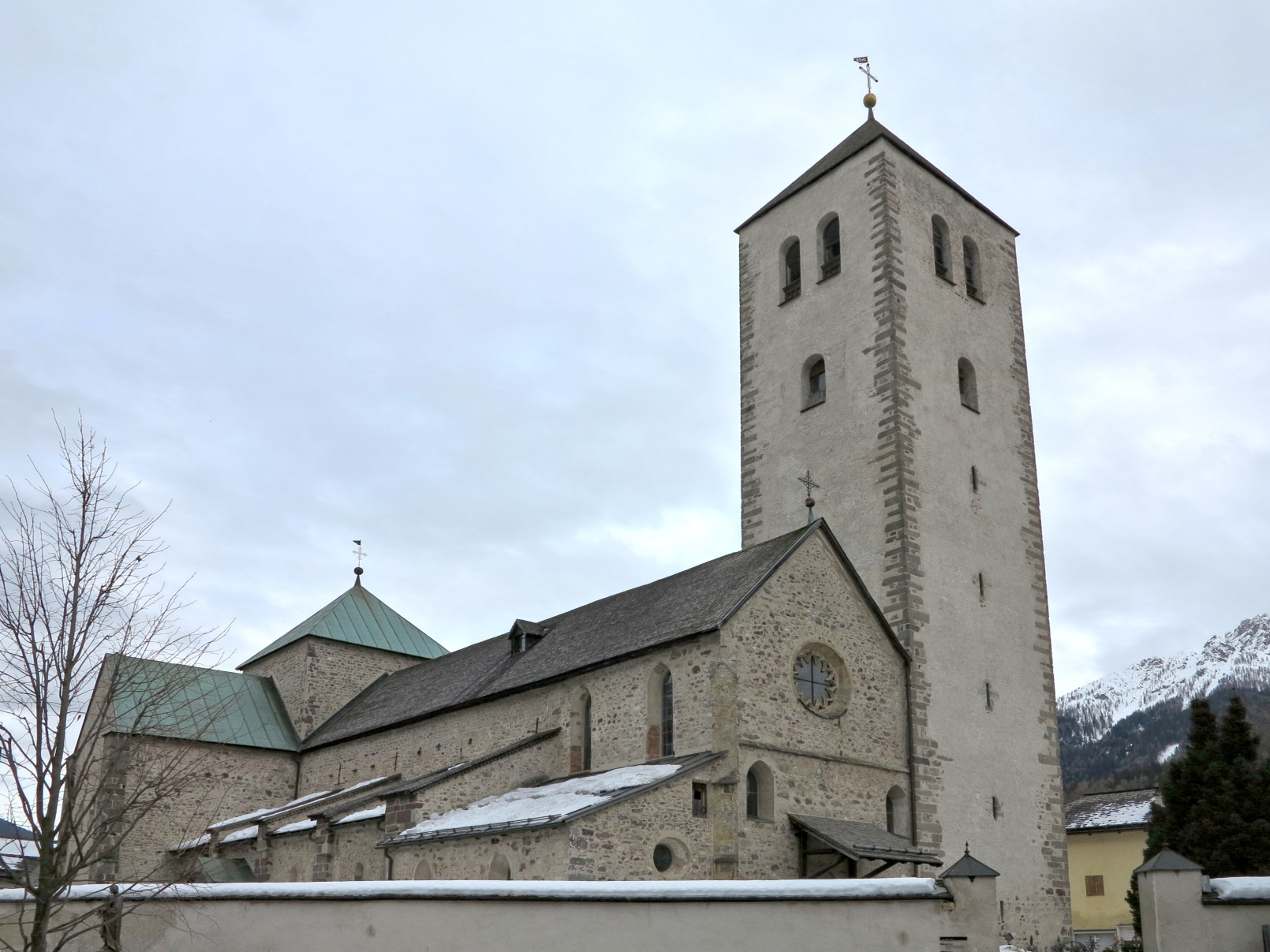
Façade of the collegiate church

Innichen Abbey (German: Stift Innichen) is a former Benedictine monastery in Innichen, South Tyrol in northern Italy. Founded in the 8th century, its collegiate church dedicated to Saint Candidus, rebuilt in the 12th–13th centuries, is considered the most important Romanesque building in Tyrol and the Eastern Alps. It is home to a 13th-century sculpture and a fresco cycle from the same age in the dome.

== History ==
The original nucleus of the complex was established in 769, when Duke Tassilo III of Bavaria gave to Abbot Atto of Scharnitz extended estates lands in the Puster Valley stretching from the Gsieser Bach at current Welsberg eastwards down the Drava to Anras, called India, provided that a Benedictine convent would be founded here to convert the pagan Slavs who had settled in the principality of Carantania. When Atto became Bishop of Freising in 783, he added Innichen to his episcopal territories. Of the original abbey construction, however, no certain traces have been found.

When the monastery was turned into a college of canons, the church was entirely rebuilt from about 1140; of this edifice today the external walls, the piers, the apses and the crypt remain. A second reconstruction was carried out from around 1240, when the vaults of the crypt and the nave, the transept and the dome at the crossing were added, including the frescoes with the History of Creation. Once finished, the new church in 1284 was consecrated to Sts. Candidus and Corbinian, patron saint of the Diocese of Freising, to which the abbey still belonged at the time. The large bell tower was built later, from 1323 to 1326.

The edifice did not undergo any substantial modification. In 1969 a restoration was held, removing the few minor additions it had received during the centuries (especially in Baroque times), in particular re-discovering the crypt's frescoes, which had been covered with a layer of plaster.

== Description ==
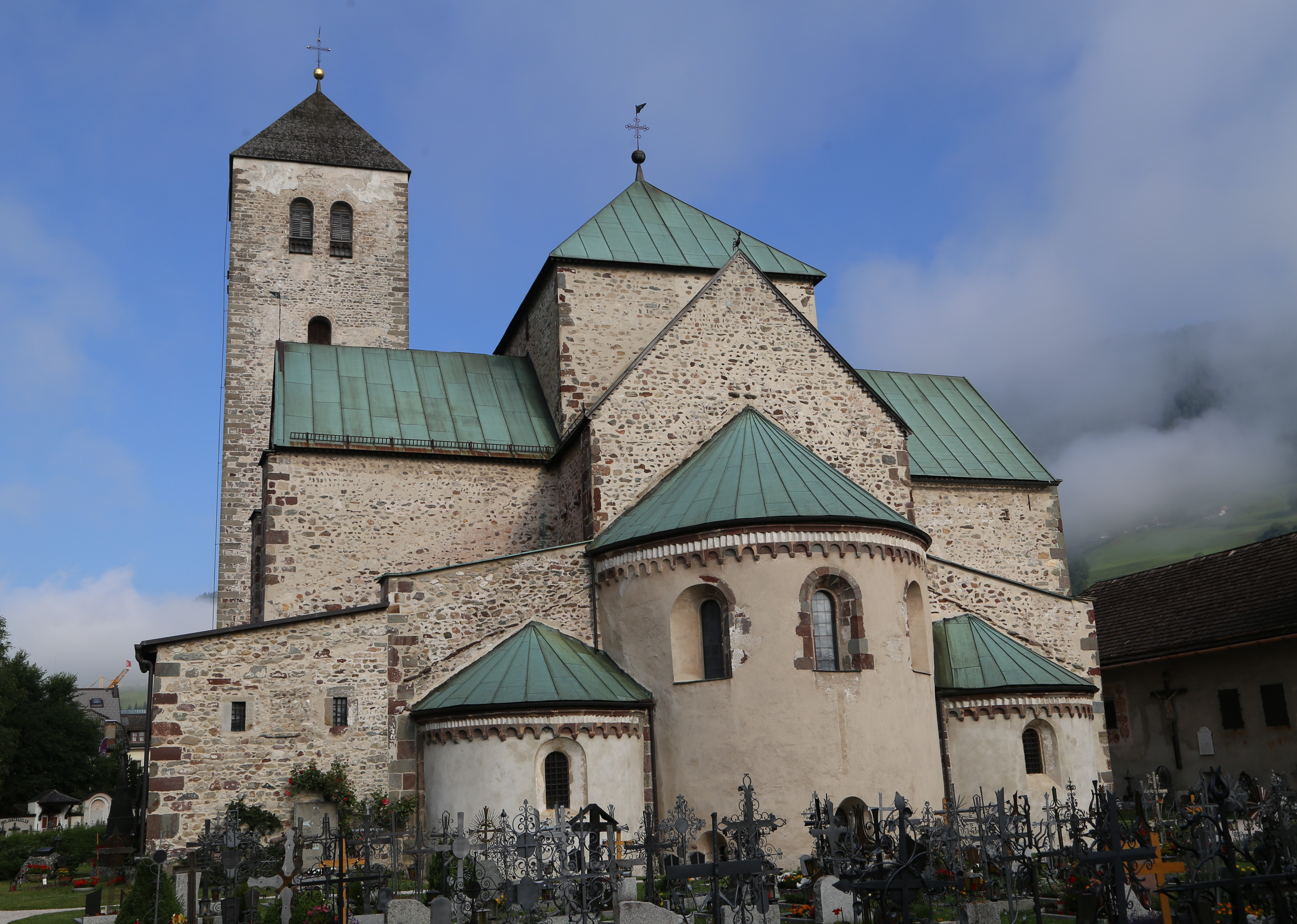
Rear view

=== Exterior ===
The church has a simple façade, in crude stone blocks. Over the central portal are two small mullioned windows, surmounted by a small frame dividing the façade in two and a rose window. On the left is the massive bell tower, also in stone, with a square plane: each of the sides has a row of thin mullioned windows, except for the top floors, which have a larger single- and double- mullioned windows. The top is pyramidal in shape.

The rear area is more complex. The crossing is the background of a descending sequence of blocks, started by the presbytery, and followed by the nave's apse, the roofs of the aisles' apses and finally the apses themselves. Another block on the left is the sacristy. The apses' exterior is decorated by Lombard bands.

On the right side are a pilaster-shaped tabernacle, frescoed in the 15th century, and the Museum of the Collegiate.

=== Interior ===
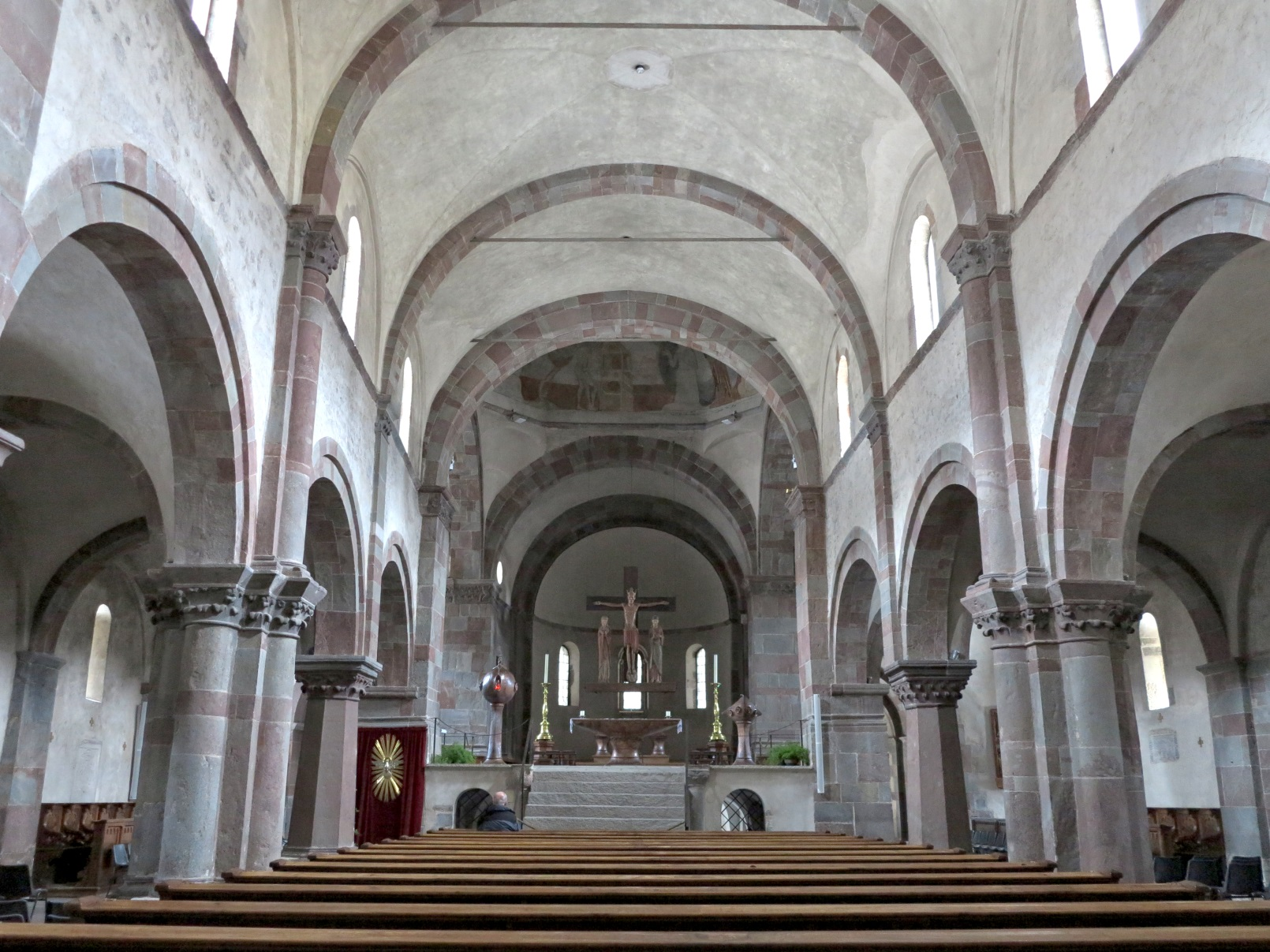
Interior

The interior has a nave and two aisles, the latter smaller in height, with a transept, a presbytery and three aisles. At the crossing is a crypt. This houses a 13th-century wooden sculpture portraying on the two patron saints of the church.

The dome is frescoed with the Stories of Creation, painted in the 13th century.

== Sources ==
- Kühebacher, Egon (1993). Kirche und Museum des Stiftes Innichen (in German). Bolzano: Athesia. ISBN 978-88-7014-721-6.
