= Hans Schaidinger =

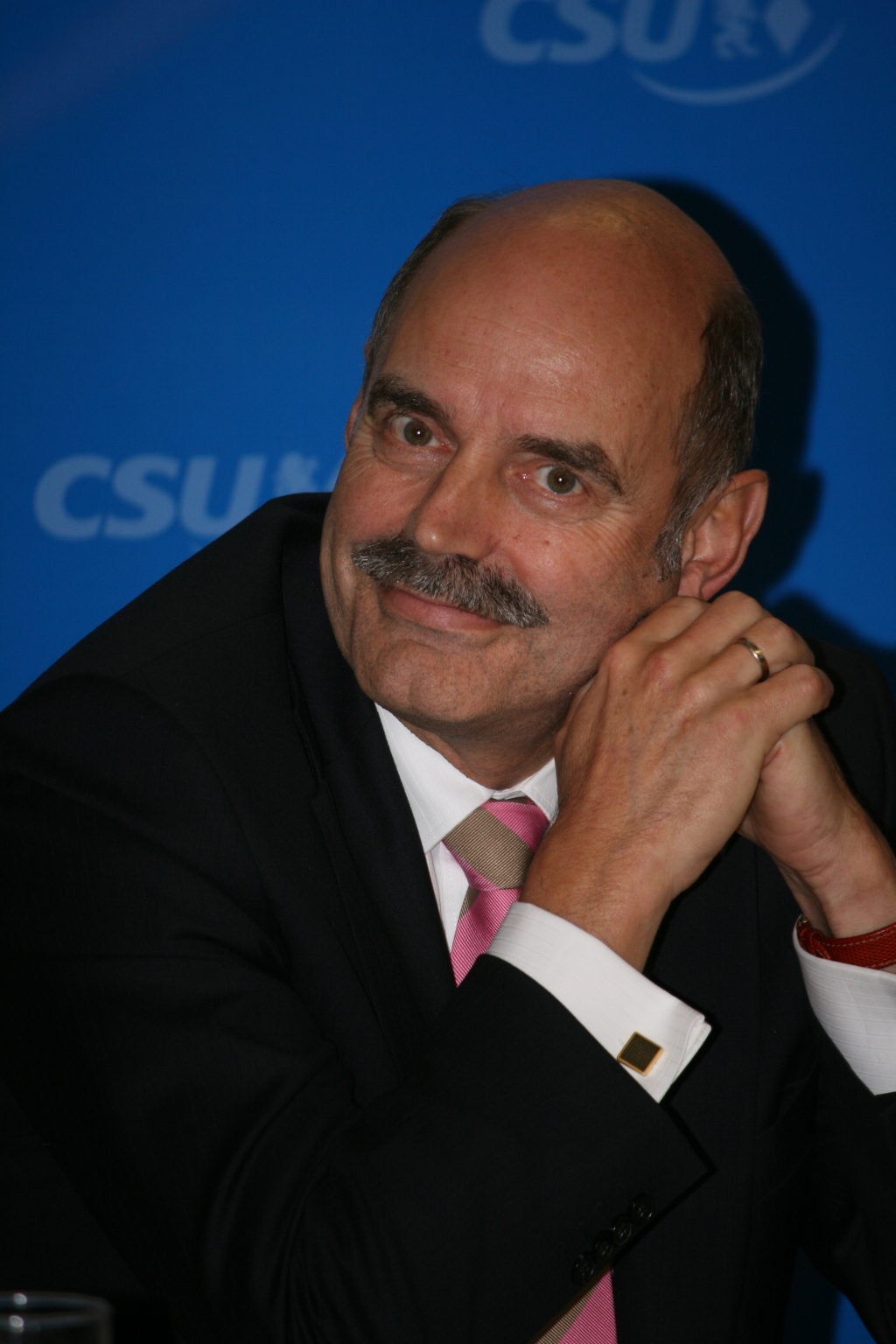

Mayor of Regensburg
- In office 1996–2014
- Preceded by: Christa Meier
- Succeeded by: Joachim Wolbergs

Personal details
- Born: 1949 (age 75–76); Freilassing, Bavaria, Germany
- Political party: Christian Social Union
- Children: 2
- Profession: Politician

Hans Schaidinger (born 1949 in Freilassing; member of the Christian Social Union of Bavaria) is a former mayor of the city of Regensburg, Germany from 1996 to 2014. He studied economics (exam 1977), is married and father of two daughters. Schaidinger entered service for the city of Regensburg in 1978 and was working in the areas of economy support and city development. From 1991 to 1996 he was working for the DIBAG Industriebau AG in Munich. In 1996 he was first elected mayor of Regensburg and reelected in 2002 and 2008.
