= Wilhelminers =

Bavarian noble family

The Wilhelminers were a noble Bavarian family of the 9th century. They rose to prominence mid-century under the brothers William and Engelschalk I, sons of William I, the founder of the family. The family held the March of Pannonia until 871, but their possession of it was the cause of a dispute, the Wilhelminer War, with the Aribonids. In the dispute the Wilhelminers had the support of Arnulf of Carinthia and Svatopluk of Moravia.

The Wilhelminers regained some of their lost importance after Arnulf became king in 887. In 893, however, they came into the hatred of the Bavarian aristocracy, who summarily blinded Engelschalk II without royal approval. The subsequent years saw some Wilhelminers fleeing to Moravia and others expelled from court. They soon disappear from view.

== Sources ==
- Reuter, Timothy. Germany in the Early Middle Ages 800–1056. New York: Longman, 1991.
- MacLean, Simon. Kingship and Politics in the Late Ninth Century: Charles the Fat and the end of the Carolingian Empire. Cambridge University Press: 2003.
- Reuter, Timothy (trans.) The Annals of Fulda. (Manchester Medieval series, Ninth-Century Histories, Volume II.) Manchester: Manchester University Press, 1992.
