= Freilassing =

- Town
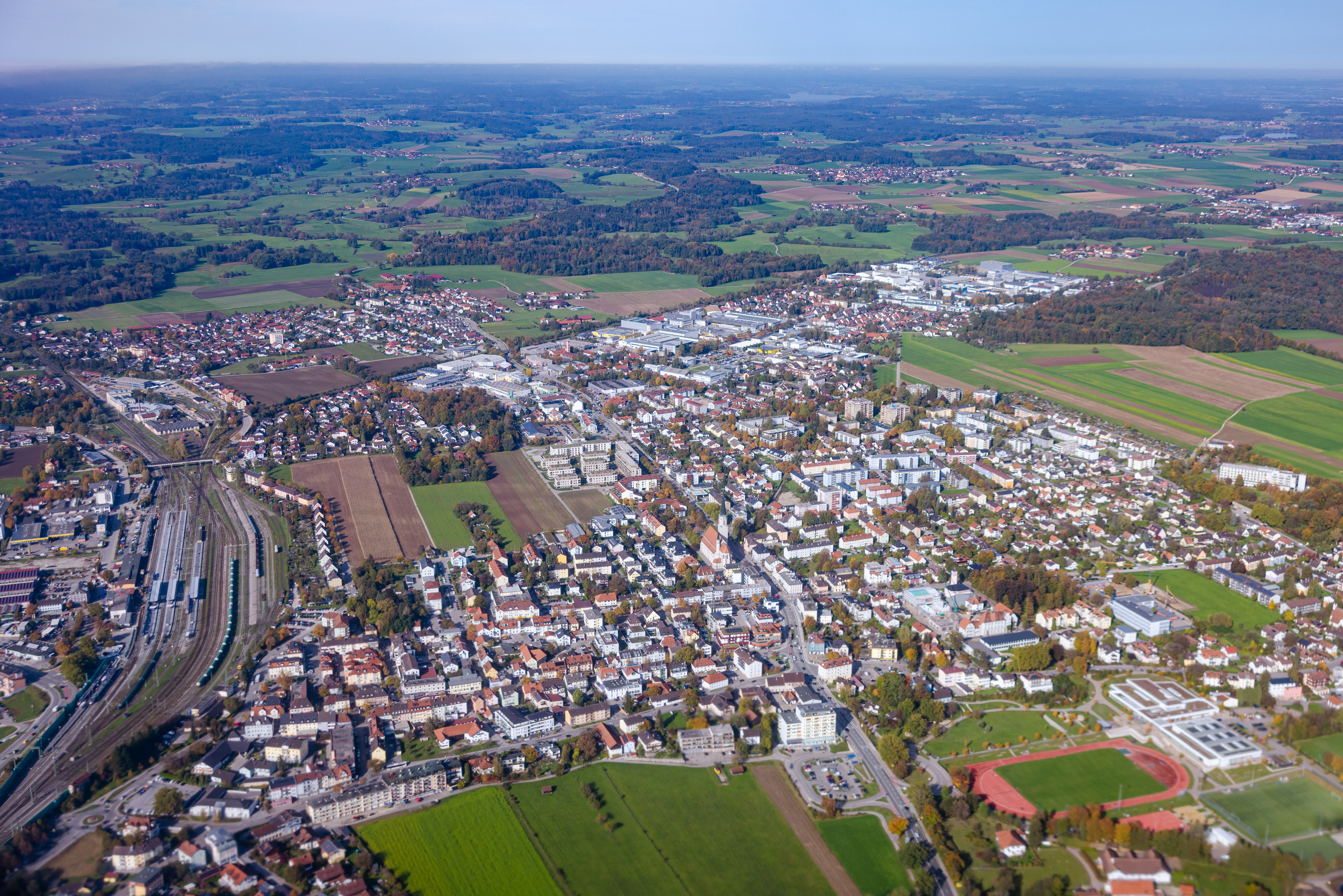
- View of Freilassing

- Coat of arms

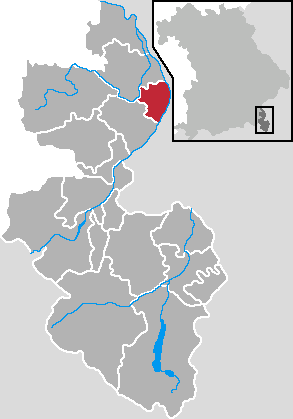
- Location of Freilassing within Berchtesgadener Land district
- Interactive map of Freilassing
- Location within Germany Location within Bavaria
- Coordinates: 47°50′N 12°58′E
- Country: Germany
- State: Bavaria
- Admin. region: Oberbayern
- District: Berchtesgadener Land

Government
  - Mayor (2020–26): Markus Hiebl

Area
  - Total: 14.81 km^{2} (5.72 sq mi)
- Elevation: 423 m (1,388 ft)

Population (2025-12-31)
  - Total: 17,702
  - Density: 1,195/km^{2} (3,096/sq mi)
- Time zone: UTC+01:00 (CET)
  - Summer (DST): UTC+02:00 (CEST)
- Postal codes: 83395
- Dialling codes: 08654
- Vehicle registration: BGL
- Website: www.freilassing.de

Freilassing (German pronunciation: [fʁaɪˈlasɪŋ]), until 1923 Salzburghofen is a town of some 16,000 inhabitants in the southeastern corner of Bavaria, Germany. It belongs to the "Regierungsbezirk" Oberbayern and the "Landkreis" (County) of Berchtesgadener Land. Located very close to the German-Austrian border, Freilassing can be seen as the biggest satellite of Salzburg, the centre of which is eight kilometres (five miles) away, on the other side of the border.

== History ==
As proved by excavations, the area was already settled in the Neolithic times. Celts and later Romans established permanent settlements. First mentioned in 885 in a Carolingian document, the peasant village named Salzburghofen was given to the archbishop of Salzburg by King Louis IV in 908. After the Napoleonic Wars in 1816, the border between Bavaria and Austria was drawn along the rivers Saalach and Salzach, and Salzburghofen became part of Bavaria. The railway line connecting Munich and Salzburg (and further on to Vienna) changed the appearance of the village significantly. First, the railway company paid good prices for the land of the farmers. Second, many jobs were created, more than 1,000 in the 1970s.

In 1923, the name of the village was changed to Freilassing. Since the railway was of strategic interest and was also used by top Nazis on their way to Berchtesgaden during the war, Freilassing became a target for the Allied forces. In addition, a depot of the Wehrmacht (the German army) was situated close to the station. On April 25, 1945, only a few days before the end of World War II, British and American bombers destroyed Freilassing almost completely.

Due to the expulsion of many Germans from the eastern territories, the population of Freilassing grew and reached 7,700 in 1952. Thus, Freilassing became "Stadt" (city) in 1954. Since then, the population has doubled.

== Geography ==
Freilassing is located in the valley of the rivers Salzach and Saalach, which merge close to the northern part of the town. To the south and the east, the Alps rise to altitudes of more than 2,000 m. To the north and west, rolling hills dominate the landscape.

== Economy ==
Cattle farming and timber industry were major economic branches before the railroad era. The railway has dominated the economy for a long time since the construction of the Munich–Salzburg line in 1860. Beginning in the mid-1970s, the DB (German railways) gradually centralised their organisation. Hence, the importance of the railway as an employer diminished. Several small and midsize companies, especially in mechanical engineering, provide jobs.

== Transportation ==
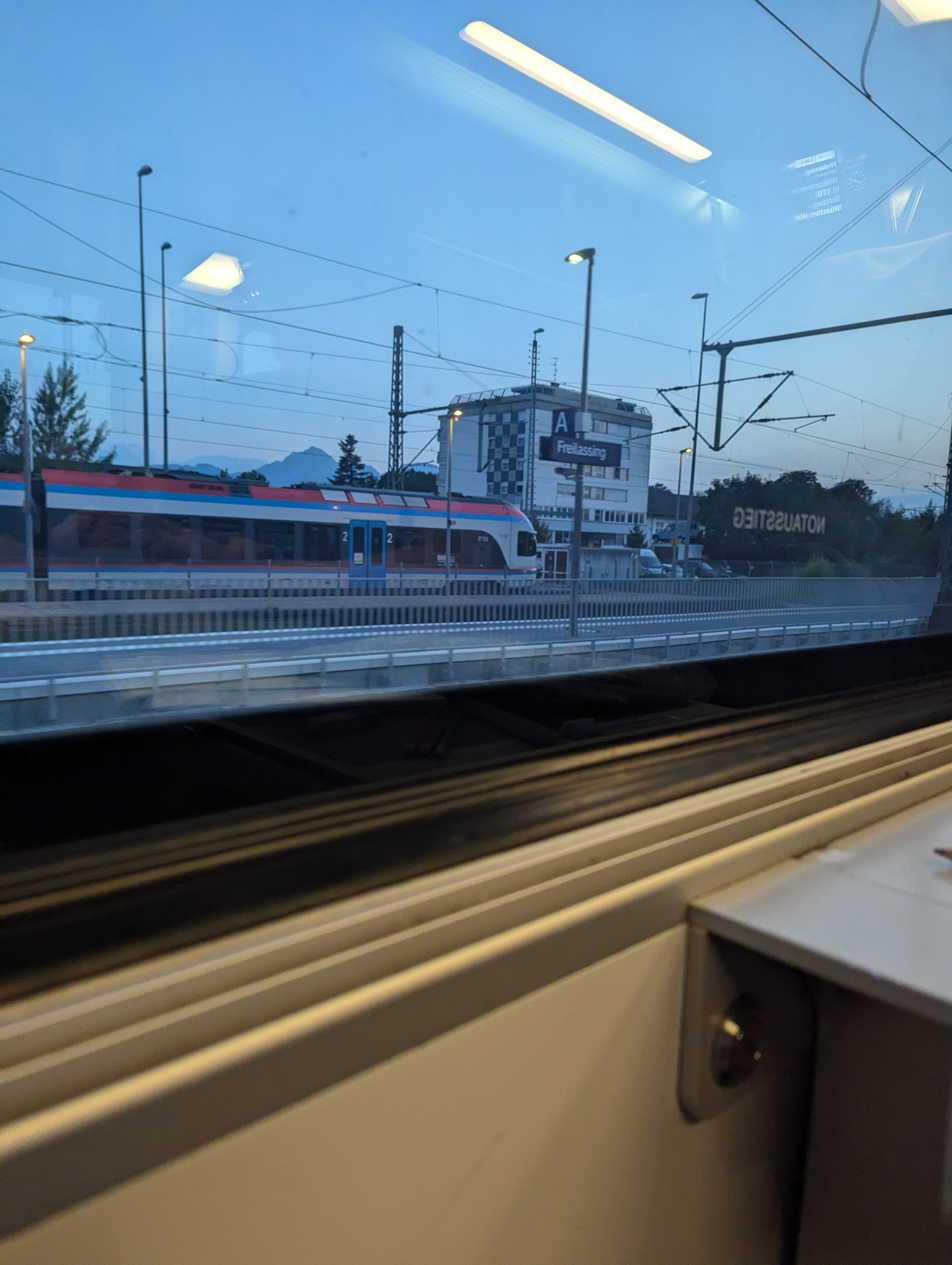
Freilassing station

Trains stop at Freilassing Station.

== Born in Freilassing ==
- Florian Grassl (born 1980), skeleton pilot
- Fritz Schmidt (1900–1982), aviation engineer and university professor
- Hans Schaidinger (born 1949), former mayor of Regensburg
- Katharina Trost, athlete

== Gallery ==
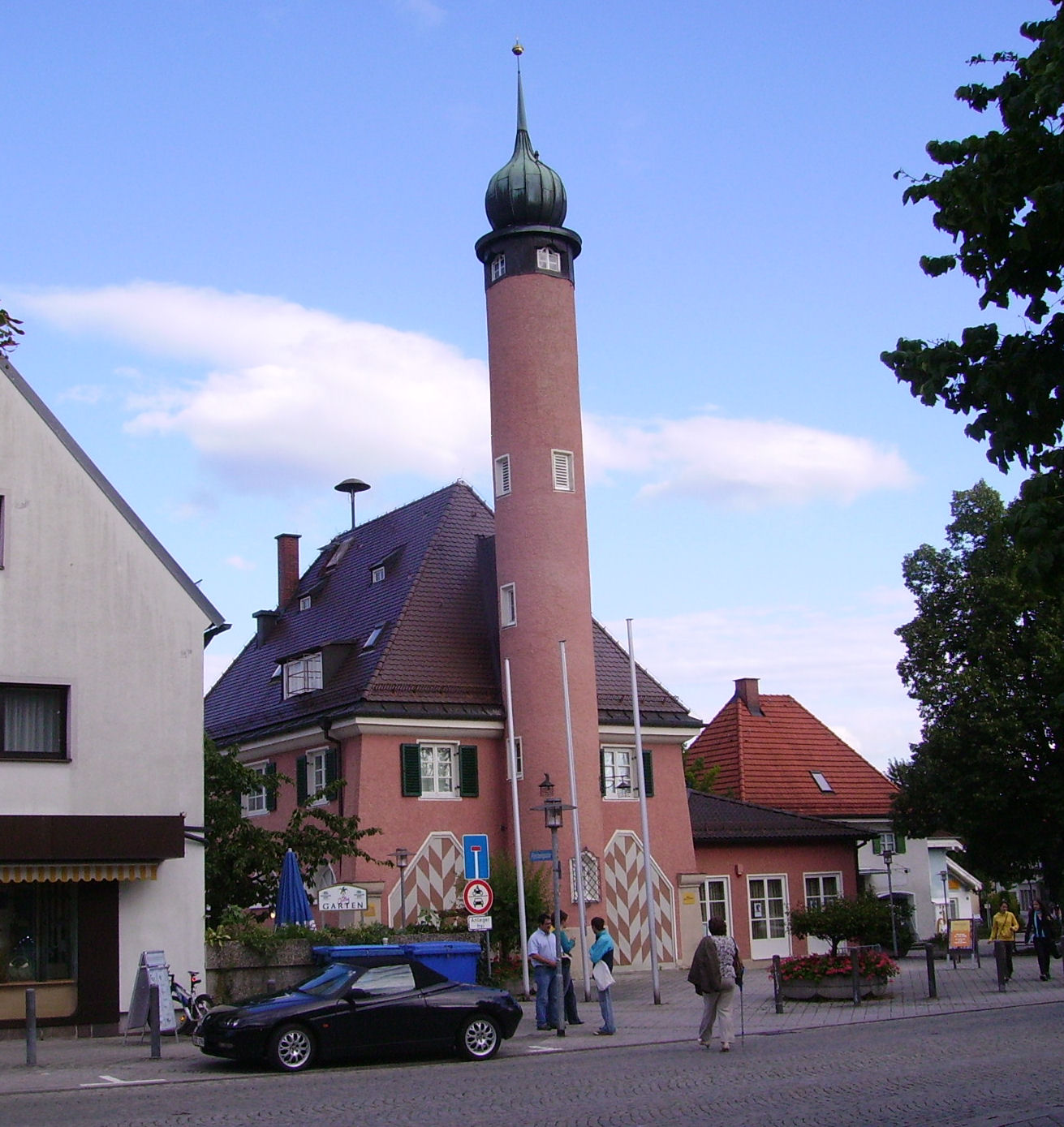
Stadtmuseum

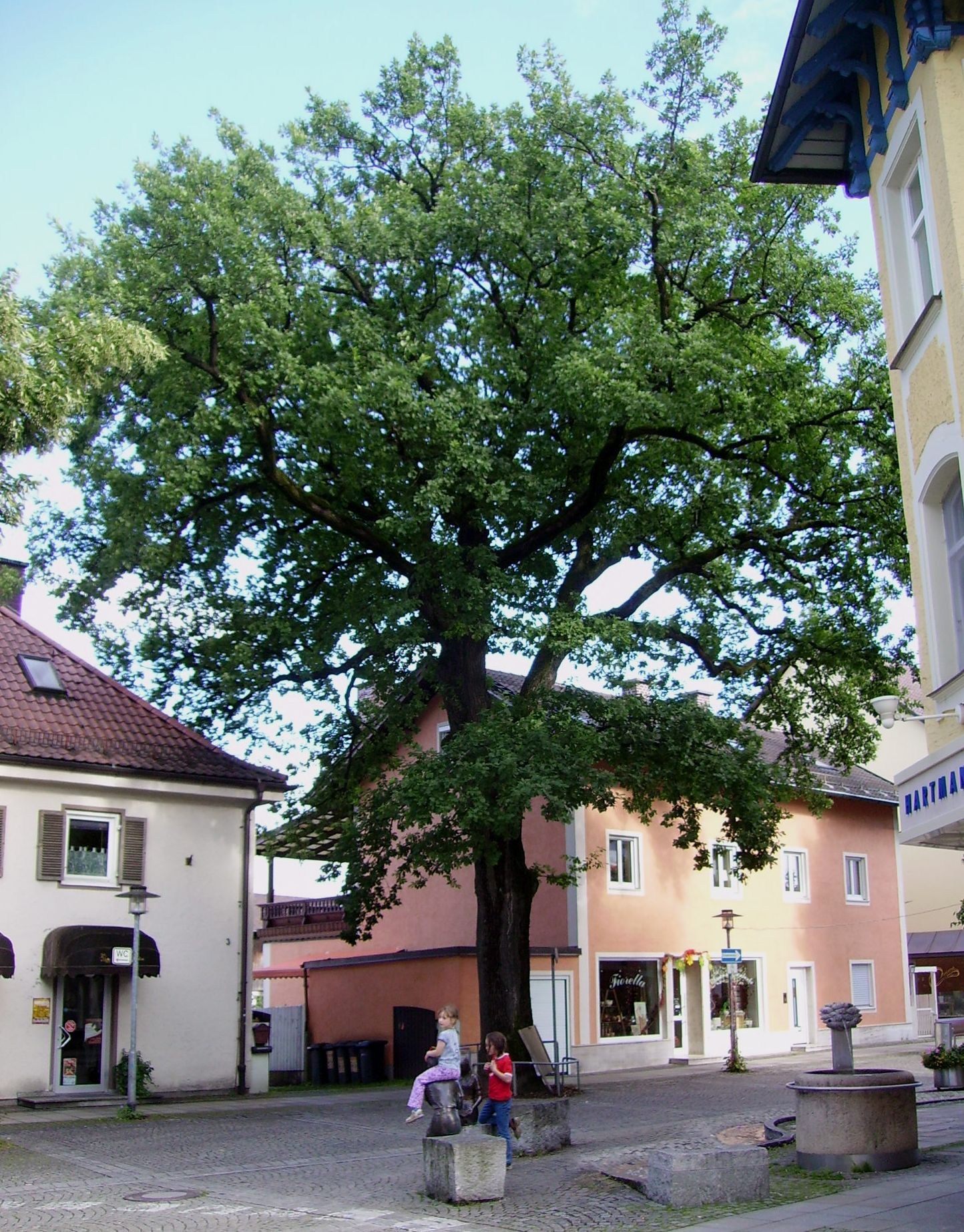
Friedenslinde

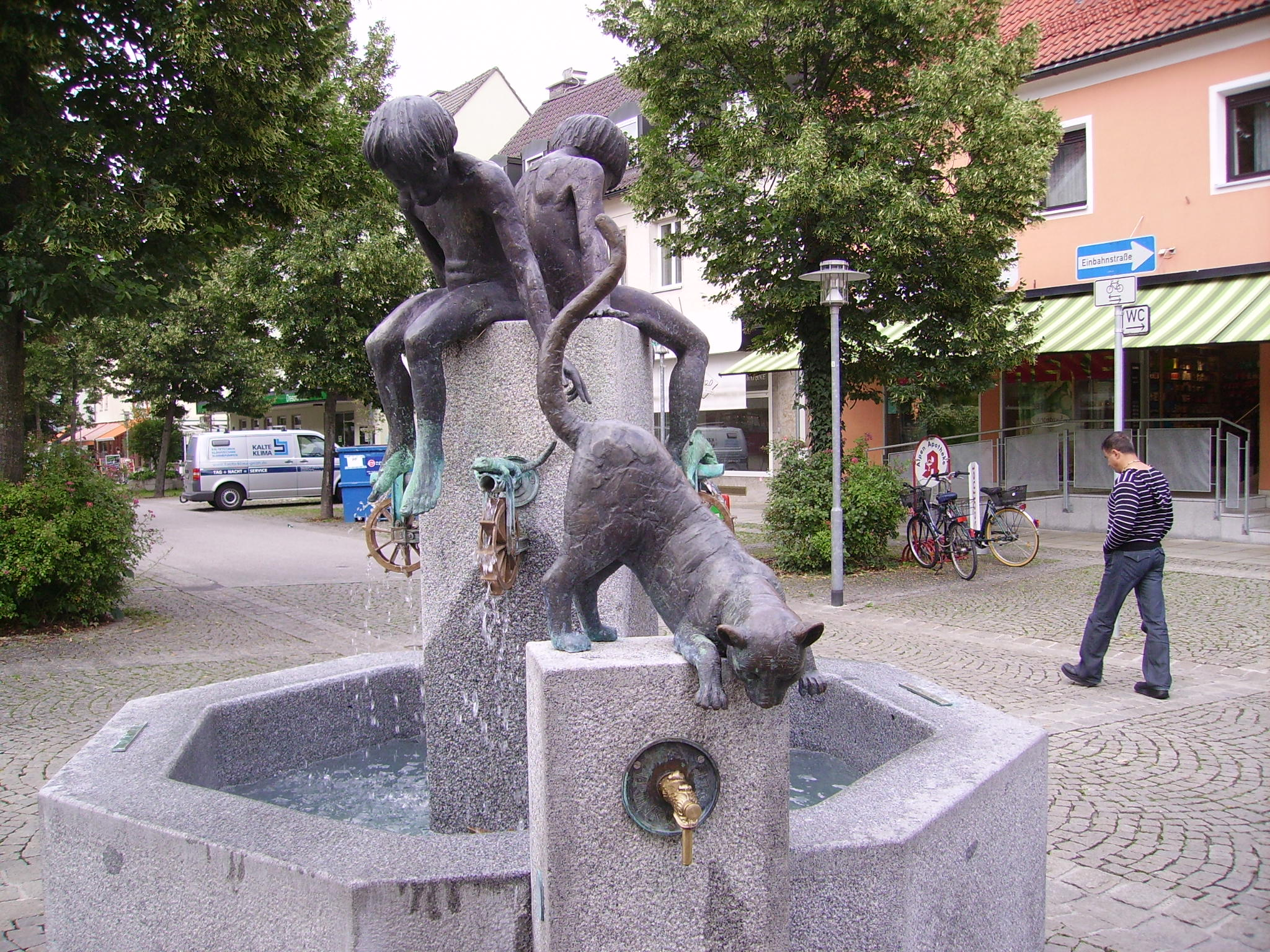
Fountain

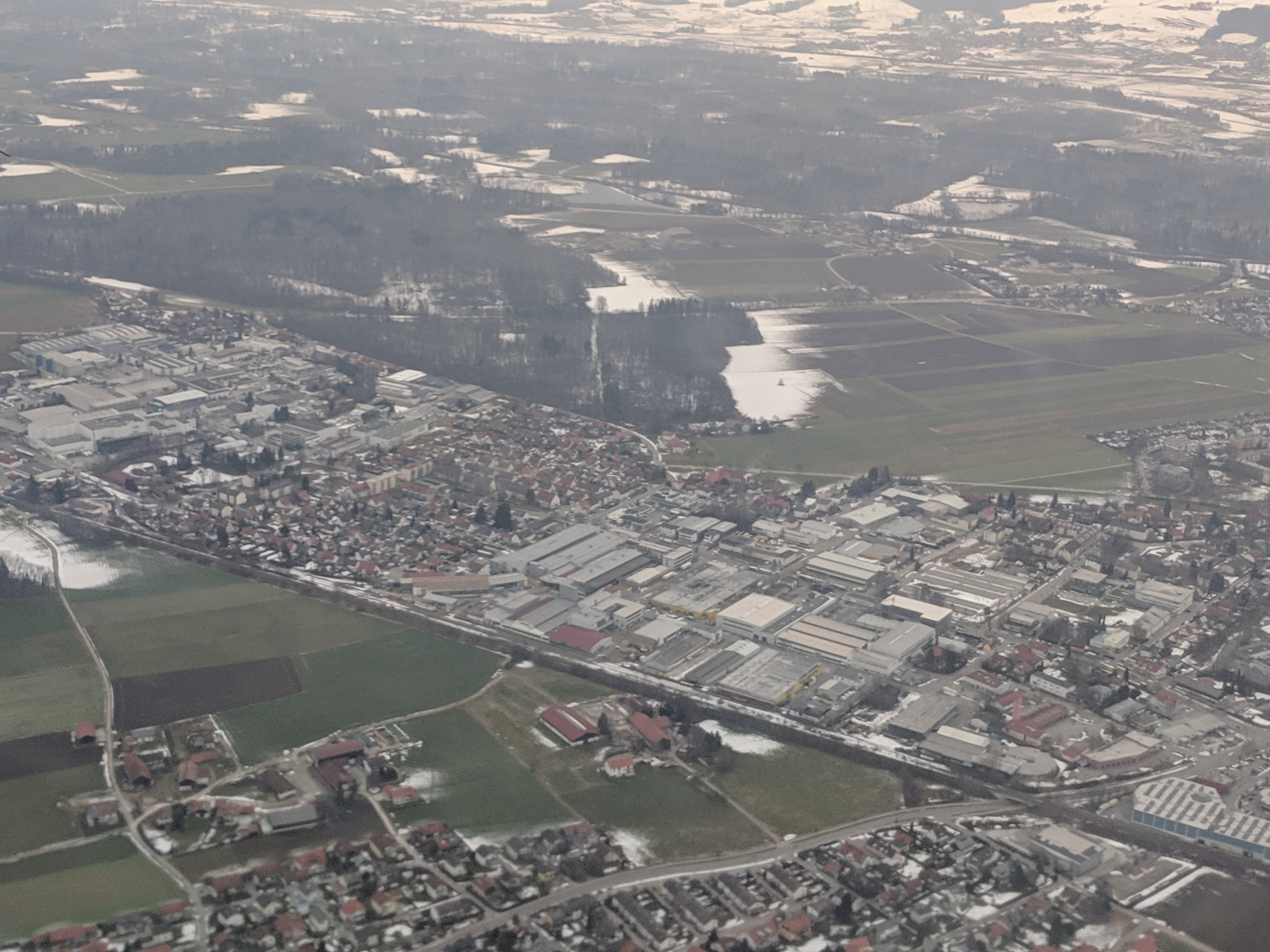
From the air

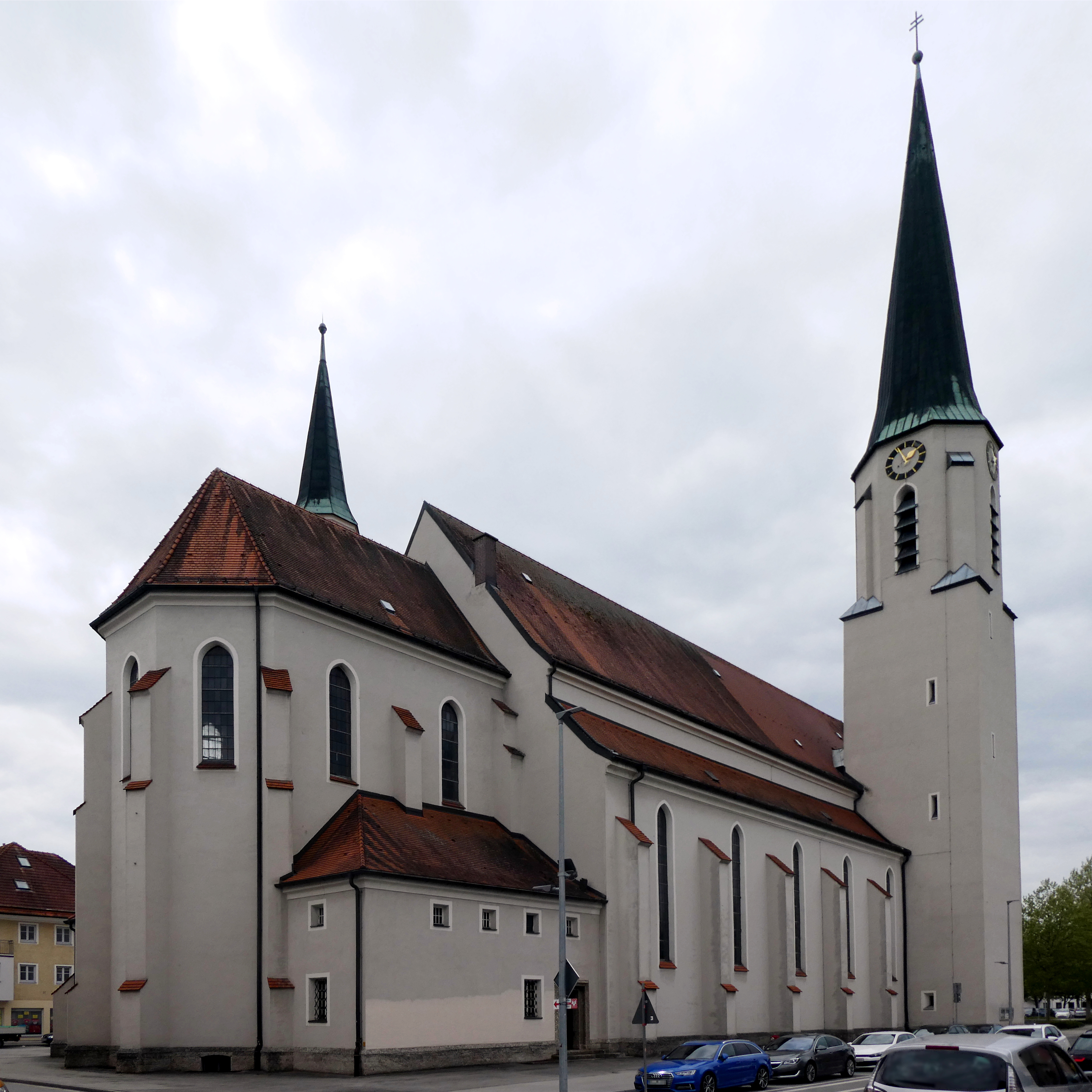
Church

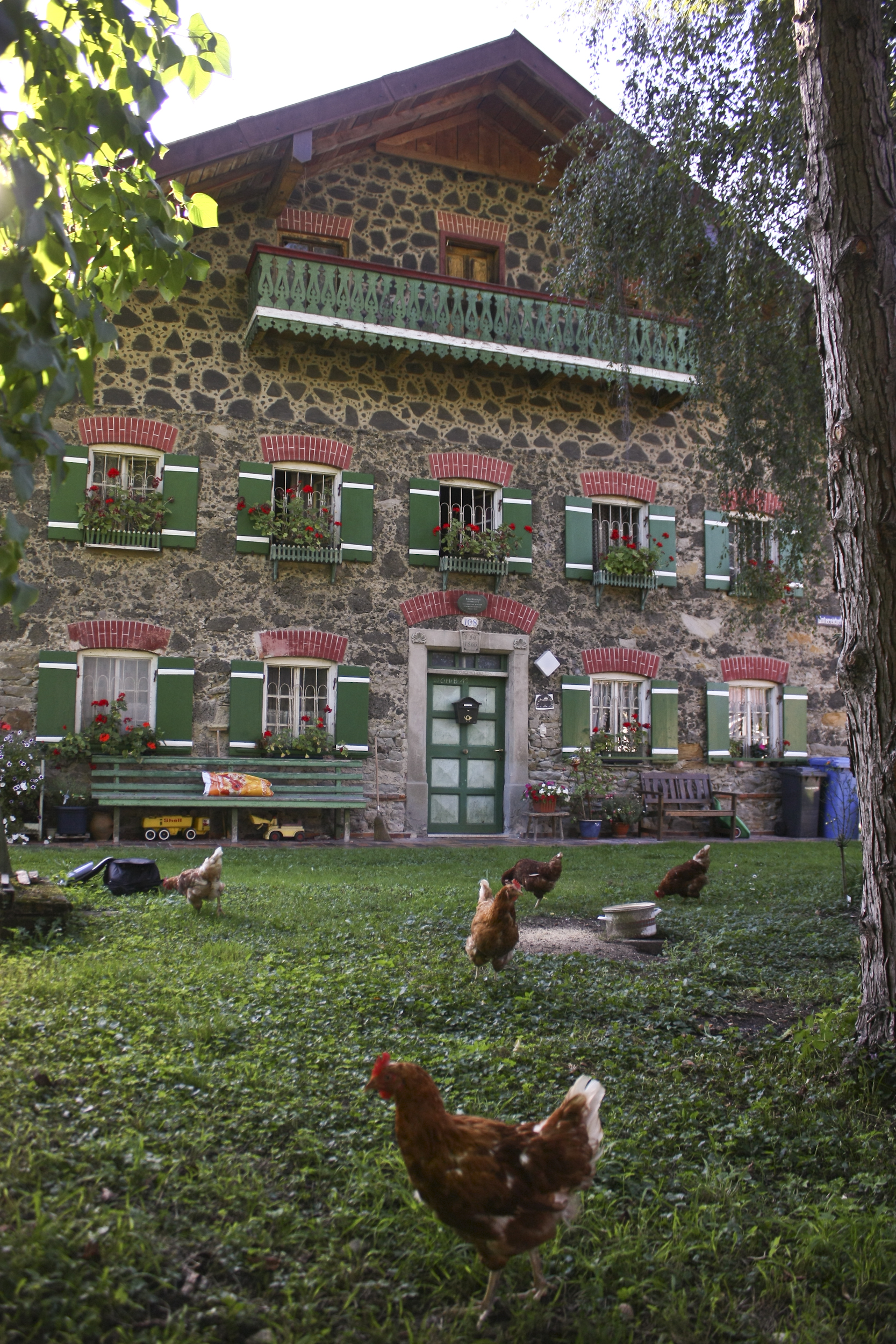
Untereichet

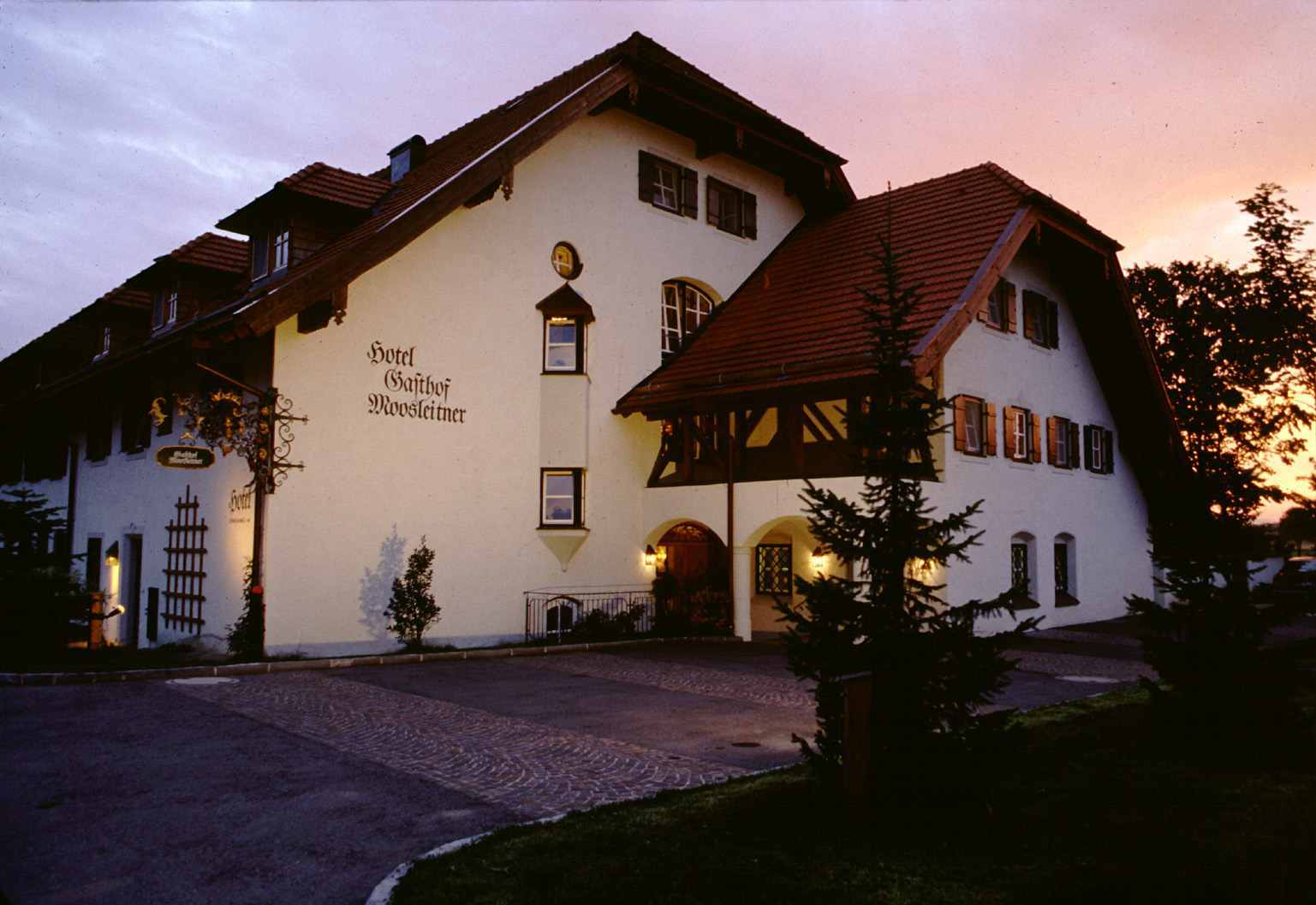
Hotel

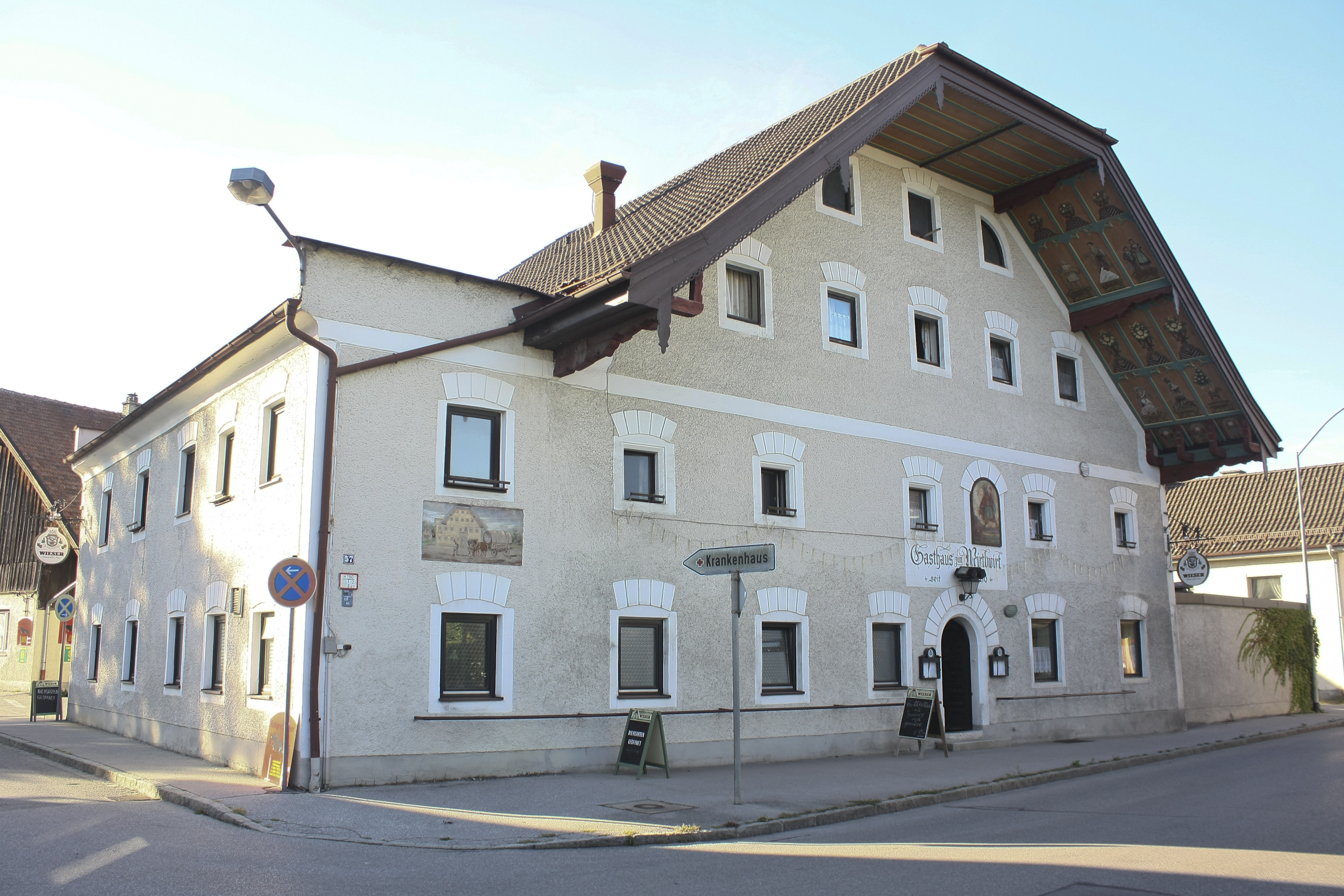
Gasthof

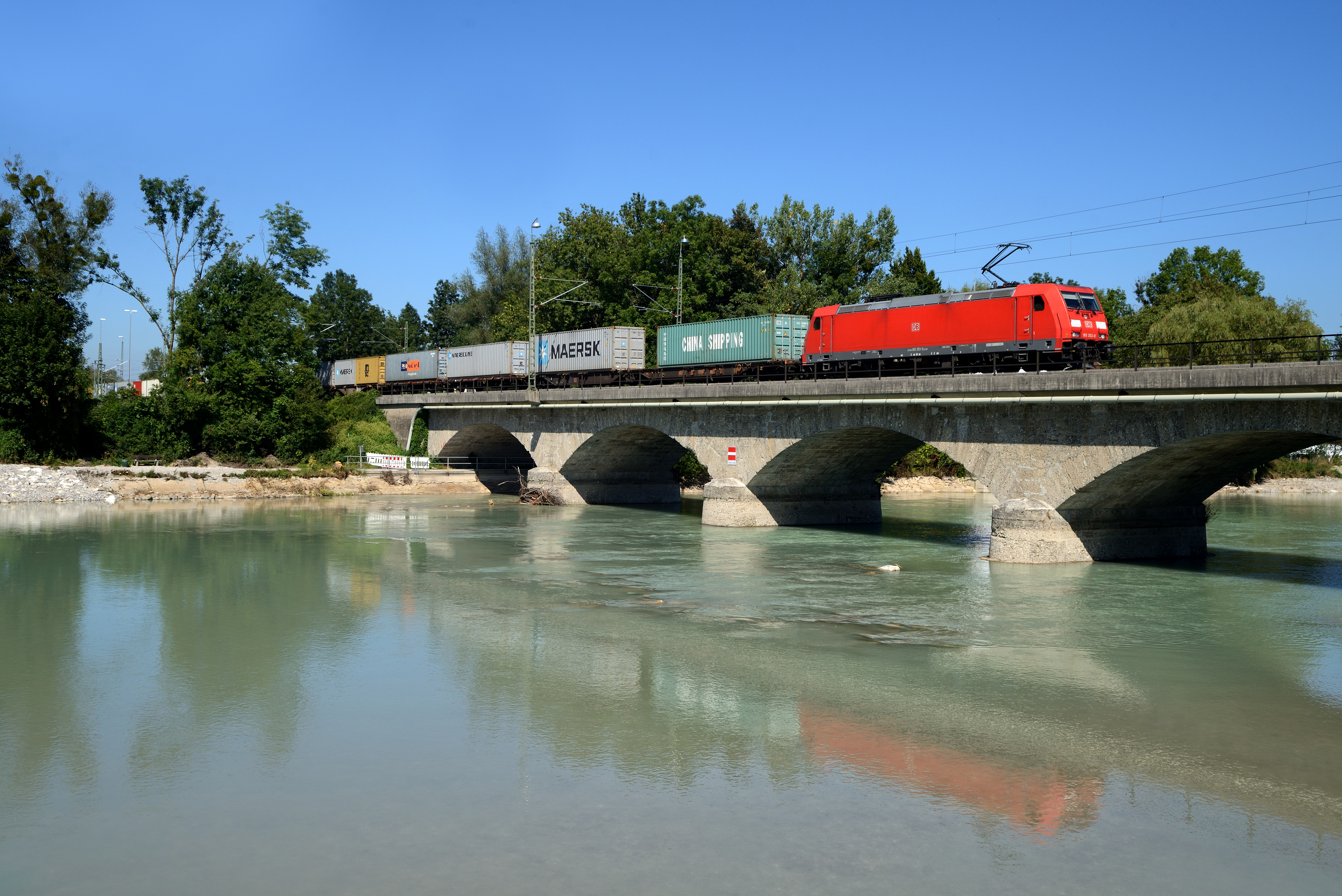
Railway bridge

== See also ==
- Freilassing, Geschichte einer jungen Stadt; Kurt Enzinger, Rupertus-Verlag 2003, ISBN 3-902317-01-9
