= Engelschalk II =

9th-century margrave of Pannonia

Engelschalk II was the margrave (comes terminalis, "frontier count") of the March of Pannonia in the late ninth century in opposition to Aribo. In his day, the march orientalis corresponded to a front along the Danube from the Traungau to the Savaria and Raba rivers and including the Vienna basin.

Engelschalk was the son of Engelschalk I and nephew of William II, sons of William I (the Wilhelminers). He led his brothers and cousins in rebellion against the new margrave Aribo when they were not accorded the succession to their fathers in 871. They displaced Aribo off and on until the Wilhelminer War of 882 – 884, when they were defeated by Aribo and Svatopluk of Moravia, aided by the emperor Charles the Fat. They fled to Arnulf of Carinthia, who refused to hand them over to Svatopluk. When Arnulf became king in 887, Engelschalk probably expected to receive his support, but Aribo was so strongly entrenched by then that the new king did not dare upset the balance.

Sometime before 893, Engelschalk captured Arnulf's illegitimate daughter Ellinrat and, probably, married her, in order to force Arnulf to accede to his demands. His plan failed and he had to flee to Moravia. In 893, Arnulf did regrant Engelschalk some power in Pannonia, but he offended the magnates of Bavaria and they conspired against him. In Regensburg that year, the aristocracy came together to negotiate with Engelschalk and prevent his assisting the Moravians, against whom Arnulf was planning a campaign for that year. Engelschalk was arrested and blinded without Arnulf's knowledge. His brother William immediately connived with Svatopluk, but the Bavarian aristocracy began to purge the court of Wilhelminers.

== Sources ==
- MacLean, Simon. Kingship and Politics in the Late Ninth Century: Charles the Fat and the end of the Carolingian Empire. Cambridge University Press: 2003.
- Reuter, Timothy. Germany in the Early Middle Ages 800–1056. New York: Longman, 1991.
