= Scharnitz Abbey =

Benedictine monastery in Mittenwald, Germany

Coordinates: 47.4819°N 11.2387°E

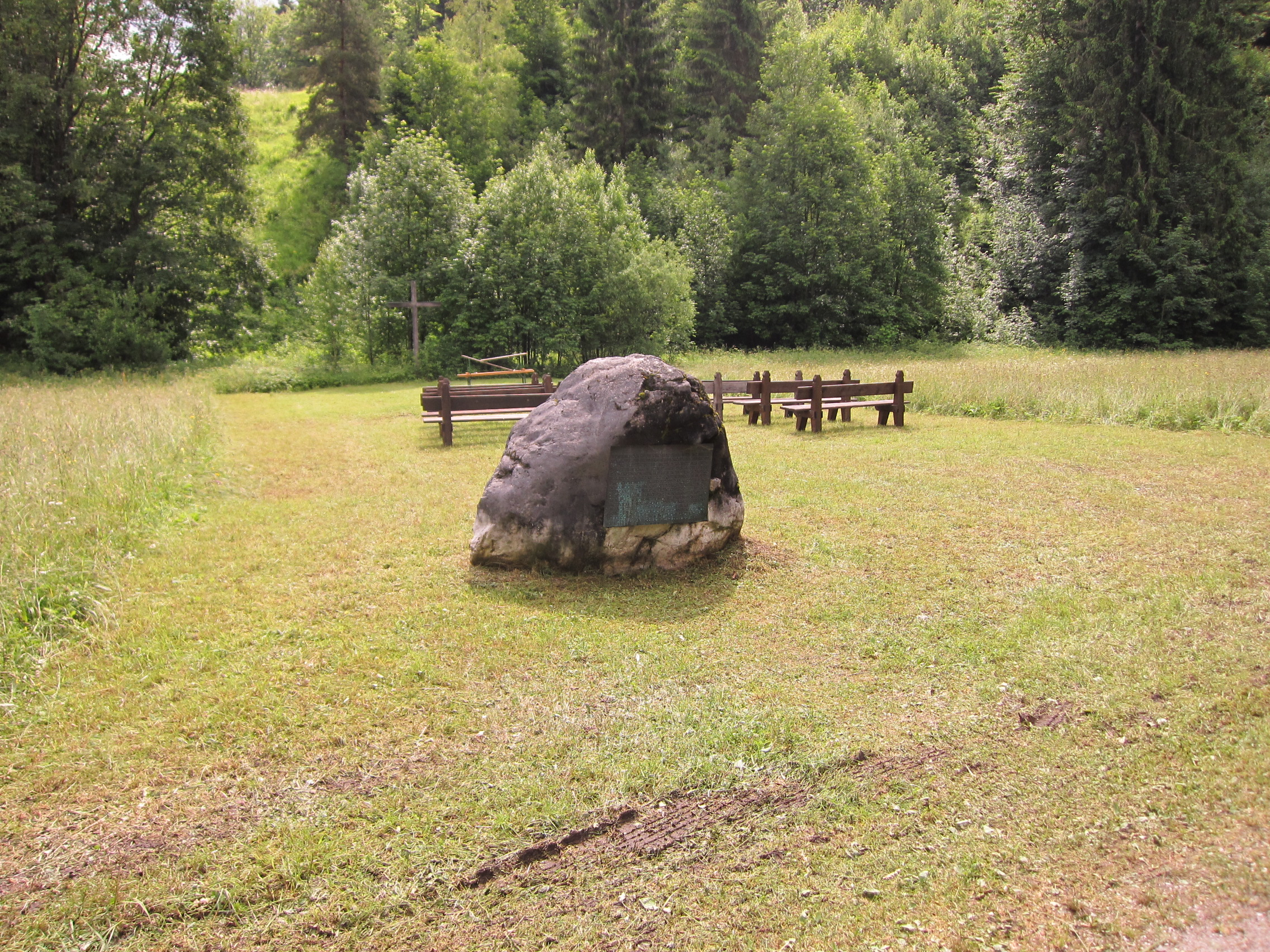
Former place of the Scharnitz monastery in Klais; seats here for an open-air service

Scharnitz Abbey (German: Kloster Scharnitz) was a Benedictine monastery in Mittenwald in Bavaria, Germany.

The monastery, dedicated to Saints Peter and Paul, was founded before 763 by Reginperht and Irminfried, believed to be members of the Bavarian noble family of the Huosi. Arbeo of Freising, a member of the same family, was its first abbot, until he was appointed Bishop of Freising in 764. Between 769 and 772, on his advice, the community was resettled to Schlehdorf Abbey on the Kochelsee, under abbot Atto, who is counted as the first abbot of Schlehdorf. The reasons for the move so soon after the foundation are not known.
