= William I of Traungau =

William I of Traungau (d. after 835) was count of Traungau, a county of the Eastern March, from 821 until his death.

== Life ==
=== Family ===
William was a member of the House of Traungau, who had possessions in Salzburggau, Isengau and Sundergau; he is considered the founder of the noble Bavarian Wilhelminers family. One of his ancestors may have been William, the founder of Rotthalmünster.

=== Count of Traungau ===
Louis I the Pious appointed him count, as the successor of his relative Gramann. In addition to his possessions in Traungau, he acquired assets in present-day Lower Austria. As count, William was subjected to the authority of the margraves of the Eastern March. In particular, he was subordinate to Gotafrid, to Gerold and finally to Radbod. With the Ordinatio Imperii of 817, Louis II the German became king of Bavaria and immediately began to build his ties within the Bavarian aristocracy by assigning prestigious positions to his supporters. Despite these internal upheavals at the Bavarian court, William maintained his position for the following years, resisting even in the years marked by the internal wars of the Carolingian dynasty, which ended only with the Treaty of Verdun in 843.

In 826 he donated a part of his lands around Linz to the Mondsee Abbey, while in 833, 834 and 853 he made a series of donations of goods to the Saint Emmeram's Abbey in Regensburg. These donations included, respectively, some goods from Linz and Wels, some localities around the Perschling, the possession of Rosdorf on the Danube along with an area between the Aist and Naarn rivers. William is also remembered for being one of the main colonizers of southeastern Germany in the first half of the 9th century.

== Marriage and children ==
His wife was Engilrat, of the house of Adaluncs von Roning, one of the most illustrious families in Bavaria. By her he had at least three children:

- William;
- Engelschalk;
- Adalbert.

Among his grandsons we must remember the count Megingoz I of Worms. After his death, William II and Engelschalk I inherited the Traungau and expanded the area under their control to the entire Eastern March, which they received from Louis the German.
