= Asten, Austria =

Asten
- Municipality
- Coat of arms

- Location within Austria
- Coordinates: 48°13′0″N 14°25′0″E
- Country: Austria
- State: Upper Austria
- District: Linz-Land

Government
  - Mayor: Alma Halilović (SPÖ)

Area
  - Total: 8.48 km^{2} (3.27 sq mi)
- Elevation: 255 m (837 ft)

Population (2018-01-01)
  - Total: 6,613
  - Density: 780/km^{2} (2,020/sq mi)
- Time zone: UTC+1 (CET)
  - Summer (DST): UTC+2 (CEST)
- Postal code: 4481
- Area code: 07224
- Vehicle registration: LL
- Website: https://www.asten.ooe.gv.at

Asten is a municipality in the district Linz-Land in the Austrian state of Upper Austria.

== Population ==
Historical population
Year	Pop.	±%
1869	611	—
1880	660	+8.0%
1890	558	−15.5%
1900	545	−2.3%
1910	544	−0.2%
1923	560	+2.9%
1934	623	+11.3%
1939	611	−1.9%
1951	1,547	+153.2%
1961	1,910	+23.5%
1971	1,970	+3.1%
1981	3,431	+74.2%
1991	5,147	+50.0%
2001	6,025	+17.1%
2011	6,220	+3.2%

== See also ==
- Raffelstetten Customs Regulations
