= Sauwald =

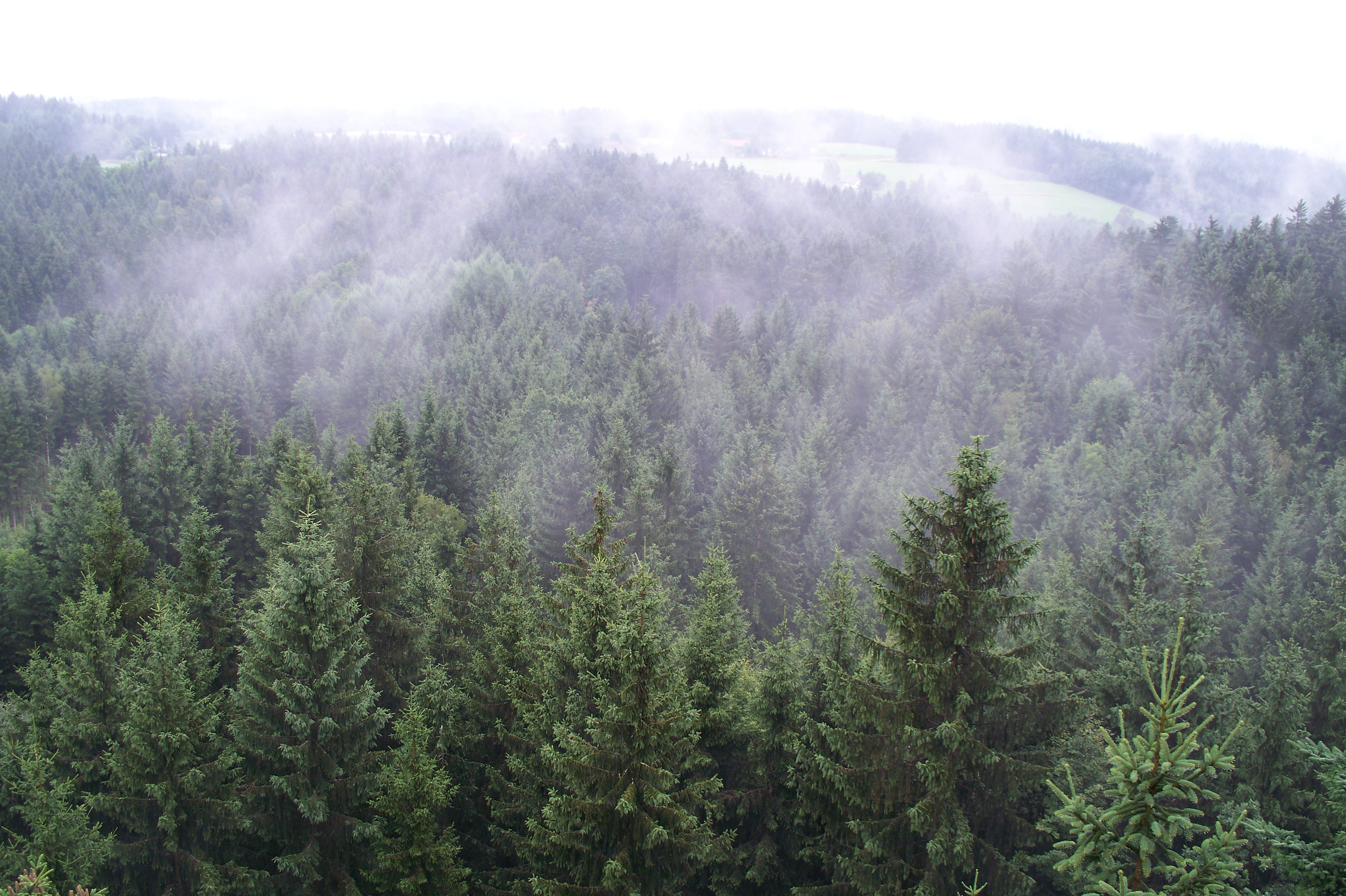
- Mist rising from the Sauwald near Kopfing

Highest point
- Peak: Haugstein
- Elevation: 895 m (2,936 ft)

Dimensions
- Length: 40 km (25 mi)
- Area: 460 km^{2} (180 mi^{2})

Geography
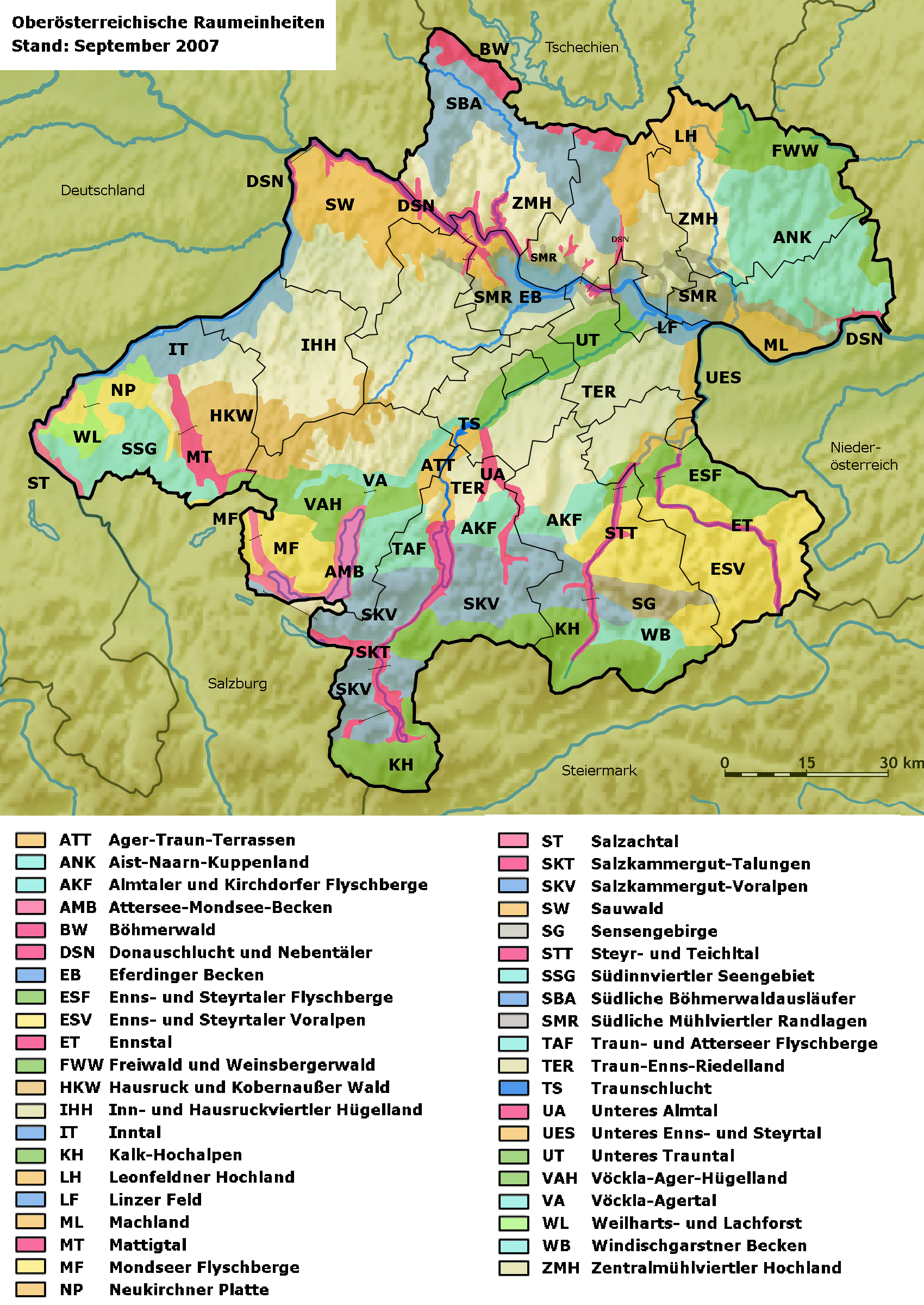
- Upper Austrian regions
- State(s): Districts of Schärding, Grieskirchen, Eferding (Innviertel); Upper Austria
- Range coordinates: 48°30′32.5″N 13°40′12.9″E
- Parent range: Granite and Gneiss Highland, Bohemian Massif

Geology
- Rock type(s): Granite, covered by a marl platform in places

The Sauwald in Upper Austria is the largest part of the Bohemian Massif lying south of the Danube. Its plateau runs from Passau and Schärding on the Inn to Eferding.

== Origin of the name: Passau Forest ==
Folk etymologically the name is believed to have derived from the (formally native) wild boar, but the term is more probably an abbreviation of its old name, Passauer Wald ("Passau Forest"). The whole region was always closely linked to the Bishopric of Passau and the town of Passau.
