= Aribo of Austria =

Aribo (or Arbo; c. 850 – after 909) was margrave (comes terminalis, "frontier count") of the Carolingian March of Pannonia from 871 until his death. He is recognised as a progenitor of the Aribonid dynasty.

In his day, the Pannonian march, also called marcha orientalis, corresponded to a front along the Danube river from the Bavarian Traungau up to Savaria (Szombathely) and the Rába river, including the Vienna Basin. Aribo was originally appointed by the East Frankish king Louis the German to succeed the Wilhelminer brothers William and Engelschalk I, after they died on campaign against the forces of the Great Moravian realm. This has been used to support the hypothesis that he was a brother-in-law of the two margraves.

Aribo maintained peace with Prince Svatopluk of Moravia and it paid off when, in 882, the sons of the late margraves Engelschalk I and William, led by Engelschalk II, rebelled against him, claiming their rights to the march. The Carolingian emperor Charles the Fat confirmed Aribo's position and Engelschalk II turned to Arnulf of Carinthia, Aribo's southern neighbour, for support. Svatopluk, however, entered the Wilhelminer War on the side of Aribo and the emperor. In 884, peace returned to the marcha.

A sign of Aribo's strength after this was that he was unable to be unseated by Arnulf when the latter succeeded as King of East Francia in 887. In 893, Arnulf appointed Engelschalk II to a portion of the Pannonian march over Aribo's head. Aribo never reconciled with Arnulf after the Wilhelimner War and his contacts with the Moravians were kept secure. After his falling out, his son Isanrich got Moravian support against Arnulf. Around 905, Margrave Aribo issued a customs code concerning the trade along the Danube river at Raffelstetten. He survived the disastrous Battle of Pressburg, whereafter most of the margravial territory was lost. He last appeared in a 909 deed, when he and Archbishop Pilgrim of Salzburg were vested with Altmünster Abbey by King Louis the Child.

Aribo allegedly died hunting wisents. His descendants of the Aribonid family rose to the most powerful Bavarian dynasties. They held the Archbishopric of Salzburg and the office of a Bavarian count palatine in the 10th century, but eventually were pushed out of power in the Duchy of Bavaria by the Liutpoldings.

== Sources ==
- Reuter, Timothy. Germany in the Early Middle Ages 800–1056. New York: Longman, 1991.
- MacLean, Simon. Kingship and Politics in the Late Ninth Century: Charles the Fat and the end of the Carolingian Empire. Cambridge University Press: 2003.
