= Schlehdorf Abbey =

Coordinates: 47°39′28″N 11°19′05″E

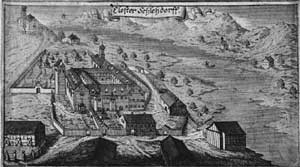
Engraving of the abbey from the "Churbaierische Atlas" of Anton Wilhelm Ertl, 1687

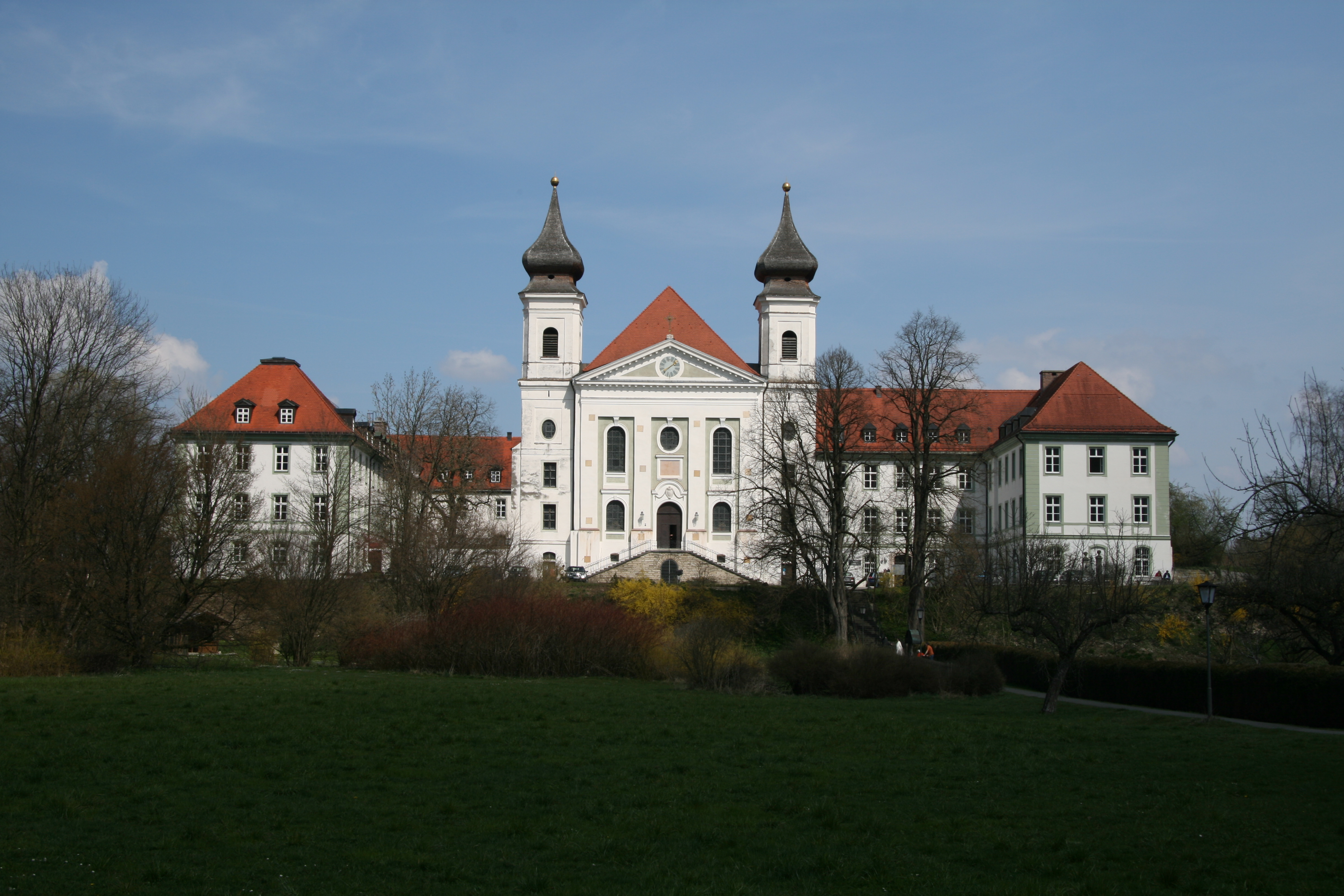
View of the abbey

Schlehdorf Abbey (German: Kloster Schlehdorf) was originally a Benedictine monastery, later an Augustinian monastery, and is today a Dominican convent. It is located at Schlehdorf, at the extreme northern edge of the Bavarian Alps on the Kochelsee south of Munich, Germany.

== History ==
The abbey, dedicated to Saints Dionysius and Tertullinus, was founded around perhaps 740 from the nearby Benediktbeuern Abbey. In 769 it was resettled by monks from the abandoned Scharnitz Abbey. The first abbot, Atto, brought with him the relics of Saint Tertullinus. It was a Benedictine monastery until the 9th century, after which it is heard of no more; presumably it was destroyed during the Hungarian invasions. From 1140 it was revived as a house of the Augustinian Canons. In 1803 it was dissolved during the secularisation of Bavaria, and sold off.

Since 1904 Schlehdorf has belonged to the Missionary Dominican Sisters of King William's Town. It has been the seat of the German Province of the Order since 1960, and as of 2010 is a community of about 60 Dominican sisters. In the abbey grounds, besides a guesthouse and the abbey shop, is a girls' secondary school (Realschule) of the diocese of Munich and Freising.
