= Pilgersdorf =

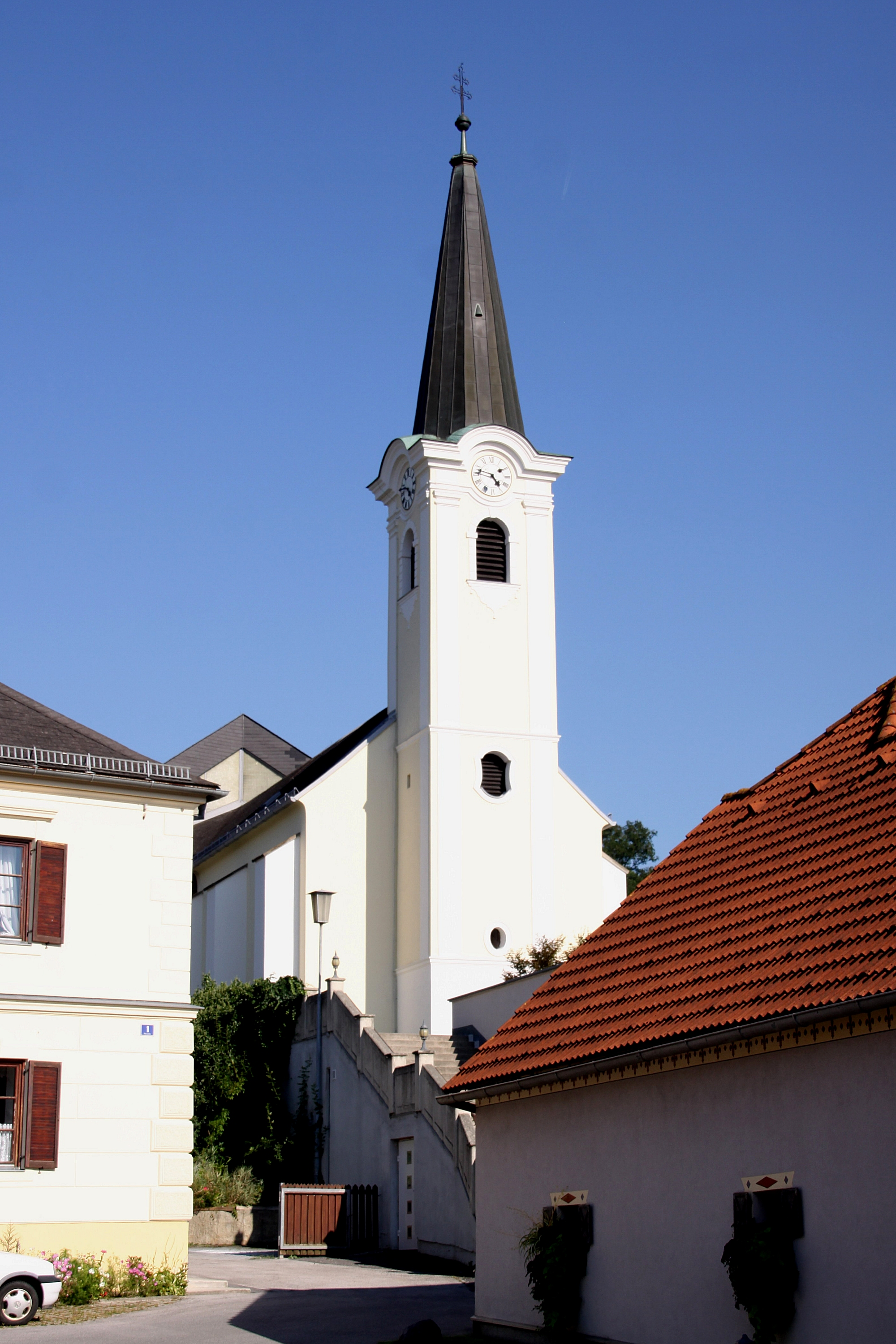
- Saint Giles Church

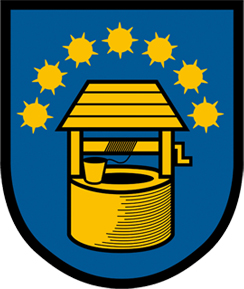
- Coat of arms

- Location within Austria
- Coordinates: 47°26′N 16°21′E
- Country: Austria
- State: Burgenland
- District: Oberpullendorf

Government
  - Mayor: Ewald Bürger (ÖVP)

Area
  - Total: 43.9 km^{2} (16.9 sq mi)
- Elevation: 375 m (1,230 ft)

Population (2018-01-01)
  - Total: 1,656
  - Density: 37.7/km^{2} (97.7/sq mi)
- Time zone: UTC+1 (CET)
  - Summer (DST): UTC+2 (CEST)
- Postal code: 7441
- Website: www.pilgersdorf.at

Pilgersdorf (Croatian: Pilištrof, Hungarian: Pörgölény) is a town in the district of Oberpullendorf in the Austrian state of Burgenland.

== Geography ==
The town is located in Middle Burgenland in the Zöbern valley, between Kirchschlag in der Buckligen Welt and Lockenhaus. It is the amalgamation of the communities of Bubendorf, Deutsch Gerisdorf, Kogl, Lebenbrunn, Pilgersdorf, Salmannsdorf and Steinbach.

== Population ==
Historical population
Year	Pop.	±%
1869	2,333	—
1880	2,281	−2.2%
1890	2,131	−6.6%
1900	2,139	+0.4%
1910	2,123	−0.7%
1923	2,090	−1.6%
1934	2,099	+0.4%
1939	1,994	−5.0%
1951	1,873	−6.1%
1961	1,834	−2.1%
1971	1,837	+0.2%
1981	1,781	−3.0%
1991	1,713	−3.8%
2001	1,702	−0.6%
2011	1,642	−3.5%
