= Engelschalk I =

Engelschalk I was the margrave (comes terminalis, "frontier count") of the March of Pannonia in the mid ninth century until his death on a campaign against the Moravians in 871. In his day, the march orientalis corresponded to a front along the Danube from the Traungau to the Savaria and Raba rivers, including the Vienna basin. It was a military frontier zone against Great Moravia.

Engelschalk co-ruled the march with his brother William and both died on the same campaign. They were replaced by Aribo, but Engelschalk's son Engelschalk II led their heirs in rebellion against Aribo in what became known as the Wilhelminer War from 882 to 884. The "Wilhelminers" were descendants of Engelschalk's father, William I.

== Sources ==
- MacLean, Simon. Kingship and Politics in the Late Ninth Century: Charles the Fat and the end of the Carolingian Empire. Cambridge University Press: 2003.
