= William (March of Pannonia) =

German margave

William (II) was the margrave (comes terminalis, "frontier count") of the March of Pannonia in the mid ninth century until his death on campaign against the Moravians in 871. In his day, the march orientalis corresponded to a front along the Danube from the Traungau to Savaria and the Rába river and including the Vienna basin. It was a military frontier zone against Avaria.

William co-ruled the march with his brother Engelschalk I and both died on the same campaign. They were replaced by Aribo, but Engelschalk's son Engelschalk II led their heirs in rebellion against Aribo in what became known as the Wilhelminer War from 882 to 884. The "Wilhelminers" were descendants of William's father, William I.

== Sources ==
- MacLean, Simon. Kingship and Politics in the Late Ninth Century: Charles the Fat and the end of the Carolingian Empire. Cambridge University Press: 2003.
