= March of Pannonia =

Frontier territory of the Carolingian Empire

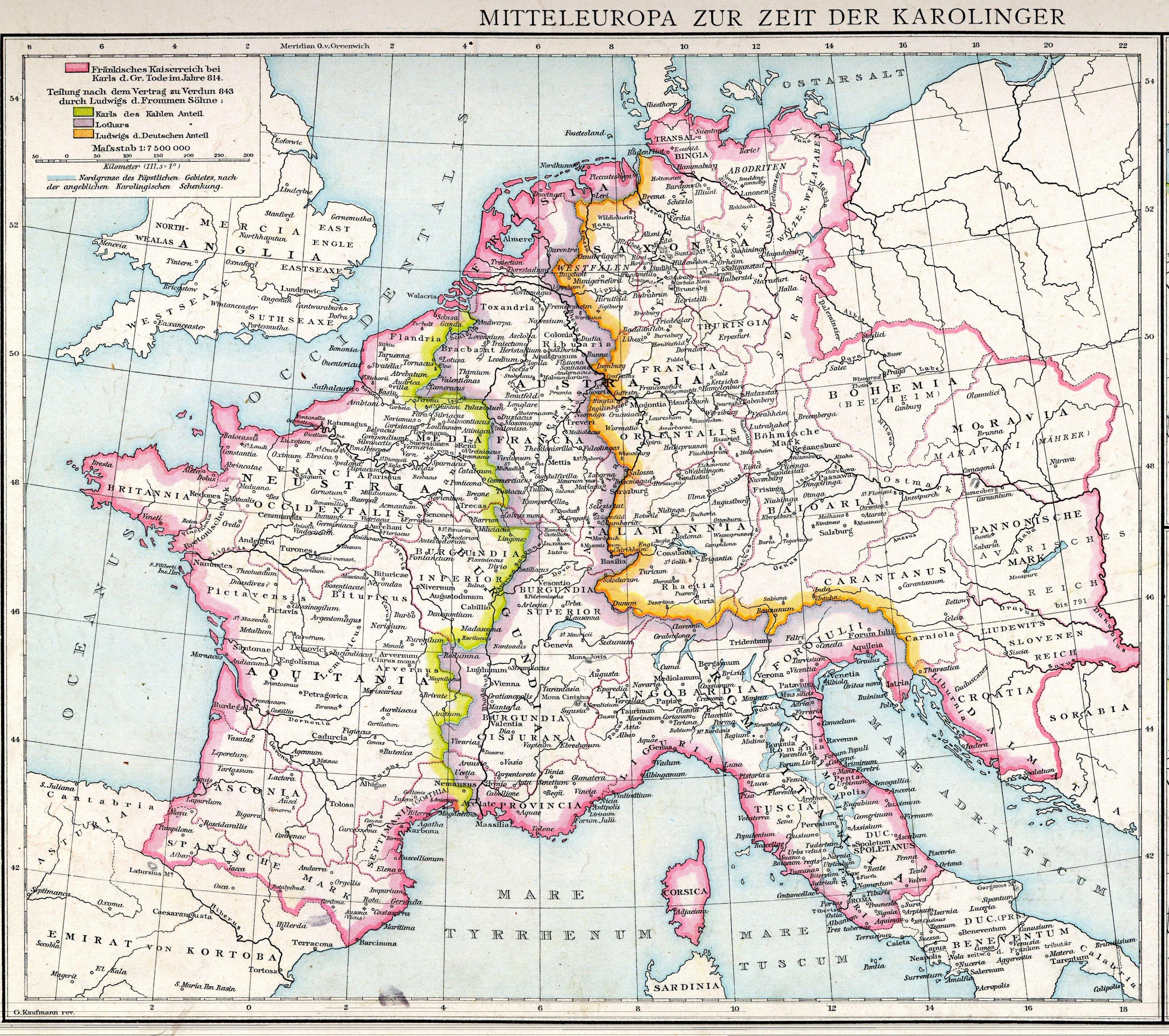
Map of the Carolingian Empire showing the location of the Pannonian March

The March of Pannonia or Eastern March (Latin: marcha orientalis) was a frontier march of the Carolingian Empire, named after the former Roman province of Pannonia and carved out of the preceding and larger Avar March.

It was referred to in some documents as terminum regni Baioariorum in Oriente or "the end of the kingdom of the Bavarians in the east", and from this is sometimes called the Bavarian Eastern March of the wider Bavarian eastern marches, a term used for any such territory, though today most commonly used to refer to the later Margraviate of Austria, established in 976 as a sort of late successor state.

It was erected in the mid-ninth century in the lands of the former Avar Khaganate against the threat of Great Moravia and lasted only as long as the strength of that state. The East Frankish rulers appointed margraves (prefects) to govern the march.

== History ==
Charlemagne, temporarily allied with Khan Kardam of Bulgaria, from 791 onwards had launched several military campaigns against the Avars and had established the Avar March (Avaria) on the southeastern frontier of his realm, ruled by his brother-in-law Prefect Gerold of Bavaria. When the Avar Khaganate finally collapsed in 804, Emperor Charlemagne re-arranged Avaria and split it into the following parts:

- The eastern part of the former Khaganate between the Danube and Tisza Rivers was occupied by the Bulgars.
- The Avar March, or subsequently the Pannonian March, was in turn differentiated within with the following regions:
  - Lower Pannonia, between the Drava and Sava rivers (present-day Slavonia and western Vojvodina). These regions were inhabited by the Slavs of Lower Pannonia, and history records several semi-autonomous dukes, some seated at Sisak, as vassals of the Frankish Dukes of Friuli. Some were seated at Mosapurc, and had connections to Slavs to the north, and the state of Great Moravia. From 819 Lower Pannonia was the site of a rebellion led by Duke Ljudevit Posavski against the rule of Duke Cadolah of Friuli and his successor Baldric. King Louis the German had the Slavic Duchy of Lower Pannonia established in 839, ruled by Nitravan (Slovak) opponent Prince Pribina with his residence at Zalavár on Lake Balaton.
  - Upper Pannonia, stretching from the Enns River and the Vienna Woods in the north down to the Drava River in the south (today located in western Hungary and eastern Austria).

In 817, Emperor Louis the Pious granted Bavaria with Avaria to his minor son Louis the German, therefore expanding the Bavarian eastern march, from its first eastern marches the Traungau and Carantania, over the Avarian March, thereafter sharing the name Pannonian March.

By resolution of an 828 Imperial Diet, Baldric of Friuli was deposed and the March of Pannonia was set apart as a frontier march against Moravia within the Frankish regnum of Bavaria. The Bavarian prefects had to face the rising threat by the Moravian ruler Mojmir I, who pursued separatist policies in the Eastern March. This march, already called marcha orientalis, corresponded at its core to a frontier along the Danube, from the Traungau and the former Slavic principality of Carantania to Savaria and the Rába River including the Vienna Basin. By the 843 Treaty of Verdun, the Pannonian March together with Bavaria became part of Louis' kingdom of East Francia. Meanwhile, the Moravian threat continued; in 854 Prefect Radbod was even accused of having forged an alliance with Mojmir's successor Prince Rastislav and deposed.

Two years later, King Louis ceded the march directly to his son Carloman of Bavaria, who had the fortifications of Herzogenburg and Wilhelmsburg erected along the Traisen River by the Wilhelminer margraves William and Engelschalk I. Likewise, the castle of Tulln on the Danube is documented in 859. In 871 William and Engelschalk died in battle against the Moravians, whereafter Carloman vested their rival Aribo of Austria with Upper Pannonia. When his father Louis died in 876, Carloman succeeded him as East Frankish king and gave Lower Pannonia to his son Arnulf of Carinthia. From 882, the rule was enfeebled by the Wilhelminer War of Margrave Engelschalk II against the Aribonids, whereafter Prince Svatopluk I of Moravia took the occasion to invade the Pannonian lands. In 893 Arnulf, East Frankish king since 887, installed Margrave Luitpold.

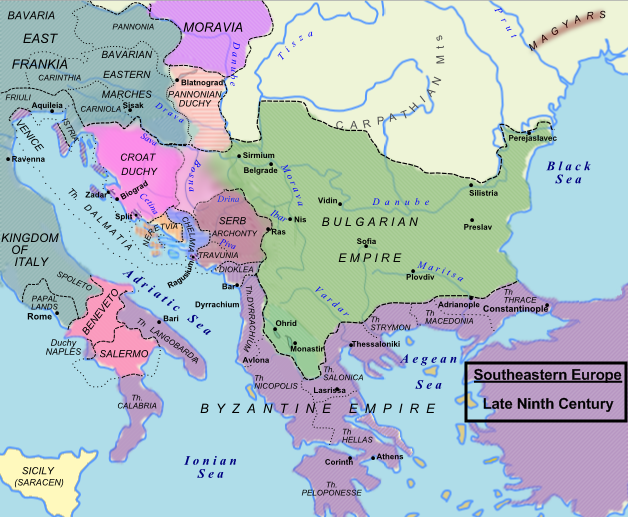
The march in 850

By the 890s, the Pannonian March seems to have disappeared, along with the threat from Great Moravia, during the Hungarian invasions of Europe. Upon the defeat of Margrave Luitpold at the 907 Battle of Pressburg, all East Frankish lands beyond the Enns river were lost.

== Margraves ==
- Radbod, prefect or margrave of the Eastern March or Pannonia, 833–854
- Carloman of Bavaria, from 856
  - William, until 871, jointly with his brother
  - Engelschalk I, until 871
- Aribo, 871–909
  - Engelschalk II, son of Engelschalk I, in opposition to Aribo until 893
  - Luitpold, 893–907

== Sources ==
- Reuter, Timothy. Germany in the Early Middle Ages 800–1056. New York: Longman, 1991.

.
