= List of people from Moravia =

Notable people from Moravia include:

== A ==
- Karel Abraham (1990–), motorcycle racer

== B ==
- Tomáš Baťa (1876–1932), entrepreneur, founder of Bata Shoes company
- Thomas J. Bata (1914–2008), entrepreneur, son of Tomáš Baťa and former head of the Bata shoe company
- Otakar Borůvka (1899–1995), mathematician, publisher of Borůvka's algorithm
- Zdeněk Burian (1905–1981), painter, book illustrator, paleontology reconstructor

== D ==
- Miroslav Donutil (1951–), actor

== E ==
- Heinrich Wilhelm Ernst (1814–1865), violinist

== F ==
- Emil Filla (1882–1930), painter
- Rudolf Firkušný (1912–1994), pianist
- Sigmund Freud (1856–1939), father of psychoanalysis
- Bohuslav Fuchs (1895–1972), modernist architect

== G ==
- Anna Rosina Gambold (1762–1821), missionary and diarist
- Kurt Gödel (1906–1978), theoretical mathematician

== H ==
- Hugo Haas (1901–1968), film actor, director and writer
- Anton Hanak (1875–1934), sculptor
- Stefan von Haschenperg, (floruit 1540s), military engineer in England
- Dagmar Havlová (1953–), actress and former First Lady of the Czech Republic (1997–2003)
- Josef Hoffmann (1870–1956), architect
- Bohumil Hrabal (1914–1997), writer
- Edmund Husserl (1859–1938), philosopher

== I ==
- Markéta Irglová (1988–), songwriter, musician, singer

== J ==
- Leoš Janáček (1854–1928), composer
- Maria Jeritza (1887–1982), soprano
- Jobst of Moravia (Jodok of Luxemburg) (1351–1411), King of the Romans (antiking), margrave of Moravia

== K ==
- Georg Joseph Kamel (1661–1701), botanist, Jesuit missionary
- Jan Keller (1955–), sociologist
- Antonín Kohout (1919–2013), cellist, member of the Smetana Quartet
- Luboš Kohoutek (1935–), astronomer
- John Amos Comenius (1592–1670), educator and theologian
- Erich Wolfgang Korngold (1897–1957), film music composer
- Leon Koudelak (1961–), guitarist
- Magdalena Kožená (1973–), mezzo-soprano
- Karel Kryl (1944–1994), popular musician and songwriter, critic of the communism in Czechoslovakia
- Ernst Křenek (1900–1991), composer
- Otakar Kubín (1883–1969), avant-garde painter
- Milan Kundera (1929–2023), writer

== L ==
- Ivan Lendl (1960–), tennis player
- Adolf Loos (1870–1933), architect, author of essay Ornament and Crime

== M ==
- Ernst Mach (1838–1916), physicist and philosopher
- Tomáš Garrigue Masaryk (1850–1937), philosopher and politician, first president of Czechoslovakia
- Christian Mayer (1719–1783), astronomer
- Jan Milíč z Kroměříže, religious reformer
- Mojmir I of Moravia, first known ruler
- Mojmir II of Moravia, last known ruler
- Alfons Mucha (1860–1939), painter
- Vladimír Menšík (1929–1988), popular actor and entertainer

== P ==
- František Palacký (1798–1876), historian and politician
- Franz Petrasch (1744–1820) general officer in the Habsburg military
- Anton Pilgram (1450–1516), architect, sculptor and woodcarver
- George Placzek (1905–1955), physicist, participant in Manhattan Project
- Bolek Polívka (1949–), actor, mime, playwright and screenwriter
- Georg Prochaska (1749–1820), ophthalmologist and physiologist

== R ==
- King Rastislav of Moravia
- Karl Renner (1870–1950), politician, co-founder of Friends of Nature movement

== S ==
- Emilie Schindler (1907–2001), Sudeten German humanitarian, wife of Oskar Schindler
- Oskar Schindler (1908–1974), Sudeten German entrepreneur, known for saving the lives of almost 1,200 Jews during WWII
- Joseph Schumpeter (1883–1950), economist and political scientist
- Peter Sís (1949–), illustrator, animator and writer
- Jan Skácel (1922–1989), poet
- Duke Slavomir of Moravia, leader of Moravia around 871
- Leo Slezak (1873–1946), operatic tenor
- John Sobieslaw of Moravia (1352–1394), Patriarch of Aquileia
- Františka Stránecká (1839–1888), writer and folklore collector
- Tom Stoppard (1937–), British playwright
- King Svatopluk I of Moravia (c. 840–894), ruler of Great Moravia
- Svatopluk II (c. 884–906), Moravian prince of Nitra
- Ludvík Svoboda (1895–1979), General of I Czechoslovak Army Corps, seventh president of Czechoslovakia
- Jan Syrový (1888–1970), general, politician

== T ==
- Anna Ticho (1894–1980), Israeli artist
- Miroslav Tichý (1926–2011), photographer
- Pavel Tichý (1936–1994), logician, philosopher
- František Tomášek (1899–1992), Archbishop of Prague
- Ivana Trump (1949–2022), fashion model, TV presenter
- Ernst Tugendhat (1930–2023), German philosopher

== V ==
- Pavel Vranický (1756–1808), classical composer

== W ==
- Jan Eskymo Welzl (1868–1948), globetrotter and gold-digger, chief of the Siberian Yupik peoples
- Otto Wichterle (1913–1998), chemist, inventor of contact lenses
- Zdeňka Wiedermannová-Motyčkova (1868–1915), women's education and women's rights activist

== Z ==
- Emil Zátopek (1922–2000), long-distance runner, 4 times Olympic winner
