= Moymirid dynasty =

Moravian rulers of 9th–10th centuries

The Moymirid dynasty (Latin: Moimarii, Czech and Slovak: Mojmírovci) was a Moravian ruling dynasty that ruled over Moravia in the 9th and early 10th century. On one hand, it is named after the first known member, Mojmir I, but on the other hand the Latin form of the dynasty's name is first mentioned in a letter from the year 900.

The last known members presumably died in the first decade of the 10th century during one of the invasions of Hungarian tribes. The developments of the family before Mojmír I and after 906 are unknown.

== Known members ==
Ruler	Title	Reign	Notes
Mojmir I	Duke	820s–846	First known Moravian ruler and probable founder of the Dynasty
Rastislav	Duke	846–870	Nephew of Mojmír I
Svatopluk I	Duke (King?)	870–894	Nephew of Rastislav
Slavomír	Duke	871	Relative of Svatopluk I
Mojmir II	Duke	894–after 901	Son of Svatopluk I
Svatopluk II	Prince	894–899	Son of Svatopluk I

== Disputed members ==
- Pribina
- Predslav
