= Predslav =

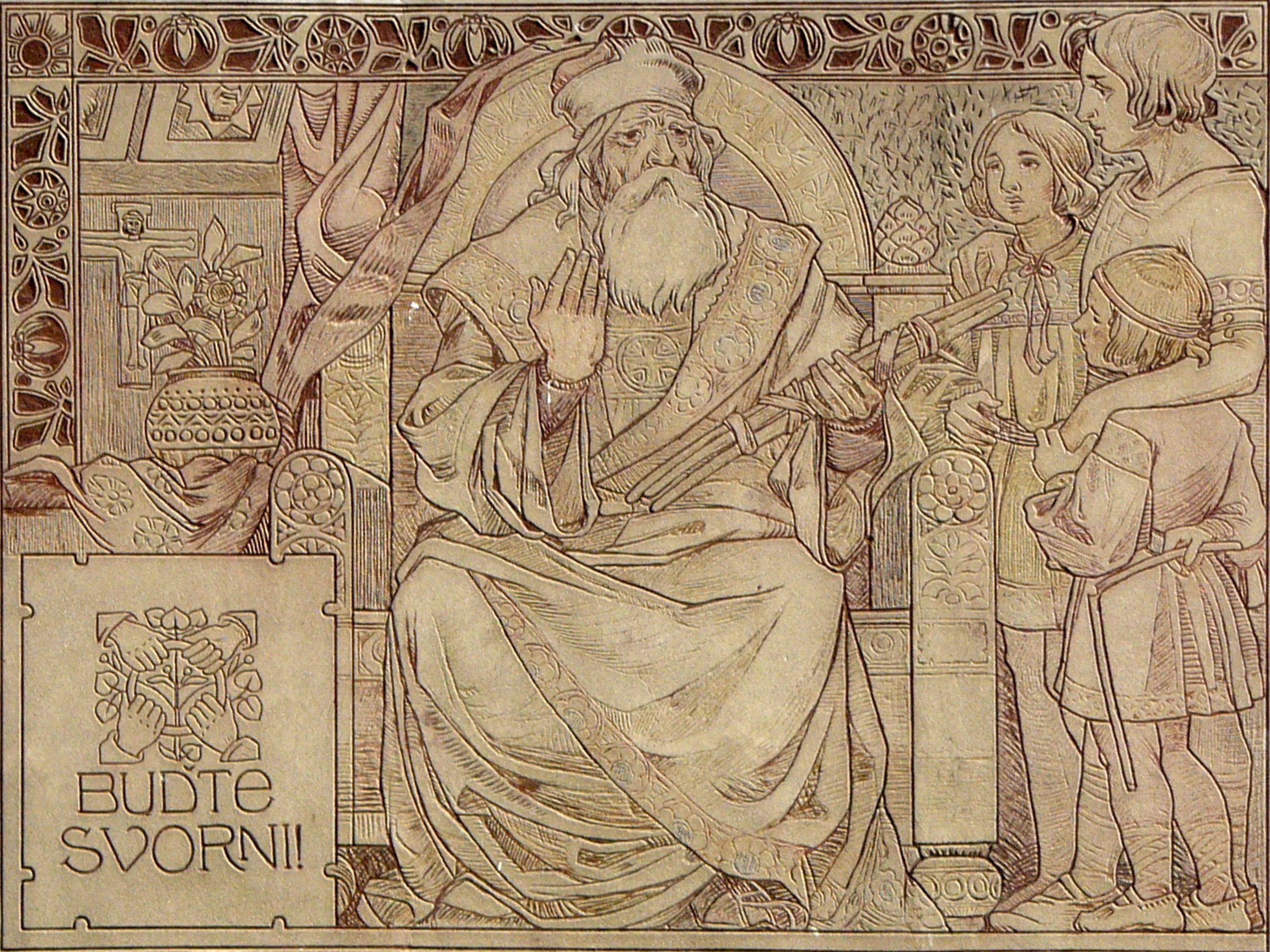
Modern sketch depicting a scene from the legend of Svatopluk's twigs showing the king and his three sons

Predslav (Latin: Predeslaus, born around 850) is an almost unknown son of Svatopluk, the most important ruler of Moravia (870–894).

Generally, two sons of Svatopluk are known: Mojmír II and Svatopluk II. However, the famous legend of Svatopluk's twigs, written by the Byzantine emperor Constantine Porphyrogenitos around the 10th century, mentions three sons. It is supposed that the name of the third son could be Predslav (Predslaus). This name is mentioned in the list of pilgrims scribbled in the 9th century on the margins of a Gospel book in Cividale del Friuli, together with the names of Svatopluk (Szuentiepulc) and his wife (Szuentezizna).

Daniel Rapant suggested that Predslav's name may have given the name to the Slovak capital: i.e., Bratislava (Preslava Civitas).

== Sources ==
- Dvořák P. Prvá kniha o Bratislave, Banská Bystrica, 2006
- Rapant D. Traja synovia Svatoplukovi. Elan 10, 10/1939-1940, pp. 2–4
