= Juraj Sklenár =

Slovak historian

- Born: 28 February 1745; Tiba near Levoča, Kingdom of Hungary, Habsburg monarchy (now Slovakia)
- Died: 31 January 1790 (aged 45); Pressburg, Kingdom of Hungary, Habsburg monarchy (now Bratislava, Slovakia)
- Occupation(s): historian, pedagogue

Juraj Sklenár (Georgius Szklenár; 25 February 1745 – 30 January 1790) was a Slovak historian, pedagogue and Catholic priest.

== Life ==
He was born in Tiba, a manor-house near Levoča. Sklenár entered the Jesuits as a novice in 1764 and become a doctor of philosophy. He worked in Levoča, Trnava, Prešov and Košice. After the abolition of the Jesuit order, he worked as a professor of rhetoric and deputy director at main royal grammar school in Pressburg (today's Bratislava). A part of Sklenár's works are Latin odes and occasional speeches related to his pedagogic position. In the 1770s, he already become more known among scientists. In the Geographic Lexicon of the Kingdom of Hungary (1876) he is mentioned as the pride of Pressburg. Sklenár, together with Juraj Papánek, Juraj Fándly and Samuel Timon created the first scientific works about the earliest history of Slovaks. Slovak enlightenment historians already paid attention to Great Moravia and the mission of Saints Cyril and Methodius, but did not adopt yet a deciding position. In 1784, Sklenár published his most important work Vetustissimus magnae Moraviae situs et primus in eam Hungarorum ingressus et incursus, geographice, historice, critice descriptus. He tried to separate the history of Great Moravia from the Slovak history and proposed the location of its center to Sremska Mitrovica. According to Richard Marsina, regardless of this mistake, Sklenár belonged among most qualified and most critical historians of Bernolák's generations.

== Works ==
- Synchronisticon Josepho e com. Battyány S. R. I. principi et primato Hungariae
- Raroria naturae monumenta in Ungaria occurentia
- Origo er genealogia Illustris Battyaniorum Gentis
- Vetustissimus magnae Moraviae situs et primus in eam Hungarorum ingressus et incursus, geographice, historice, critice descriptus
- Hypercriticon examinis vetustissimi m. Moraviae situs et vindiciarum anonymi Belae regis scribae (St. Katona)
- Onomasticon honoribus Mariae Theresiae
- Oratio inaug. Occasione instauratarum Posonii litterarum
- Onomasticon honoribus M. Theresiae Aug. Hung. Reginae
- Oratio inaug. in Regio Posoniensi Gymnasio habita 1777 (scientias in Hungaria instauratas novumque systema introductum).
- Ode in adventum Clementis AA. et Electoris Trevirensis
- Ode in reditum Josephi II. Parisiis
- Ode in reditum com. Francisci Balassa e commissione regia
- Oratio quam pro die 13. Maji 1780. dum sub praesidio comitis Balassa reg. Tallosiense orphanotrophium Szemptzini collocaretur adornavit
- Laudatio funebris in exequiis Antonii Mancini professoris Posoniensis. U. ott, 1783.
- Georgii Papanek compendiata historia gentis Slavae, per Georgium Fándy cum notis G. Szklenar. Tyrnaviae, 1793.

== Sources ==
- Tibenský, Ján (1958). J. Papánek — J. Sklenár. Obrancovia slovenskej národnosti v XVIII. storočí (in Slovak). Martin: Osveta.
- Marsina, Richard (2000). "Historik Juraj Sklenár (1744 – 1790)". In Ján, Bobák (ed.). Historický zborník (in Slovak). Vol. 10. Martin: Matica slovenská. ISBN 80-7090-573-5.
- Marsina, Richard (2014). "Knieža či kráľ Svätopluk a slovenské dejiny". In Ján, Bobák (ed.). Historický zborník (PDF) (in Slovak). Vol. 24. Martin: Matica slovenská. ISBN 978-80-8128-122-8.
