= Svatopluk I of Moravia =

Ruler of Great Moravia from 870 to 894

Svatopluk I
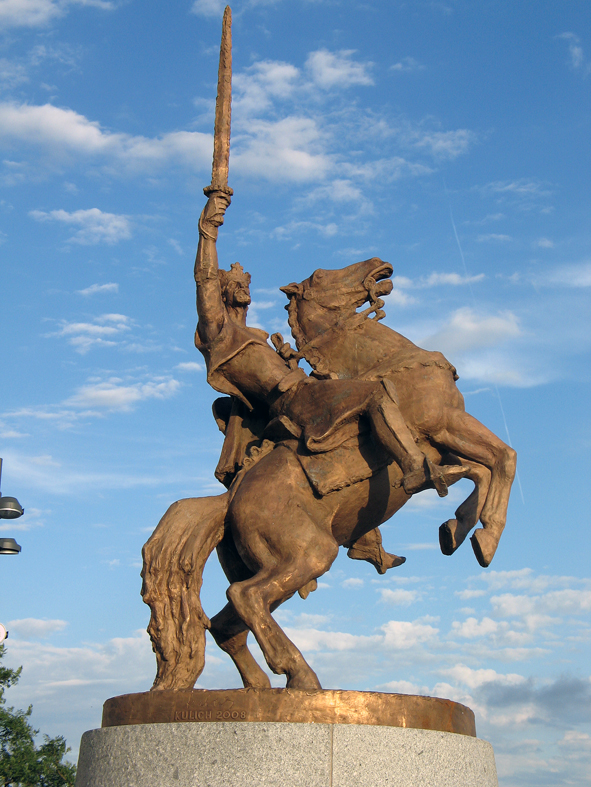
- Statue of Svätopluk on Bratislava Castle, Slovakia

Prince of Nitra
- Reign: before 867–870

Duke of Moravia
- Reign: 870–871
- Predecessor: Rastislav
- Successor: Slavomir
- Reign: 871 – before 885
- Predecessor: Slavomír
- Successor: Himself as King of Great Moravia

King of Great Moravia
- Reign: before 885 – 894
- Predecessor: Himself as Duke of Moravia
- Successor: Mojmir II
- Born: c. 840
- Died: 894
- Spouse: Svetežizna
- Issue: Mojmír II; Svatopluk II; Predslav (?)
- House: House of Mojmír
- Father: Bogislav (?), Svetimir (?)
- Mother: Unknown

Svatopluk I or Svätopluk I, also known as Svatopluk the Great, (Note: Medieval Latin: Zuentepulc(us), Zuentibald, Sventopulch(us), Zvataplug; Old Church Slavic: Свѧтопълкъ and transliterated Svętopъłkъ; Polish: Świętopełk; Greek: Σφενδοπλόκος, Sfendoplókos.) was a ruler of Great Moravia, which attained its maximum territorial expansion during his reign (870–871, 871–894).

Svatopluk's career started in the 860s, when he governed a principality within Moravia, the location of which is still a matter of debate among historians, under the suzerainty of his uncle, Rastislav. In 870 Svatopluk dethroned Rastislav, who was a vassal of Louis the German, and betrayed him to the Franks. Within a year, however, the Franks also imprisoned Svatopluk. After the Moravians rebelled against the Franks, Svatopluk was released and led the rebels to victory over the invaders. Although he was obliged to pay tribute to East Francia under the peace treaty concluded at Forchheim (Germany) in 874, he was able to expand his territories outside the Franks' sphere of interest in the following years. His forces even invaded the March of Pannonia within East Francia in 882.

Svatopluk established a good relationship with the popes, and he and his people were formally taken under the protection of the Holy See in 880. Pope Stephen V even addressed him as "King" in a letter written in 885. Svatopluk seems to have wanted to appease the German clergy who opposed the conducting of the liturgy in Old Church Slavonic, and he expelled the disciples of Methodius from Moravia in 886, after their teacher's death.

Svatopluk's state was a loose assemblage of principalities and also included conquered territories.

Not long after his death Svatopluk's realm of Great Moravia collapsed in the midst of a power struggle between his sons and the intensifying Hungarian raids.

Svatopluk, whose empire encompassed parts of the territory of modern Czech Republic (Moravia and Bohemia), Slovakia, Poland and Hungary, has occasionally been presented as a "Slovak King" in Slovak literary works since the 18th century, the period of the Slovak national awakening.

== Early years ==
The Annals of Fulda refer to Svatopluk as a nephew of Rastislav, the second known ruler of Great Moravia. Svatopluk was most probably born around 840. His father's name was Svetimir, according to the late 12th-century Chronicle of the Priest of Duklja, a medieval historical work long dismissed as a collection of fact and fiction. According to the unproven later Moravian tradition of Tomáš Pešina z Čechorodu (17th century), who fulfilled the family tree of the House of Mojmír, Svatopluk was the son of a certain Bogislav. According to Simon of Kéza his father was Morot, a Prince of Poland who had subdued Bractari and occupied Crișana before retiring to Veszprém.

Svatopluk seems to have risen to power in Great Moravia in the early 860s. The Life of Methodius relates that Svatopluk and his uncle jointly asked the Byzantine Emperor Michael III to send missionaries who were familiar with the Slavic tongue to Moravia. Michael III chose two brothers, Cyril and Methodius, who were fluent in the dialect of Slavic spoken in the environs of Thessaloniki (Greece). They arrived in Moravia in 863, and immediately set to work teaching and preaching. Their translation of liturgical texts into Old Church Slavonic was approved by Pope Hadrian II in 867.

And it came to pass in those days that the Slavic prince Rostislav together with Svatopluk sent emissaries from Moravia to Emperor Michael, saying thus: "We have prospered through God's grace, and many Christian teachers have come to us from among the Italians, Greeks and Germans, teaching us in various ways. But we Slavs are a simple people, and have no one to instruct us in the truth, and explain wisely. Therefore, O kind lord, send the type of man who will direct us to the whole truth."

— The Life of Methodius

== Beginning of his reign ==
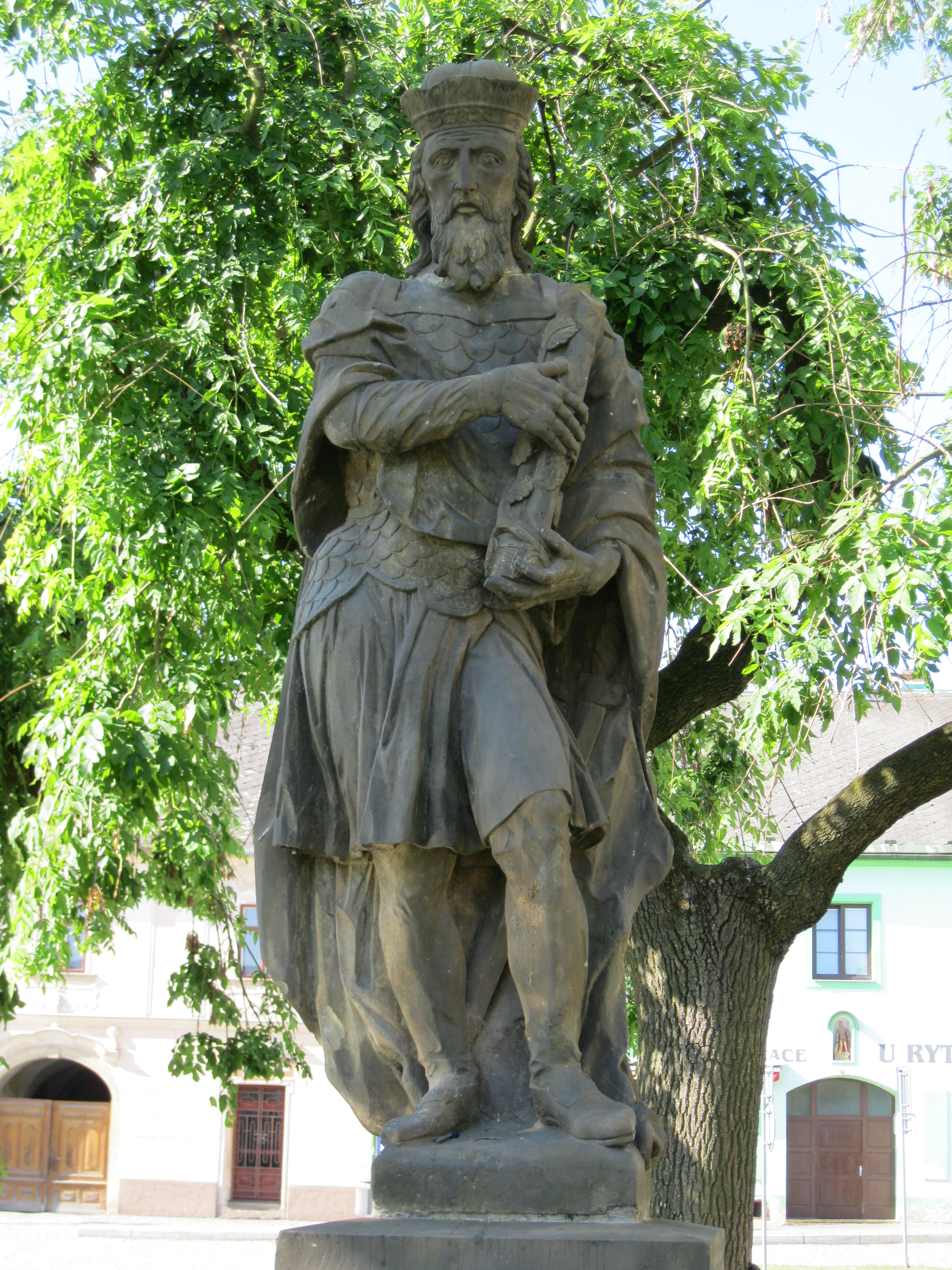
Statue of Svatopluk I in Loštice, Czech Republic

By the time Svatopluk first appeared in a Frankish sources (the Annals of Fulda) in 869, he was ruler of his own "realm" (regnum, implying autonomous or semi-autonomous land) within Great Moravia. This is generally accepted to be the Duchy of Nitra. His court was at "Rastislav's old city" (urbs antique Rastizi), which may have been either at Staré Město whose name literally means "old city" in Czech, or at Nitra (today in Slovakia), but it has also been identified with Sirmium (Sremska Mitrovica in Serbia).

Svatopluk's "realm" was invaded and plundered in 869 by Bavarian troops led by Carloman, the eldest son of Louis the German, King of East Francia. At the same time Franconian and Alamannian troops attacked Rastislav's territories under the leadership of the same King's youngest son, Charles the Fat. Although the two armies soon returned, Svatopluk entered into clandestine negotiations with Carloman, and agreed to commend himself and his principality to Carloman.

Having learned of this agreement, Rastislav is said to have become furious and set a trap for his nephew, inviting him to a banquet where he intended to have him murdered. Svatopluk, however, was warned of his uncle's plans, took Rastislav prisoner and handed him over to Carloman. Rastislav was sent to Bavaria under guard, while Carloman annexed his realm outright.

Zwentibald, Rastiz's nephew, took thought to his own interests, and commended himself and the kingdom he held to Carloman. Rastiz was furious at this and laid ambushes in secret for his nephew; he plotted to strangle him at a banquet when he was not suspecting any attack. But by the grace of God he was freed of the peril of death. For before those who were to kill him had entered the house, he was warned by one who knew of the plot, and set out as if to go hawking, and so evaded the ambush laid for him. Rastiz saw that his plot was revealed and followed after his nephew with soldiers to capture him. But by the just judgment of God he was caught in the snare he had set, for he was captured by his nephew, bound and brought to Carloman, who sent him under guard of soldiers to Bavaria least he should escape and had him kept in prison until he could be brought to the king's presence.

— Annals of Fulda (year 870)

As a reward for capturing Rastislav, Carloman allowed Svatopluk to retain his principality, but the rest of Great Moravia was placed under the control of two Frankish lords, William and Engilschalk. Carloman's forces also captured Methodius, whom Pope Hadrian II had earlier appointed Archbishop of Sirmium with jurisdiction over the realms ruled by Rastislav and Svatopluk. Early in 871 Carloman also imprisoned Svatopluk on unspecified charges of disloyalty, which may have been connected to the rebellion of Carloman's younger brothers, Louis the Younger and Charles the Bald. Believing that Svatopluk was dead, the Moravians selected another member of their ruling family named Slavomír and made him their ruler.

== Towards the Peace of Forchheim ==
Carloman soon came to the conclusion that the accusations against Svatopluk were unfounded and released him from prison. In order to bind Svatopluk to his family, Carloman had Svatopluk stand as godfather to his illegitimate grandson. Thus this son of Carloman's son Arnulf received the Moravian name Zwentibold.

Svatopluk also agreed to lead Carloman's armies against Slavomír and the rebellious Moravians. However, on his arrival at "Rastislav's old city", Svatopluk betrayed the Bavarians and conspired secretly with the rebels. Although he captured the fortress in accordance with Carloman's plan, once he was inside its walls he renounced his loyalty to Carloman, rallied a large Moravian force and launched a devastating surprise attack on the unsuspecting Bavarian army encamped outside. The Moravians took a great number of soldiers hostage, killed the rest and rid Moravia of the Frankish occupation. Carloman's governors, William and Engelschalk, were also both slain, and Svatopluk became the undisputed ruler of Great Moravia.

Meanwhile Zwentibald, after no one had been able to prove the crimes of which he had been accused, was released by Carloman and returned to his own realm laden with kingly gifts, leading with him an army of Carloman's, with which he was to drive out Sclagamar, for so much he had falsely promised to Carloman, should Carloman allow him to return to his country. But just as humiliation falls on those who are careless and trust too much in themselves, so it befell that army, for Zwentibald left the others to pitch camp and entered the old city of Rastiz. Immediately he denied his fidelity and forgot his oath, in Slavic fashion, and turned his thought and his powers not to driving out Sclagamar but to revenging the injury which Carloman had done him. Then he attacked in great force the Bavarians' camp – they suspected no evil and were not keeping a sharp watch. He took many alive as prisoners, and killed the rest, except for a few who had prudently left the camp beforehand. All the Bavarians' joy at their many previous victories was turned into grief and weeping. On the news of the slaughter of his army, Carloman was aghast, and forced by necessity he ordered all the hostages in his kingdom to be collected together and returned to Zwentibald; he received scarcely one man from there except for a man called Radbod who returned half-dead.

— Annals of Fulda (year 871)

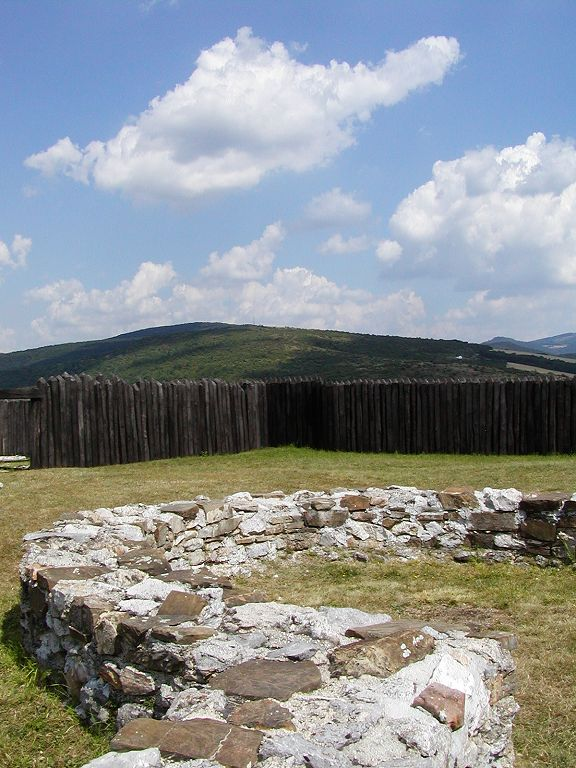
The ruins of a Moravian fort on Kostolec Hill at Ducové (Slovakia)

In October 871 Louis the German sent Bavarian and Franconian troops against the Bohemians (Czechs). During the campaign the Franconians surprised a party of Moravians somewhere near the traps that guarded the narrow approaches to a Bohemian fort. The Moravians were returning to their homeland with the daughter of a Bohemian dux ("duke"), presumably to marry an unidentified Moravian magnate. Although the Moravians managed to reach the safety of the fort, they had to abandon 644 fully equipped horses in the narrows. The marriage of a Bohemian leader's daughter to a Moravian magnate implies that Svatopluk was planning to form an alliance with the Bohemians.

Louis the German realized the grave threat posed by Svatopluk and assembled forces for a multipronged expedition with pincer movements advancing on Moravian territory from several directions in 872. One army was sent out "against the Moravian Slavs" from Regensburg (Germany) in May, but the Thuringian and Saxon soldiers fled in their first encounter with the enemy. The second army, composed of Franconians under Bishop Arn of Würzburg and Abbot Sigihard of Fulda, experienced mixed results: although their forces fought well, the majority of the men were killed, and only a handful of survivors returned to East Francia. Finally a third force, consisting of Bavarians and Carantanians under Carloman's command, laid Moravian territories to waste, put Svatopluk's army to flight and forced it to take refuge in an "extremely well fortified stronghold". Svatopluk, however, soon assembled a large army and attacked the Bavarians who had been left behind under the command of Bishop Emriacho of Regensburg to guard ships on the bank of the river Danube.

In May 873, Pope John VIII moved energetically to discover the whereabouts of Methodius, who was still being held prisoner in Bavaria. He sent harshly worded letters to Carloman and the Bavarian bishops, and commanded Methodius's immediate reinstatement. The Pope seems also to have brokered a lasting peace between Louis the German and Svatopluk. After his meeting with the Pope at Verona (Italy), Louis the German went to Forchheim where, according to the Annals of Fulda, "he received the legates of Svatopluk asking for a peace treaty". The exact terms of their agreement are not known, but it seems to have been a compromise: Svatopluk was forced to make an annual payment of tribute to Louis the German, who agreed to avoid any hostile acts against Great Moravia. Thus Methodius, who had in the meantime been allowed to return to Moravia, could continue his work in relatively peaceful conditions for some years.

== Years of expansion ==
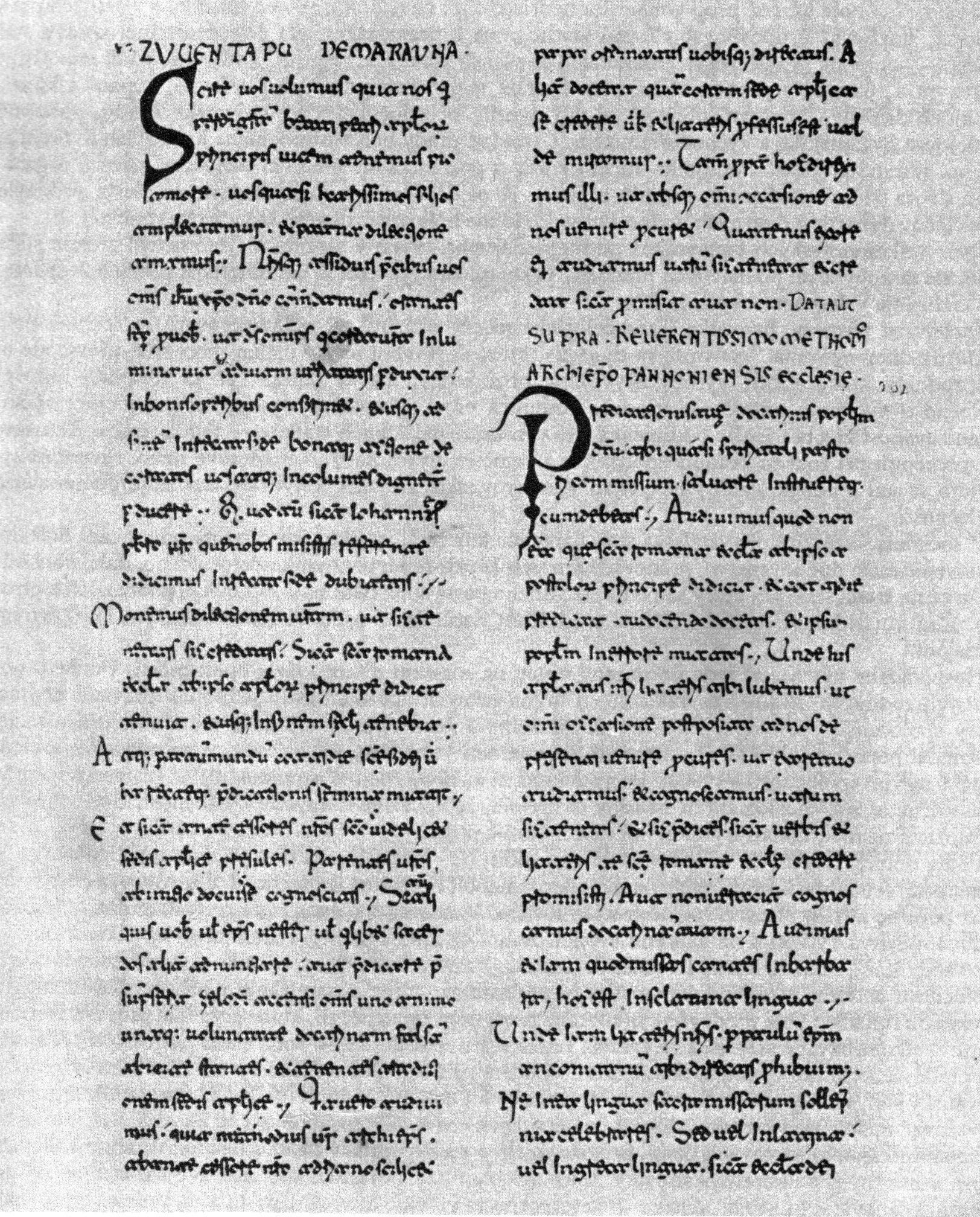
The papal letter Scire vos volumus, written in 879 by Pope John VIII to Svatopluk I

Certain and disputed territories of Great Moravia under Svatopluk I (according to modern historians)

Great Moravia underwent considerable expansion in the 870s. For instance, the Life of Methodius refers to the capture of "a very powerful pagan prince settled on the Vistula" in territory of later Poland, and a letter written around 900 by Archbishop Theotmar of Salzburg states that Svatopluk conquered the region of Nitra, which had been thereto inhabited by pagans. Modern historiography, however, has tended to question the claims that huge neighboring territories were permanently annexed by Great Moravia. For instance, there is little clear archaeological or written evidence of a permanent extension of Moravian power in Lesser Poland or to the west in Silesia, or in Pannonia, as is suggested in earlier historical works.

Svatopluk's expansionist policy was perhaps so successful because most of Western Europe was in the grip of unusually savage and large-scale Viking raids between 879 and 886. On the other hand, the Life of Methodius directly links Svatopluk's military achievements and Methodius' work. For instance, according to his Life, Methodius promised Svatopluk that if the Prince would celebrate Saint Peter's Day in the Archbishop's church, "God will soon deliver" his enemies to him, and "so it came to pass".

Nevertheless, at the court of Svatopluk, who himself professed the Latin Rite, intrigues against Methodius and the liturgy in Old Church Slavonic gathered strength. Svatopluk sent John of Venice, a known opponent of the Slavic liturgy, to Rome in 879 to achieve a settlement of ecclesiastical differences. In a letter addressed to Methodius in the same year, the Pope sharply rebuked him for using Slavonic in church services. Methodius, however, travelled to Rome in 880, together with a Moravian delegation. Under his influence Pope John VIII changed his mind and in a letter, known for its incipit, Industriae tuae, the Pope repeated that Mass was to be sung in Latin whenever requested, but he also allowed the use of Slavonic liturgy. The letter also confirmed the decision taken by the Holy See during Rastislav's reign to create an archdiocese for Great Moravia. Upon Svatopluk's request the Pope promoted a German priest, Wiching, to be Bishop of Nitra, but he added that the new Bishop and all the clerics in Great Moravia were expected to be obedient to Methodius, who remained the head of the church in Svatopluk's realms.

Your predecessor /Pope John VIII/ ordained Wiching bishop at the request of Duke Zwentibald; however, he never sent him into the ancient bishopric of Passau but to a newly baptized people whom that duke had defeated in war and converted from paganism to Christianity

— Letter of Archbishop Theotmar of Salzburg and his suffragan bishops to Pope John IX

== The "Wilhelminer War" ==
At the time when Charles the Fat became the sole ruler of East Francia in 881, the sons of Wilhelm and Engelschalk, the one-time commanders of the Bavarian forces occupying Moravia in 870–871, began to conspire with various Bavarian magnates in order to eject Arbo, the margrave Louis the German had appointed to command a key part of East Francia's frontier on the Danube. Arbo, however, appealed for and received help from both Charles the Fat and Svatopluk, and even handed his son over to the latter as a hostage.

Upon Arbo's request, Svatopluk, who remembered "how much evil he along with his people had suffered" at the hands of Wilhelm and Engelschalk, attacked their sons. His forces soon captured Engelschalk's second son who was mutilated at Svatopluk's order. Thereafter the remaining sons withdrew from the authority of Charles the Fat and become the men of Carloman's son, Arnulf, who was ruling in Pannonia at that time. Learning of this, Svatopluk sent ambassadors to Arnulf, demanding that the sons of Wilhelm and Engelschalk be immediately sent away. Arnulf, however, refused to hand them over, to which Svatopluk responded with further invasions. In addition to the Franks and Moravians, the Bulgarians also entered the conflict by invading Svatopluk's realm. According to a record in the Annals of Salzburg, the region of Vienna (Austria) was also invaded in 881 by Hungarians. They seem to have been hired either by Svatopluk or by Arnulf in order to intervene in their conflict.

Thus the "Willhelminer War", that was to last until 884, led to the devastation of Pannonia east of the river Rába. Finally, Charles the Fat himself turned up and received Svatopluk as his man at Kaumberg (Germany), receiving promises of peace and fidelity. Svatopluk also promised never to invade Charles the Fat's realm with a hostile force as long as he lived, while Charles the Fat recognized him as a prince of his realm. Peace between Arnulf and Svatopluk, however, was only sealed in the latter part of the following year.

They /the sons of Wilhelm and Engelschalk/ despised the peace, which in being preserved Pannonia, but which being broken led to Pannonia's being laid waste from the Raab eastward within the space of two and a half years. Male and female slaves with their children were killed, many of the leading men were killed, captured, or – what is more disgraceful – had their hand or tongue or genitals cut off and were sent back.

— Annals of Fulda (year 884)

== Last years ==
Methodius, who seems to have been in Svatopluk's train at Kaumberg, died in 885. In his last days he had indicated Gorazd, one of his Moravian disciples, as most worthy to succeed him. Gorazd, however, did not or could not immediately submit his candidature for ratification of the Holy See, because Bishop Wiching of Nitra soon hurried to Rome. He persuaded Pope Stephen V that Methodius had ignored Pope John VIII's orders in the matter of Slavonic liturgy, and thus, upon his initiative, the pope prohibited the Slavonic liturgy in Moravia. The pope also sent a letter (Quia te zelo) to Svatopluk, urging him to accept the addition of filioque to the Creed and to give up such peculiar Byzantine practices as fasting on Saturday.

Wiching having arrived back from Rome, Svatopluk summoned Gorazd, Clement and Methodius's other disciples to submit to the papal directions. When they refused to do so, Svatopluk gave Wiching a free hand to take action against them. Some of them were first thrown into prison, and soon expelled from Moravia, while others, among them Naum, were sold as slaves. The expulsion of Methodius's disciples from Moravia signaled the end of the Slavonic liturgy in Central Europe. The exiles, however, subsequently found refuge in the First Bulgarian Empire where they were able to carry on their work. Saint Clement of Ochrid said:

The Prince, however, understood very little of what was said, as he was too completely and utterly dumb to comprehend any divine matter; he was brought up in a sheer barbaric manner, briefly said, with no education whatsoever, and also [...] because vicarious pleasures rid him of all his sense. How could a man entirely distanced from the sanctity of modest life, without which no one lays his eyes on the Lord, ever penetrate any contemplations of the Trinity?

In his letter Quia te zelo, the pope addressed Svatopluk as rex Sclavorum ("king of the Slavs"). Although Svatopluk's royal title was not recognized by the contemporary Annals of Fulda, the chronicler Regino of Prüm also referred to Svatopluk as rex Marahensium Sclavorum ("king of the Moravian Slavs") in the early 10th century, which is independent evidence confirming that Svatopluk held the title of king. According to the late 12th-century Chronicle of the Priest of Duklja, Svatopluk had been crowned "king in the Roman fashion on the field of Dalma" in the presence of a papal legate, cardinals, and bishops.

In 887 Arnulf, Svatopluk's opponent in the "Wilhelminer War", became the king of East Francia. They met at Omuntesperch, a locality that has yet not been identified, during the winter of 890. At the meeting Svatopluk transmitted to Arnulf a message from Pope Stephen V, urging the king to invade Italy to protect the Holy See. According to Regino of Prüm, the two monarchs also concluded an agreement, in which Arnulf ceded the ducatus of the Bohemians to Svatopluk.

In the year of the Lord's incarnation 890, King Arnulf gave the command of the Bohemians to King Zwentibald of the Moravian Slavs. Hitherto, the Bohemians had rulers from among their own kind and people, and had kept the fidelity they promised to the kings of the Franks by inviolable agreement. Arnulf did this because, before he had been raised to the throne of the kingdom, he had been joined to Zwentibald in close friendship.

— Regino of Prüm: Chronicon, Book II

Sometime during 891, according to the Annals of Fulda, Arnulf sent an embassy led by margrave Arbo to Moravia in order to renew the peace. A letter written by the margrave soon announced that the legates were returning from Svatopluk and the Moravians who had agreed "to give themselves in friendship". Svatopluk, however, broke his pledges, so Arnulf decided to invade Moravia in 891. First the king met with Braslav, the Slavic dux on the river Sava, then raised an army of Franconians, Bavarians and Alamanni, and also recruited Hungarians to join his campaign. In the late 10th century, Arnulf was accused by Ottonian authors of unleashing the Hungarians on Europe because of his desire to bring down Moravia.

Meanwhile, Arnulf, the strongest king of the nations living below the star Arcturus, could not overcome Sviatopolk, duke of the Moravians, who we mentioned above, with the latter fighting back in a manly way; and – alas! – having dismantled those very well fortified barriers which we said earlier are called "closures" by the populace, Arnulf summoned to his aid the nation of the Hungarians, greedy, rash, ignorant of almighty God but well versed in every crime, avid only for murder and plunder; if indeed it can be called "aid", since a little later, with him dying, it proved to be grave peril, and even the occasion of ruin, for his people alongside the other nations living in the south and west.

— Liudprand of Cremona: Retribution, Book One

Arnulf's invasion started in July 892, but he failed to defeat Svatopluk. The war against Moravia seems to have continued until 894. This was the year of Svatopluk's "most unlucky death", according to the Annals of Fulda, which implies that he met his end in some kind of mishap, the sort that occurs in war. The exact circumstances of Svatopluk's death, however, are unknown.

Zwentibald, the dux of the Moravians and the source of all treachery, who had disturbed all the lands around him with tricks and cunning and circled around thirsting for human blood, made an unhappy end, exhorting his men at the last that they should not be lovers of peace but rather continue in enmity with their neighbors.

— Annals of Fulda (year 894)

Simon of Kéza recorded that he died in battle near Környe.

== Legacy ==
Following Svatopluk's death, Great Moravia, which had achieved its maximum territorial extension, and exercised its greatest influence in his reign, ceased to be a political factor in Central Europe. Among the conquered peoples, the Czechs were the first to withdraw in 895. Although—at least, according to the testimony of the Byzantine Emperor Constantine Porphyrogenitus—Svatopluk had made a deathbed request to his sons, Mojmir II of Moravia and Svatopluk II, that they remain united (using "The Bundle of Sticks" fable), after his death internal disagreements between them were fostered by Arnulf. Finally Moravia collapsed in the first decade of the 10th century due to the invasion of the Hungarians.

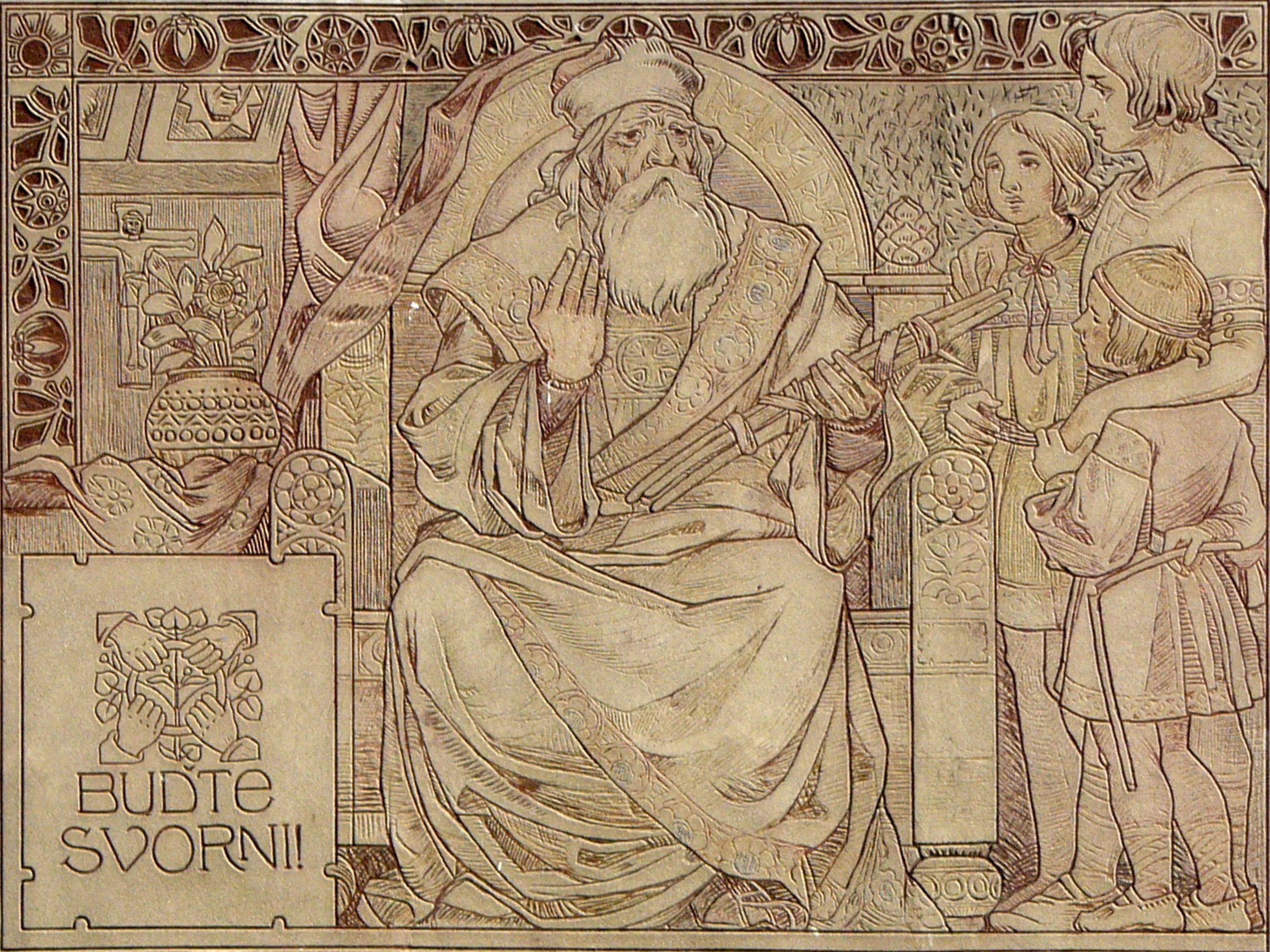
The legend of Svatopluk's three wands

The prince of Moravia, Sphendoplokos, was valiant and terrible to the nations that were his neighbors. This same Sphendoplokos had three sons, and when he was dying he divided his country into three parts and left a share apiece to his three sons, leaving the eldest to be great prince and the other two to be under the command of the eldest son. He exhorted them not to fall out with one another, giving them this example by way of illustration: he brought three wands and bound them together and gave them to the first son to break them, and when he was not strong enough, handed them on to the second, and in like manner to the third, and then separated the three wands and gave one each to the three of them; when they had taken them and were bidden to break them, they broke them through at once. By means of this illustration he exhorted them and said: "If you remain undivided in concord and love, you shall be unconquered by your adversaries and invincible; but if strife and rivalry come among you and you divide yourselves into three governments, not subject to the eldest brother, you shall be both destroyed by one another and brought to utter ruin by the enemies who are your neighbors."

— Constantine Porphyrogenitus: On Administering the Empire, Chapter 41

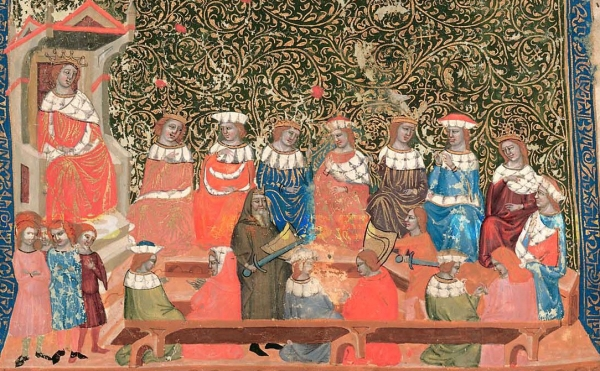
Svatopluk I disguised as a monk in the court of Arnulf, King of East Francia (from the 14th-century Chronicle of Dalimil)

According to Hungarian legends, the Hungarians purchased the country from Svatopluk in a symbolic act of exchange: they sent a white horse with saddler to Svatopluk in return for some earth, water and grass, supposed to represent his country itself. Svatopluk allegedly disavowed this "contract" and then drowned in the Danube in flight from the Hungarians. The legend, in fact, seems to merely describe a common pagan rite of concluding alliances which might refer to Svatopluk's alliance with the Hungarians in 894.

Historian Ryszard Grzesik says that the ruler Menumorut, mentioned in the 13th-century chronicle Gesta Hungarorum was the "personification" of Svatopluk I of Moravia.

Nevertheless, in 1722 Michael Bencsik, a professor of Hungarian law at the University of Trnava, suggested that the nobility and the whole population of Trencsén county within the Kingdom of Hungary were "the remnants of Svatopluk who sold his country to the Hungarians, and thus the Slovak people, into eternal serfdom". In response, Ján Baltazár Magin, the Roman Catholic pastor of Dubnica, wrote the oldest known defense of the Slovak nation in 1728. Next another Catholic priest, Juraj Fándly, completed a history in Latin entitled Compendiata historia gentis Slavae ("A Brief History of the Slovak Nation") in which he depicted Moravia as a state of Slovaks and Svatopluk as their king. In 1833 the poet Ján Hollý published a poem entitled Svätopluk, the first of a series of epic poems dealing with the past of the Slovak people.

== See also ==
- Alternative theories of the location of Great Moravia
- Arnulf of Carinthia
- Great Moravia
- Louis the German
- Mojmir II
- Saints Cyril and Methodius
- Svatopluk II

== Sources ==
- Barford, Paul M. (2001). The Early Slavs: Culture and Society in Early Medieval Eastern Europe. Ithaca: Cornell University Press. ISBN 0801439779.
- Bartl, Július (2002). Slovak History. Bolchazy-Carducci Publishers. ISBN 0-86516-444-4.
- Betti, Maddalena (2013). The Making of Christian Moravia (858-882): Papal Power and Political Reality. Leiden-Boston: Brill. ISBN 9789004260085.
- Bowlus, Charles R. (1995). Franks, Moravians, and Magyars: The Struggle for the Middle Danube, 788-907. Philadelphia: University of Pennsylvania Press. ISBN 9780812232769.
- Curta, Florin (2006). Southeastern Europe in the Middle Ages, 500–1250. Cambridge: Cambridge University Press. ISBN 9780521815390.
- Fine, John Van Antwerp Jr. (1991) [1983]. The Early Medieval Balkans: A Critical Survey from the Sixth to the Late Twelfth Century. Ann Arbor, Michigan: University of Michigan Press. ISBN 0472081497.
- Grzesik, Ryszard (2016). "Blasi and Pastores Romanorum in the Gesta Hungarorum by an Anonymous Notary". Res Historica. 41: 25–34. doi:10.17951/rh.2016.0.25.
- Goldberg, Eric J. (2006). Struggle for Empire: Kingship and Conflict under Louis the German, 817-876. Ithaca, NY: Cornell University Press. ISBN 9780801438905.
- Havlík, Lubomír E. (1994). Svatopluk Veliký, král Moravanů a Slovanů [Svatopluk the Great, King of the Moravians and Slavs]. Jota. ISBN 978-80-85617-19-1.
- Havlík, Lubomír E. (2013). Kronika o Velké Moravě [Chronicle of Great Moravia]. Jota. ISBN 978-80-85617-04-7.
- Kantor, Marvin (1983). Medieval Slavic Lives of Saints and Princes. Ann Arbor: The University of Michigan Press. ISBN 9780930042448.
- Kirschbaum, Stanislav J (2005). A History of Slovakia: The Struggle for Survival. Palgrave. ISBN 1-4039-6929-9.
- Kirschbaum, Stanislav J (2007). Historical Dictionary of Slovakia. Scarecrow Press. ISBN 978-0-8108-5535-9.
- Kontler, László (1999). Millennium in Central Europe: A History of Hungary. Atlantisz Publishing House. ISBN 963-9165-37-9.
- MacLean, Simon (2003). Kingship and Politics in the Late Ninth Century: Charles the Fat and the End of the Carolingian Empire. Cambridge: Cambridge University Press. ISBN 9781139440295.
- MacLean, Simon (2009). History and Politics in Late Carolingian and Ottonian Europe: The Chronicle of Regino of Prüm and Adalbert of Magdeburg. Manchester and New York: Manchester University Press. ISBN 9780719071348.
- Moravcsik, Gyula, ed. (1967) [1949]. Constantine Porphyrogenitus: De Administrando Imperio (2nd revised ed.). Washington D.C.: Dumbarton Oaks Center for Byzantine Studies. ISBN 9780884020219.
- Nelson, Janet L. (1991). The Annals of St-Bertin. Manchester: Manchester University Press. ISBN 9780719034251.
- Reuter, Timothy (1992). The Annals of Fulda. Manchester: Manchester University Press. ISBN 9780719034589.
- Reuter, Timothy (2013) [1991]. Germany in the Early Middle Ages c. 800–1056. London and New York: Routledge. ISBN 9781317872399.
- Sommer, Petr; Třeštík, Dušan; Žemlička, Josef; Opačić, Zoë (2007). Bohemia and Moravia. In: Berend, Nora (2007); Christianization and the Rise of Christian Monarchy: Scandinavia, Central Europe and Rus’, c. 900–1200; Cambridge University Press; ISBN 978-0-521-87616-2.
- Spiesz, Anton; Caplovic, Dusan; Bolchazy, Ladislaus J. (2006). Illustrated Slovak History: A Struggle for Sovereignty in Central Europe. Bolchazy-Carducci Publishers, Inc. ISBN 978-0-86516-426-0.
- Squatriti, Paolo (2014). The Complete Works of Liudprand of Cremona (Medieval Texts in Translation). Washington, D.C.: Catholic University of America Press. ISBN 978-0-8132-1696-6. OCLC 986460633.
- Vlasto, Alexis P. (1970). The Entry of the Slavs into Christendom: An Introduction to the Medieval History of the Slavs. Cambridge: Cambridge University Press.

Svatopluk I of Moravia House of Mojmír Born: c. 840 Died: 894
Regnal titles
Preceded by Rastislav	Duke of the Moravians; 870–871	Succeeded by Slavomír
Preceded by Slavomír	Duke of the Moravians; 871–before 885	Succeeded by Himself as king
Preceded by Himself as duke	King of the Moravians after 885–894	Succeeded by Mojmír II
