= Arn (bishop of Würzburg) =

Saint Arn or Arno von Endsee (died 13 July 892) was the Bishop of Würzburg from 855 until his death. He was a pupil of Bishop Gozbald, who died on 20 September 855; Arn was elected bishop in his place. Arn was a warrior-prelate, recorded fighting against almost every external foe of the Germans at one point or another during his career.

In his first year in office, the cathedral of Würzburg was destroyed by lightning and Arn had to rebuild it. He was an active participator in the East Frankish government of Louis the German (who appointed him), Charles the Fat, and Arnulf of Carinthia.

In 871, Louis the German held an assembly at Frankfurt and from there sent Arn and Ruodolt, Margrave of the Nordgau, to defend the border between the Duchy of Bavaria and Great Moravia because he had heard that the Moravians were planning an invasion. The Moravians had constructed a very large, circular wall to force the Germans through a very narrow opening and thus cut them off from fleeing. Arn, however, aware of the trap, caught a Moravian army leading back a Bohemian bride offguard and forced it into the trap. The Moravian were forced to abandon their horses and flee on foot. In 872, however, he assisted Carloman of Bavaria against Svatopluk of Moravia and was defeated.

In 884, Arn and Henry of Franconia led the forces of all East Francia against a Viking army invading Saxony and were victorious. In 892, Arn, on the advice of Poppo, Duke of Thuringia, had undertaken an expedition against the Wends and was killed, either during a mass on the Chemnitz near Frankenburg or, after withdrawing to Sandberg (perhaps Wiederau or Taurastein), in a decisive battle with the Slavs. Poppo was deposed from his office for his poor counsel and Arn was replaced by Rudolf, a member of the Conradine family.

He is buried in St-Aegidien in Colditz and was immediately reckoned a martyr. He was finally canonised in the 18th century. Around 1250, a chapel was built in his honour at Mittweida.

== See also ==
- Arno of Salzburg

== Sources ==
- Reuter, Timothy (trans.) The Annals of Fulda. (Manchester Medieval series, Ninth-Century Histories, Volume II.) Manchester: Manchester University Press, 1992.
- "Arno (Bischof zu Würzburg)." Allgemeine Deutsche Biographie, by the Historischen Kommission bei der Bayrischen Akademie der Wissenschaften, Band 1, Seite 577. (Retrieved 14 June 2007, 3:51 UTC)
