= Slavomir of Moravia =

Slavomir

Duke of Moravia
- Reign: 871
- Predecessor: Svatopluk I
- Successor: Svatopluk I
- Born: Unknown
- Died: Unknown
- Spouse: None
- Issue: None
- House: House of Mojmír
- Father: Unknown
- Mother: Unknown

Slavomir (Latin: Sclagamarus, Czech and Slovak: Slavomír) was a duke of Moravia (871). He led a revolt against the Franks who had annexed Moravia during the incarceration of his relative, Svatopluk I.

== Early life ==
Slavomir, according to the Annals of Fulda, was a member of the Moravian ruling dynasty. He seems to have been a disciple of Saints Cyril and Methodius who had in 863 arrived in Moravia where they established an institution of higher education.

== Revolt against the Franks ==
Rastislav was arrested by his own nephew, Svatopluk I, in 870. However, Svatopluk himself was arrested in 870 on the order of the Louis the German's son, Carloman. Slavomir took over the throne during 871.

Zwentibald, Rastiz's nephew, was accused of breach of fidelity to Carloman and was imprisoned. The Moravian Slavs, thinking that their dux was dead, set a certain priest and a relative of the dux, Sclagamar, over themselves as prince; they threatened to kill him if he did not take up the office of dux. Of necessity, he agreed, and set out to make war on Engelschalk and William, Carloman's commanders, and drive them from the cities they had occupied. They fought back with equal force and after killing many of his army forced him to flee

— Annals of Fulda (year 871)

== See also ==
- Great Moravia
- Louis the German
- Saints Cyril and Methodius
- Svatopluk I

== Notes ==
Preceded by Svatopluk I	Duke of the Moravians; 871	Succeeded by Svatopluk I
