= Tatiana Štefanovičová =

Slovak archaeologist and historian (1934–2021)

Prof. PhDr. Tatiana Števanovičová CSc.
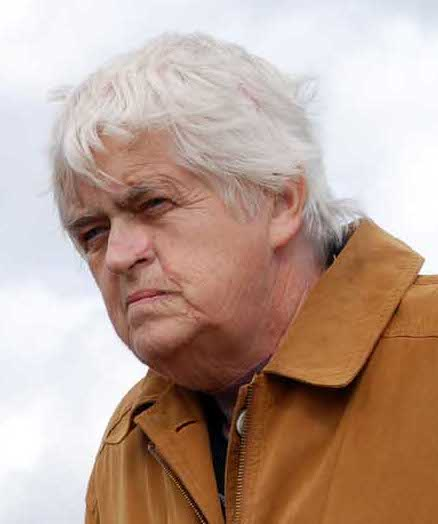
- Born: 10 March 1934; Bratislava, Czechoslovakia (now Slovakia)
- Died: 3 January 2021 (aged 86)
- Known for: Archaeological research and studies of history
- Scientific career
- Fields: Archaeology, history

Tatiana Štefanovičová (10 March 1934 – 3 January 2021) was a Slovak archaeologist and historian, one of leading experts in early history of Slovakia. Along with other research activities, she worked on excavations unearthing the oldest archeological remains of Bratislava at most Bratislava Castle.

== Selected works ==
- 1969 Bratislavský hrad [Bratislava Castle] (co-author)
- 1975 Bratislavský hrad v 9. až 12. storočí [Bratislava Castle in the 9th-12th centuries]
- 1988 Osudy starých Slovanov [Fate of the Ancient Slavs]
- 1993 Najstaršie dejiny Bratislavy [The Oldest History of Bratislava]
- 2004 Dóm sv. Martina v Bratislave [St. Martin's Cathedral in Bratislava]
- 2012 Dejiny Bratislavy 1 [History of Bratislava I] (co-author)

== Awards ==
- Pribina Cross, II. class (President of the Slovak Republic)
- Silver Plaque (Archaeological Institute of Slovak Academy of Sciences)
- Award for the work "Dejiny Bratislavy 1" (Slovak Archaeological Society)
