= Richard Marsina =

Slovak historian (1923–2021)

Prof. PhDr. Richard Marsina DrSc.
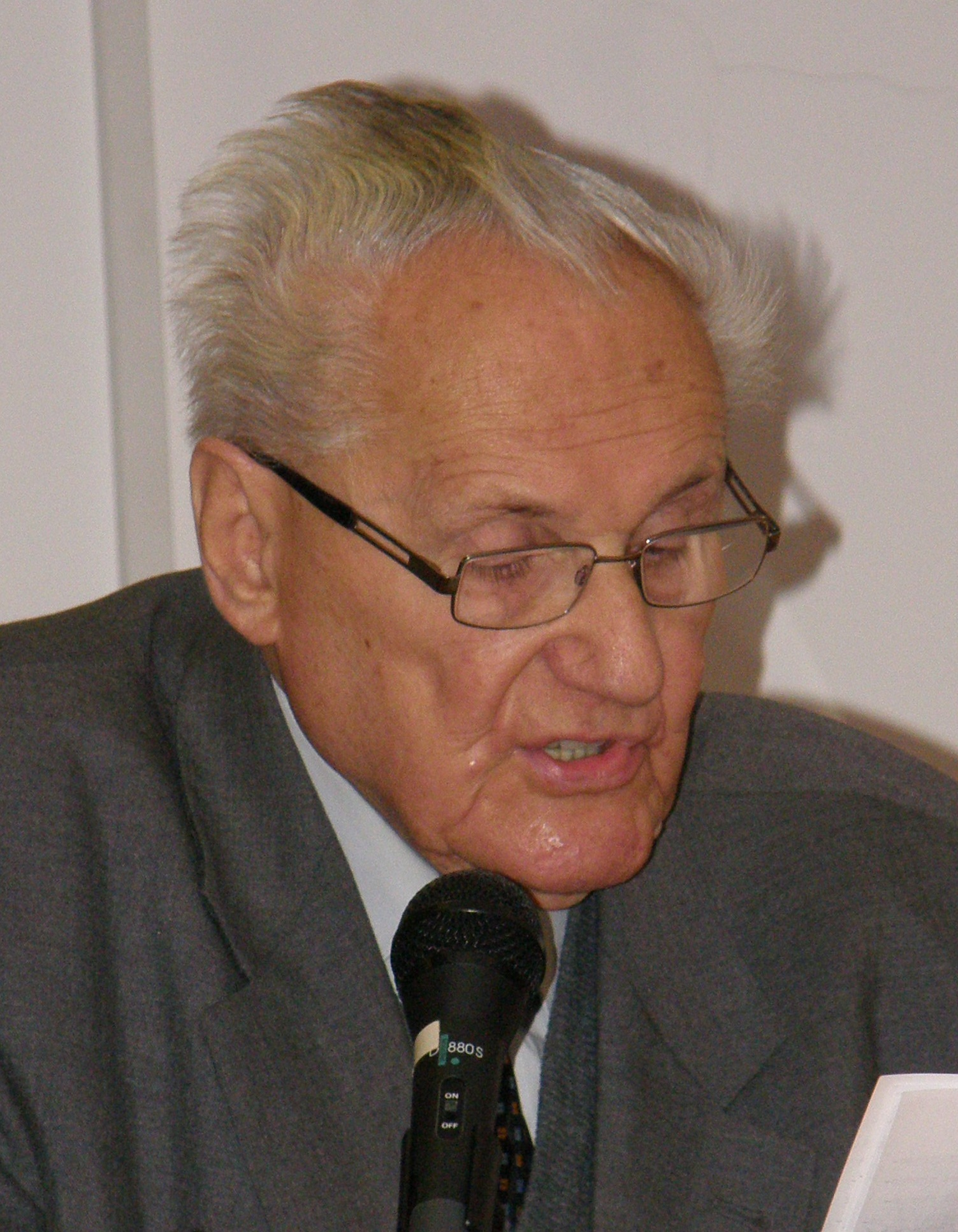
- Born: 4 May 1923; Šahy, Czechoslovakia (now Slovakia)
- Died: 25 March 2021 (aged 97); Bratislava, Slovakia

Academic work
- Discipline: Medieval history

Richard Marsina (4 May 1923 – 25 March 2021) was a Slovak historian, one of the founders of modern Slovak histography and a prominent expert on the medieval history of Slovakia. His scientific activities include research and publication of medieval sources, research of the oldest settlements in Slovakia, medieval towns, the history of Great Moravia, the Christianisation of Slovakia and of the Kingdom of Hungary and the oldest history of the Bishopric of Nitra. He worked in leading position at various scientific institutions like the Institute of History of the Slovak Academy of Sciences (SAS), the Slovak Society for History, the Scientific Board for Historical Sciences, Trnava University in Trnava, the Department of History at Matica slovenská and others. In the 1960s, he also worked at the research institute of SAS in Budapest, was the secretary of the Czechoslovak section of the joint Czech-Slovak-Hungarian historical commission (1960 – 1965, 1971 – 1983), and the secretary of the board of experts at the commission on the sharing of cultural heritage with the Hungarian People's Republic (1965 – 1968).

== Awards ==
- State award "For excellent work" (Czechoslovak government)
- Križko's medal for merit in archival science
- Sasinek's medal for merit in archival science
- Silver and gold plaque of Ľudovít Štúr in social sciences (Slovak Academy of Sciences)
- Gold medal of the Slovak Academy of Sciences
- Medal of István Széchényi (Hungarian Academy of Sciences)
- Medal of Štefan Moyses
- Pribina Cross, III. class (President of the Slovak Republic)
- Award of Ľudovít Novák in social sciences ex aequo
- Gold Medal of the Trnava University in Trnava
- Award of Daniel Rapant
- Honorary citizen of the town Žilina
