= Svatopluk II =

Prince in Moravia

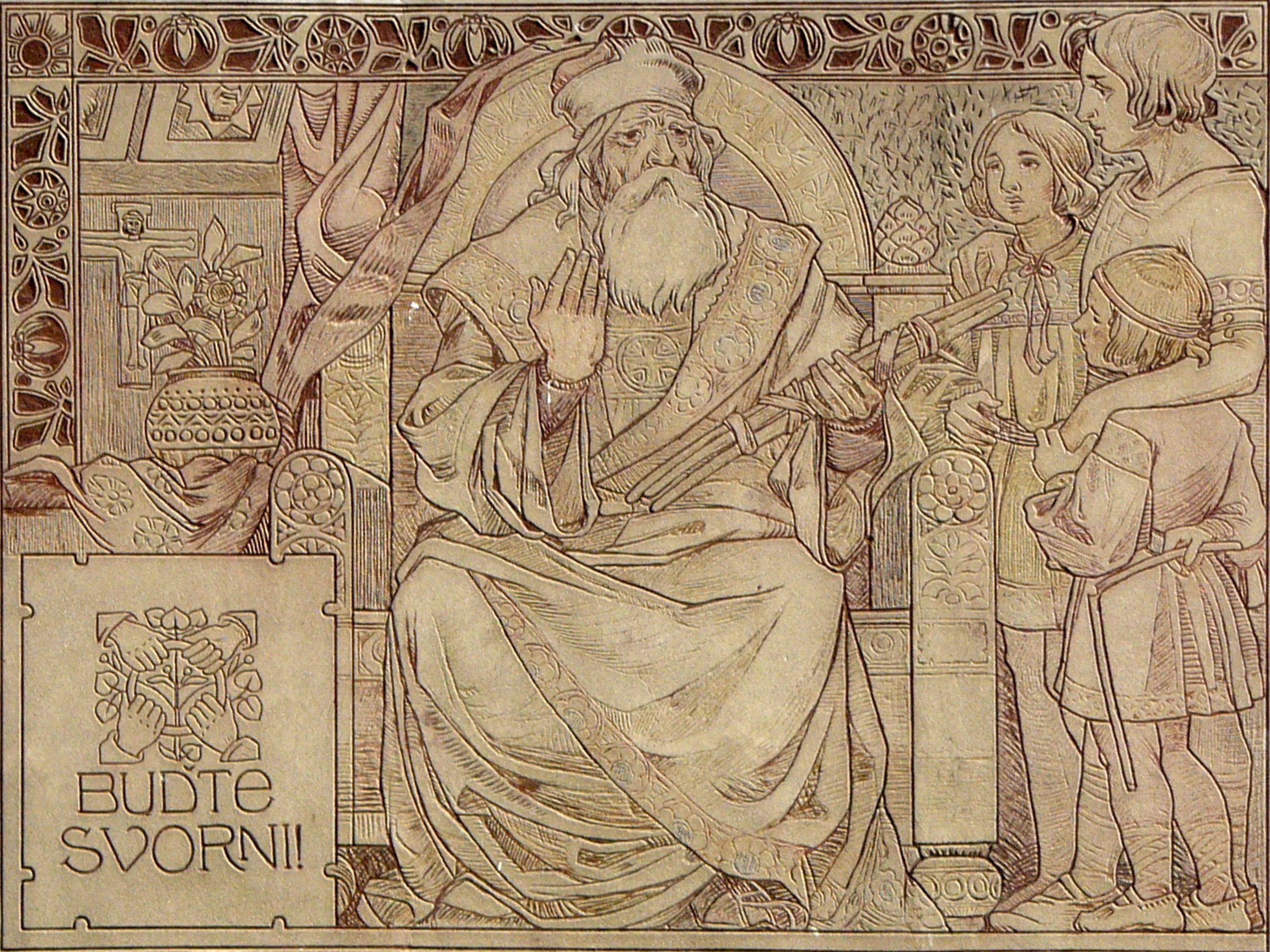
- Svatopluk II as one of the three sons of Svatopluk I on a picture

Prince in Moravia (maybe of Nitra)
- Reign: 894–899
- Predecessor: Svatopluk I
- Successor: Mojmir II
- Born: c. 884
- House: House of Mojmír
- Father: Svatopluk I or Morot
- Mother: Gisele?

Svatopluk II or Svätopluk II (Latin: Zentobolchus) was a member of the House of Mojmír and Prince in Moravia (maybe of Nitra) from 894 to 899, as which he strove to control all of Great Moravia. He was the son of Svatopluk I son of Morot.

== Biography ==
Svatopluk II was a younger son of Svatopluk I and grandson (according to Simon of Kéza) of Morot.

As Prince of Nitra, Svatopluk II was subordinated to Mojmír II, the King of Great Moravia which contained the principality as its province. Svatopluk II rebelled against Mojmír II in 898 in an attempt to take over control of Great Moravia. Their conflict climaxed when Bavarian troops intervened in the winter of 898/899.

Mojmír II defeated the Bavarians and captured Svatopluk II, but the Bavarians managed to rescue him and brought him to East Francia. Svatopluk II returned to the Principality of Nitra in 901. He probably died in 906 in fights with the Hungarians, who began to invade the Carpathian Basin in 896. Historical records contain no mention of Mojmír II, Svatopluk II, or their possible successors in connection with the three battles of Bratislava where the invading tribes defeated the Bavarian army.
