= Mojmir II of Moravia =

Ruler of Great Moravia

Mojmir II
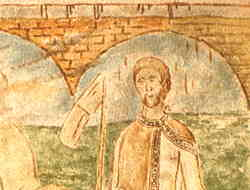

King of Great Moravia
- Reign: 894–probably 906
- Predecessor: Svatopluk I
- Successor: unknown
- Born: c. 872
- Died: 902 or 906
- House: House of Mojmír
- Father: Svatopluk I
- Mother: Svatožizna?

Mojmir II (Latin: Moymirus, Czech and Slovak: Mojmír II., born after 871, died probably 906) was a member of the House of Mojmir and from 894 the last known ruler of Great Moravia. The fate of Mojmir II remains unclear. He probably died in 906 in a battle against the Magyars.

== Biography ==
Mojmir II ruled at the same time as the son of Svatopluk I and grandson (according to Simon of Kéza) of Morot (a Prince of Poland who had subdued Bractari and ruled as Emperor of the Bulgars and Moravians). Prince Morot conquered Crișana and the people that are called Cozar inhabiting that land. This grandson of Prince Morot through Svatopluk I was called Menumorout (Stallion of Morout). As in the Hungarian "Menumarot" version of history, Mojmir II succeeded his father Svatopluk I as the king of Great Moravia in 894. At the same time, the Principality of Nitra was given as an appanage to his brother Svatopluk II. But Svatopluk II, supported by Arnulf of Carinthia, king of East Francia, rebelled against Mojmir II in 895 and again in 897, when he concluded an agreement of cooperation with Arnulf. As a result, Mojmir II attacked his brother, but was defeated by East Frankish troops sent to support Svatopluk II's rebellion.

Weakened by internal conflict, Great Moravia lost its peripheral territories: It ceded the Balaton Principality to the Eastern Franks in 894, after Magyar tribes had looted this region. Bohemia, seceding from Great Moravia in the following year, became Arnulf’s vassal, and Lusatia followed suit in 897. Another danger emerged, when Magyars crossed the Carpathians to settle permanently in the Carpathian Basin (895/896). In 896, they settled or were settled in the scarcely populated territories of Great Moravia, residing around the upper/middle Tisza River in 900/901. After several looting raids in Europe, they moved to Transdanubia.

Despite these disasters, Mojmir managed to consolidate his power. In 898 he asked the Pope to consecrate new Great Moravian clerics in order to decrease the influence of Bavarian clerics in his country. The Bavarians (Eastern Franks), upset by the 898 demand, sent troops to Great Moravia, which Mojmir defeated. Moreover, Mojmir captured the still rebellious Svatopluk II, but the latter was eventually rescued by the Bavarian troops, with whom he fled to Germany.

After the death of Arnulf, the Pope finally sent his legates to consecrate a Great Moravian archbishop and three bishops in 899, thus decreasing the influence of the Bavarian clergy. The only thing we know about them is that the archbishop allowed liturgies to be conducted in Old Church Slavonic again (i.e., as opposed to Latin liturgies) and one of them had his seat in Nitra.

As mentioned above, in 900 the Magyars invaded Transdanubia (a former Great Moravian territory occupied by Franks) and raided Bavaria together with Mojmir’s troops. Eastern Francia was compelled to conclude a peace treaty with Great Moravia in 901 and Mojmir was reconciled with his brother, who is assumed to have returned to Great Moravia about this time. The peace treaty with the Eastern Franks also put an end to wars between Great Moravia and the Frankish vassal Bohemia lasting since 895. When and whether the territory that is now southern Poland seceded from Great Moravia is unknown.

Mojmir II and Svatopluk II probably died in 906.

In 907, the Magyars routed the Bavarian army at the three battles of Bratislava. Mojmir or any name of a successor is not mentioned in connection with these important battles.

After 907 the Great Moravian Empire began to disintegrate. The remnants of the core territory of Great Moravia were divided between the newly established states of Bohemia and the Kingdom of Hungary, and small local rulers continued to rule for some decades in the mountains of what is now Slovakia.

== See also ==
- Menumorut

Preceded by Svatopluk I	Duke of Great Moravia; 894–after 901	Succeeded by unknown (Olgus?)
