= Archbishopric of Moravia =

Ecclesiastical province

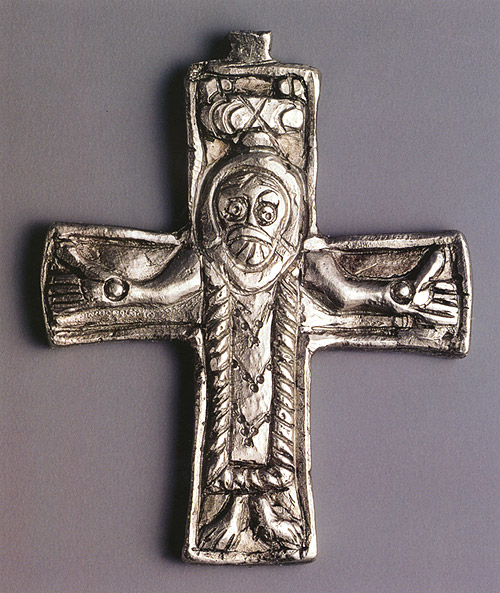
A silver cross from Mikulčice (an important center in Moravia)

The Archbishopric of Moravia (Latin: Sancta Ecclesia Marabensis) was an ecclesiastical province, established by the Holy See to promote Christian missions among the Slavic peoples. Its first archbishop, the Byzantine Methodius, persuaded Pope John VIII to sanction the use of Old Church Slavonic in liturgy. Methodius had been consecrated archbishop of Pannonia by Pope Adrian II at the request of Koceľ, the Slavic ruler of Pannonia in East Francia in 870.

Methodius's appointment was sharply opposed by the Bavarian prelates, especially the Archbishop of Salzburg and the Bishop of Passau, because missionaries from their dioceses had already been active for decades in the territory designated to Methodius, including Pannonia and Moravia. Methodius was soon captured and imprisoned. He was only released in 873 on Pope John VIII's order. He settled in Moravia which emerged as a leading power in Central Europe during the next decade in the reign of Svatopluk. However, most clerics, who had come from East Francia, were hostile to the archbishop, who introduced Byzantine customs and promoted the use of vernacular in liturgy. They accused Methodius of heresy, but he convinced the pope of the orthodoxy of his views. The pope also strengthened Methodius' position, declaring that all clerics in Moravia, including the newly consecrated bishop of Nitra, were to be obedient to Methodius in 880.

Methodius died on 6 April 885. Wiching, Bishop of Nitra, who had always been hostile to the archbishop, expelled his disciples from Moravia. No new archbishop was appointed, and Wiching, who remained the only prelate with a see in Moravia, settled in East Francia in the early 890s. Church hierarchy was only restored in Moravia when the legates of Pope John IX consecrated an archbishop and three bishops around 899. However, the Magyars occupied Moravia in the first decade of the 10th century.

== Origins ==
The Avar Khaganate, the dominant power of Central Europe in the early Middle Ages, had a decisive impact on the neighboring Slavic rulers' way of life. The Avars' power collapsed after the Franks launched military campaigns against the western territories of the Khaganate in the 790s. Charlemagne's son, Pepin held a synod (church council) on Avar territory in 796, to make decisions on several aspects of missionary work in the newly conquered Pannonia. The synod ruled that the local Christians who had been baptised in the name of the Trinity should not be rebaptised in contrast with those who had not received baptism properly.

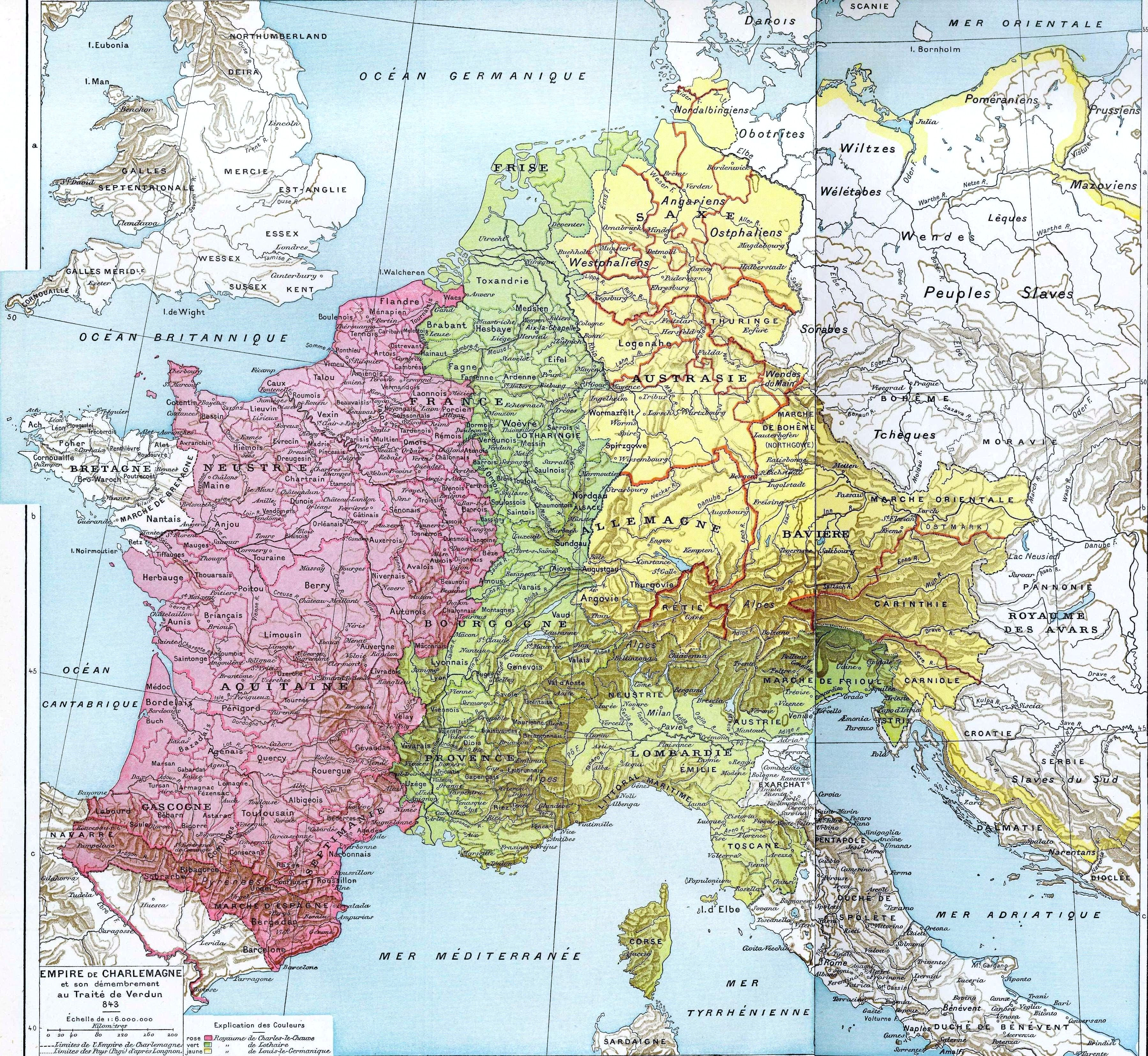
The Carolingian Empire after its partition in accordance with the Treaty of Verdun (843)

Charlemagne divided the newly conquered territory along the river Drava between the Bishopric of Salzburg and the Patriarchate of Aquileia in 796 or 797, with Salzburg receiving the lands to the north of the river. The see of Salzburg became an archbishopric in 798, with five suffragan bishoprics, including the Diocese of Passau. Missionaries from Salzburg were especially active among the Slavs in Carantania; clerics dispatched by the bishops of Passau worked primarily in Moravia.

Adalram, who was archbishop of Salzburg between 821 and 836, consecrated a church for Pribina "on his estate at a place over the Danube called Nitrava", according to the Conversio Bagoariorum et Carantanorum (a report, written around 870, about the missionary activities of clerics from Salzburg). Historians date this event between 828 and 832, but Pribina was only baptised in the Carolingian Empire after Mojmir I of Moravia expelled him from his homeland around 833. Pribina settled in Pannonia where he received extensive domains in the late 830s. He cooperated closely with Liupramm, Archbishop of Salzburg, who consecrated churches for him in Mosaburg, Ptuj, Pécs and other settlements in Pannonia between 850 and 859.

The Notae de episcopis Pateviensibus records that Reginhar, Bishop of Passau, "baptised all Moravians" in 831. However, 21 years later, the prelates in East Francia still considered Moravian Christianity "coarse". The Life of Methodius mentions that "many Christian teachers", or missionaries, came to Moravia "from among the Italians, Greeks and Germans" who taught the local Christians "in various ways". The Life of Constantine the Philosopher emphasizes that the German missionaries "forbade neither the offering of sacrifices according to the ancient custom, nor shameful marriages".

Mojmir I's successor, Rastislav of Moravia, Rastislav's nephew, Svatopluk, and Pribina's son and successor, Koceľ, approached the Holy See to ask for "a teacher" in the early 860s, according to the letter Gloria in excelsis Deo, of dubious authenticity, which was recorded in the Life of Methodius and is attributed to Pope Adrian II. Even if the report of the Slavic princes' request is reliable, they did not receive an answer. Rastislav sent his envoys to the Byzantine Emperor, Michael III, asking him to send missionaries to educate the local priests in Moravia. Rastislav's actions show that he wanted to reduce the influence of the clergy from Salzburg and Passau in his realm.

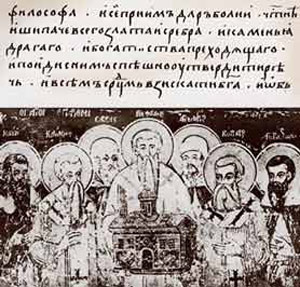
Constantine and Methodius (the would-be Saints Cyril and Methodius) and their disciples

Emperor Michael III dispatched two experienced diplomats and missionaries, Constantine and Methodius—the sons of a military officer from Thessaloniki—to Rastislav's court. The brothers and their retinue arrived in Moravia in 863 and 864. Constantine translated religious texts (first the Gospel of John) to Slavic, using an alphabet he had invented for this purpose. The use of the vernacular enabled the missionaries to accelerate the education of local priests. However, it contradicted trilingualism— the acceptance of Latin, Greek and Hebrew as sacred languages—which was the dominant view in Western Europe.

Three or four years after their arrival, Constantine and Methodius left Moravia to achieve the consecration of their pupils, because they did not know which bishop could ordain priests in Rastislav's realm. During the journey, they spent some time in Pannonia (within the jurisdiction of the Archbishops of Salzburg) and taught the "Slavic letters" to the local ruler, Koceľ, and fifty new students. From Pannonia, they went to Venice where "bishops, priests and monks gathered against [Constantine] like ravens against a falcon", condemning the use of Slavic liturgy, but Constantine defended his case, especially referring to Paul the Apostle's First Epistle to the Corinthians. He stated that the uneducated Slavs could not understand the basic concepts of Christianity if it were presented in a foreign language to them.

After learning of the brothers' activities, Pope Nicholas I summoned them to Rome. He either wanted to prevent them from returning to the Byzantine Empire because of his conflict with Photius, Patriarch of Constantinople, or had decided to take advantage of the brothers' missionary activities to hinder the expansion of the Salzburg see. By the time Constantine and Methodius arrived in Rome in early 867, Pope Nicholas had died, but his successor, Pope Adrian II, sanctioned the use of the books that Constantine had translated to Slavic. Maddalena Betti proposes that the Pope regarded Slavic as a medium of instruction, limiting its use to missionary activities. On the Pope's orders, some pupils of Constantine and Methodius were ordained priests or lectors.

Constantine died in Rome on 14 February 869, urging his brother on his deathbed not to abandon the mission among the Slavs. Koceľ sent his envoys to Rome, asking Pope Adrian II to send Methodius to Pannonia. In the letter Gloria in excelsis Deo, addressed to Rastislav, Svatopluk and Koceľ, the pope informed the three Slavic rulers that he made Methodius papal legate to continue the mission in their realms. The pope also sanctioned the use of Slavic liturgy. Methodius arrived in Pannonia in the summer or autumn of 869.

== History ==
=== Methodius, bishop of Saint Andronicus's see ===
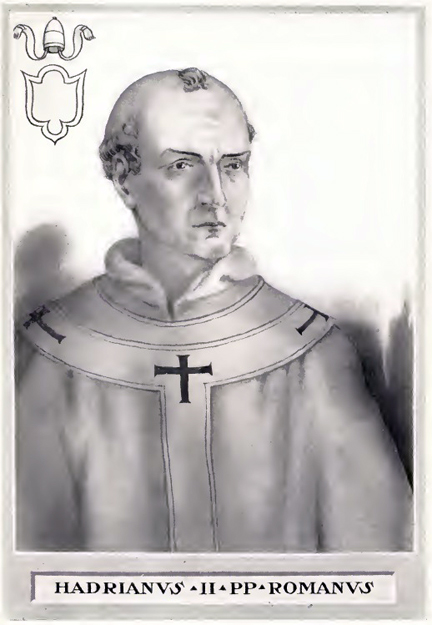
Pope Adrian II, who consecrated Methodius bishop

In response to Koceľ''s demand, Methodius returned to Rome where he was "consecrated to the bishopric of Pannonia, to the seat of Saint Andronicus, an Apostle of the seventy" in early 870. Most historians identify Saint Andronicus's seat with Sirmium (near modern Sremska Mitrovica in Serbia), but no primary sources associate Sirmium with the apostle. If Methodius's see was identical with Sirmium, his appointment shows that the pope wanted to strengthen his authority in the western regions of the Balkan Peninsula, because Sirmium had been the center of the church in the Diocese of Illyricum in the Roman Empire. In the early 870s, papal correspondence referred to Methodius as bishop or archbishop – "a bishop dispatched by the Apostolic See" or "archbishop of Pannonia, apostolic legate", without specifying his see. Methodius was made archbishop but no suffragan bishops were consecrated to serve under him. This was not unprecedented: Saint Boniface had been made "archbishop of Germania province" in a similar way in 732.

Methodius's promotion to bishopric in Rome was recorded in Slavic sources (including his Life and the Encomium to Cyril and Methodius), but it was not mentioned in Pope Adrian's documents. Historian Maddalena Betti says that the absence of Roman sources implies that negotiations over Methodius's appointment between the Holy See and Koceľ were conducted confidentially, because the pope did not want to come into conflict with Louis the German, King of East Francia, who was making attempts to assert his authority over the neighboring Slavic rulers. Although the pope granted Kocel''s request, no papal envoys accompanied Methodius back to Pannonia. Methodius's appointment jeopardized the interests of the Salzburg see, ignoring its jurisdiction in the domains of Koceľ. To defend Salzburg's position, clergymen from the archdiocese compiled the Conversio Bagoariorum et Carantanorum, which emphasized the role of missionaries from Salzburg in the conversion of Bavaria, Carantania and Pannonia around 870. The document refers to Methodius as "a certain Greek", without mentioning his appointment to bishopric.

So, from the time when the people of eastern Pannonia, by order of [Charlemagne], began to be ruled by the bishops of Salzburg, seventy-five years have passed until the present time, during which no bishop, from whatever place, possessed ecclesiastic jurisdiction in that region except the bishop of Salzburg, and no priest from any other place has dared to celebrate his office there for more than three months before he presented his letter of commission to the bishop. This was practiced there until the new teaching of the philosopher Methodius arose.

— Conversio Bagoariorum et Carantanorum (chapter xiv)

Before 14 May 870, Svatopluk captured his uncle, Rastislav, and handed him over to the Franks. Rastislav was sentenced to prison in Regensburg and the Franks occupied his realm. The Life of Methodius describes a debate between Methodius with "all the bishops". The bishops accused him of working illicitly in their territory. Methodius refuted the allegation, stating that he had been authorized by the Pope to work in a territory that the bishops had illegally seized from the Holy See. The bishops "banished Methodius to Swabia" and imprisoned him.

Taking advantage of a rebellion, Svatopluk expelled the Frankish troops from Moravia in 871. Pope John VIII, who succeeded Adrian II on 14 December 872, soon started to search for Methodius. After learning of Methodius's trial, the Pope dispatched his legate, Paul, Bishop of Ancona, to East Francia, demanding Methodius's release in his letters addressed to Louis the German and three Bavarian prelates. The Pope condemned Adalwin, Archbishop of Salzburg for Methodius's expulsion, and Ermanrich, Bishop of Passau for his capture before the trial, suggesting that Methodius had been active in territories claimed by the two prelates. The Pope imposed an interdict on their dioceses, prohibiting the celebration of Mass as long as Method was held in captivity. Pope John also sent letters to Svatopluk, Kocel' and Mutimir of Serbia. In the letters, the pope mentions Methodius's bishopric as the "Diocese of Pannonia" and declared that the three Slavic rulers' realms were included in Method's diocese. According to Maddalena Betti, the designation "has little bearing on the actual geographical context of the Methodian diocese", the pope only wanted to emphasize the right of the Holy See against the Bavarian prelates in the territory.

Methodius was released in May 873. He went to Moravia, because Pope John VIII had asked Svatopluk to defend his interests. Around the same time, the Pope instructed Methodius to read the Epistle and the Gospel in Latin or Greek before repeating it in the vernacular but otherwise supported the use of Slavic in liturgy. Svatopluk and his subjects received Methodius and "entrusted to him all the churches and clergy in all the towns", according to the Life of Methodius. During the next years, as it was emphasized in the Life of Methodius, "the Moravians began to grow and multiply, and the pagans to believe in the true God ... [and] the Province of Moravia began to expand much more into all lands and to defeat its enemies successfully". The expansion of Svatopluk's realm contributed to the growth of Methodius's ecclesiastic province. For instance, Methodius's hagiography mentioned a "very powerful pagan prince" who "settled on the Vistula and began mocking the Christians and doing evil", but Svatopluk invaded his country and forced him to be baptised.

Most clerics in Svatopluk's realm, especially those who had come from Bavaria, remained hostile to Methodius. The Holy See was also informed of their disobedience of the archbishop. They accused Methodius of heresy because he did not use the filioque ("and from the Son") phrase when reciting the Nicene Creed. The Bavarian clerics persuaded Svatopluk to question Methodius's orthodoxy. On Svatopluk's request, Pope John VIII summoned Methodius to Rome to answer the charges.

=== Archdiocese of Moravia ===
Methodius quickly convinced the pope of the orthodoxy of his views in early 880. In June 880, Pope John VIII informed Svatopluk of the validation of Methodius's orthodoxy in an apostolic letter, known as Industriae tuae. The pope also reaffirmed Methodius's position as archbishop and determined the territory of his archbishopric, associating it with Svatopluk's realm. John VIII explicitly declared that all "priests, deacons or clergy of whatever order, whether they be Slavs or any people whatsoever, who reside within the borders" of Svatopluk's realm should be "subject and obedient in all things" to Methodius. He also ordered that the Masses were to be officiated in Latin for Svatopluk if he requested it, but otherwise confirmed the limited use of Slavonic for liturgical purposes.

In the letter, the pope did not mention the Diocese of Pannonia, instead referred to Methodius as the archbishop of the sancta ecclesia Marabensis ("Holy Church of Maraba"). The change in terminology suggests that the Holy See set up a territorially defined archbishopric in Moravia (or "Maraba") on this occasion, according to a widely accepted scholarly theory. In contrast with this view, historian Imre Boba says that the terminology did not change, the new title only reflects the vernacular "Maraba" form of the name of Methodius's see, Sirmium. There is no direct evidence that Sirmium was ever named "Maraba".

Pope John VIII consecrated a Swabian monk, Wiching, bishop of Nitra, ordering that he be obedient to Methodius. In a letter, written about 20 years later, Dietmar I, Archbishop of Salzburg and his suffragans declared that Pope John had ordained Wiching bishop at Svatopluk's request, sending the new bishop "to a newly baptized people whom [Svatopluk] had defeated in war and converted from paganism to Christianity". Pope John VIII also urged Svatopluk to send "another useful priest or deacon" with Methodius's consent to Rome to be consecrated "as bishop to another church, in which [Svatopluk] discern that Episcopal care is needed". The latter text shows that the Holy See acknowledged Svatopluk's right to determine the ecclesiastic administration of his realm, granting him a special privilege, unprecedented in other Christian monarchies outside the Carolingian Empire.

The confirmation of Methodius's position by the pope did not put an end to his conflicts with the German clerics. Wiching even tried to forge documents to convince Svatopluk that the Pope had made him archbishop and forbidden the use of vernacular in liturgy. At Methodius's request, Pope John VIII issued a new apostolic letter to Moravia, reconfirming his previous decisions. Methodius visited Constantinople in 881. After his return in 882, he dedicated himself to the translation of the Bible. However, his conflict with Wiching continued, and Methodius excommunicated his disobedient suffragan. Methodius died on 6 April 885, however, but only after he had nominated his Moravian disciple Gorazd as his successor.

=== Collapse ===
Wiching left for Rome shortly before or just after Methodius's death. He convinced Pope Stephen V that Methodius had disregarded Pope John VIII's orders, persuading the Pope to send a new epistle to Svatopluk. In his letter Quia te zelo, Stephen V prohibited the Slavonic liturgy, endorsed the inclusion of the filioque phrase in the Creed and expressed his disapproval of fasting on Saturdays, which was the customary practise in the Byzantine Church.

Soon after returning to Moravia, Wiching tried to persuade Gorazd, Clement, Angelar and Methodius's other leading disciples to accept the pope's orders. Since they refused to obey, Wiching captured and imprisoned them, and later (before the arrival of a papal legate) expelled them from Moravia with Svatopluk's approval. Naum and some other disciples were sold to Jewish slave-traders who bought them to Venice. However, Wiching was never made archbishop. After he came into conflict with Svatopluk and fled to East Francia between 891 and 893, the church in Moravia was left without a bishop.

Svatopluk died in 894 and his empire started to disintegrate, especially after the Magyars settled in the Carpathian Basin around 895. Svatopluk's son, Mojmir II of Moravia, approached Pope John IX in 898 or 899, asking him to restore church hierarchy in Moravia. The Pope agreed and sent his three legates to Moravia who consecrated an archbishop and three suffragan bishops. Neither the four prelates' names nor their sees were recorded. The Bavarian prelates—Archbishop Dietmar of Salzburg and his suffragans—protested against the papal legates' action.

== See also ==
- History of the Catholic Church
- List of medieval Slavic tribes
- List of the Roman Catholic dioceses of the Czech Republic
- Moravia
- Roman Catholicism in Europe
- Slavic peoples
- Timeline of the Catholic Church

== Sources ==
=== Primary sources ===
- Kantor, Marvin (1983). Medieval Slavic Lives of Saints and Princes (PDF). Ann Arbor: University of Michigan.

=== Secondary sources ===
- Betti, Maddalena (2013). The Making of Christian Moravia (858-882): Papal Power and Political Reality. Leiden-Boston: Brill. ISBN 9789004260085.
- Boba, Imre (1971). Moravia's History Reconsidered: A Reinterpretation of Medieval Sources. Hague: Martinus Nijhoff. ISBN 9789024750412.
- Bowlus, Charles R. (1995). Franks, Moravians, and Magyars: The Struggle for the Middle Danube, 788-907. Philadelphia: University of Pennsylvania Press. ISBN 9780812232769.
- Curta, Florin (2006). Southeastern Europe in the Middle Ages, 500–1250. Cambridge: Cambridge University Press.
- Kirschbaum, Stanislav J. (1995). A History of Slovakia: The Struggle for Survival (1. ed.). Basingstoke: Macmillan. ISBN 9780333620793.
- Sommer, Petr; Třeštík, Dušan; Žemlička, Josef; Opačić, Zoë (2007). "Bohemia and Moravia". Christianization and the Rise of Christian Monarchy: Scandinavia, Central Europe and Rus' c.900–1200 (1. ed.). Cambridge: Cambridge University Press. pp. 214–262. ISBN 9781139468367.
- Škvarna, Dušan; Bartl, Július; Čičaj, Viliam; Kohútova, Mária; Letz, Róbert; Segeš, Vladimír (2002). Slovak History: Chronology & Lexicon. Wauconda: Bolchazy-Carducci Publishers. ISBN 9780865164444.
- Vlasto, Alexis P. (1970). The Entry of the Slavs into Christendom: An Introduction to the Medieval History of the Slavs. Cambridge: Cambridge University Press. ISBN 9780521074599.
