= Liupram =

Liupram (also spelled Liupramm or Liudepram) was the archbishop of Salzburg and abbot of Saint Peter's from 836 until 859.

Before becoming archbishop, Liupram was a fidelis (vassal) holding land in benefice from Louis the German, the king of Bavaria. In the early 830s, he served in Louis's chapel. He was elected to succeed Adalram two days after the latter's death on 6 January 836. He was ordained that year and received the pallium from Pope Gregory IV by a bull dated 31 May 837. He may have owed his promotion to Louis and he was a staunch supporter of the king throughout his episcopate. In 837, he was with Louis during the latter's abortive Italian expedition. In return, Louis confirmed Salzburg's immunity.

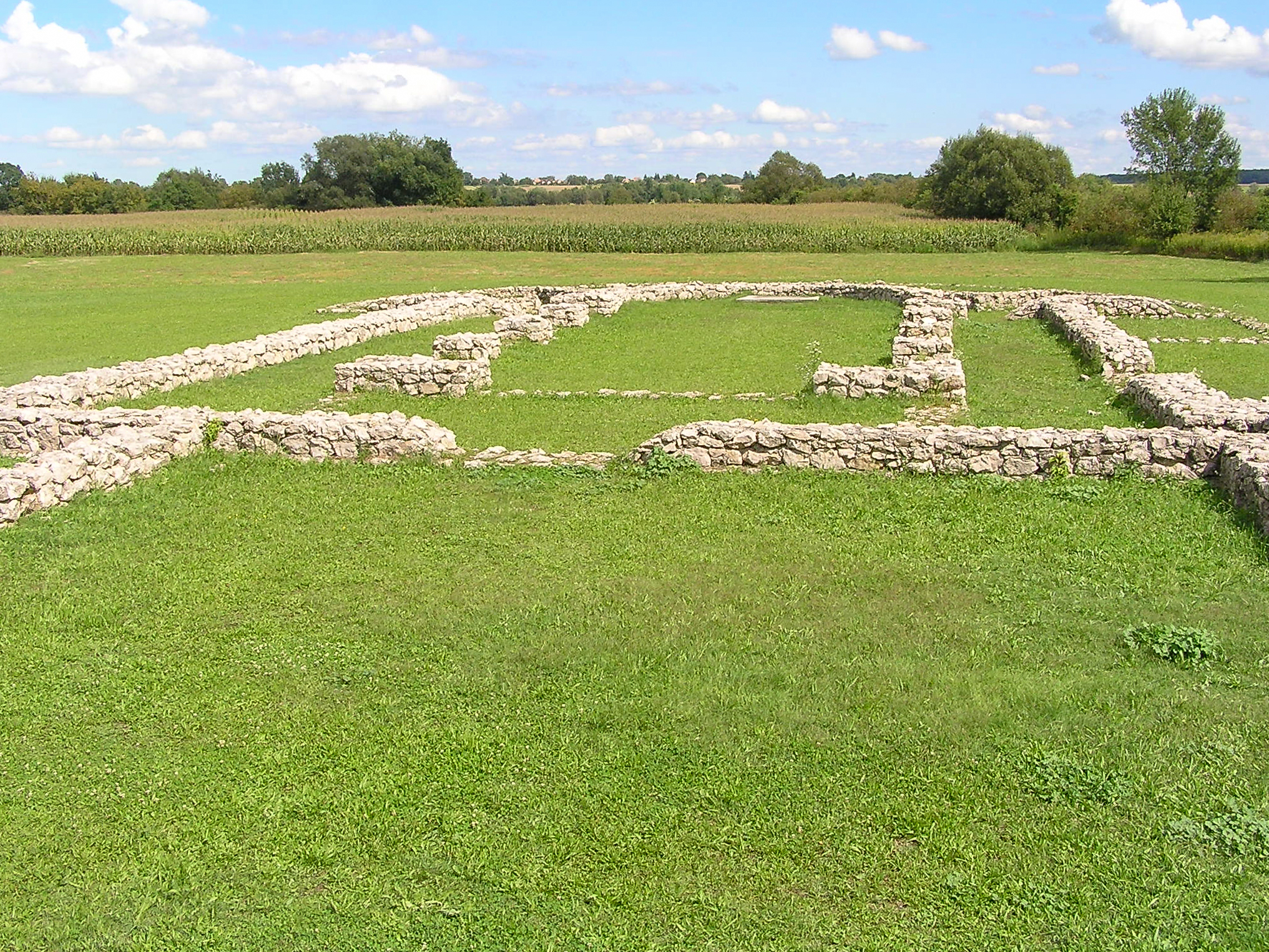
Remains of the Saint Hadrian's church in Zalavár

Liupram was a scholar and church builder. He was also much involved with Pannonian Slavs and churches proliferated in Pannonia under his rule. In 837, the king granted Salzburg land in Slavic territory, including the church at Winklarn that Adalram had built. Sometime before 850, according to the Conversio Bagoariorum et Carantanorum, Liupram consecrated churches as far afield as Ptuj and Pécs at the request of the Slav prince Pribina. On 24 January 850, he consecrated a church in Pribina's capital, Mosaburg (Zalavár), to the Mother of God. Somewhat later, he initiated the construction of another church in Mosaburg, sending master builders from Salzburg. He confirmed Pribina's chaplain, the priest Dominic from the diocese of Regensburg. He appointed a chorbishop named Osbald to serve the Slavs. In 851, with royal permission, he travelled to Rome to acquire the relics of Saint Hermes for Salzburg. An account of his expedition is found in the Translatio sancti Hermetis.

In 852, Liupram attended the synod of Mainz. He died on 14 October 859 and was buried in the cathedral of Salzburg by the altar of Saint Erasmus. He was succeeded by his student Adalwin.

== Bibliography ==
- Airlie, Stuart (2001). "True Teachers and Pious Kings: Salzburg, Louis the German, and Christian Order". In Richard Gameson; Henrietta Leyser (eds.). Belief and Culture in the Middle Ages: Studies Presented to Henry Mayr-Harting. Oxford University Press. pp. 89–105.
- Bowlus, Charles (1995). Franks, Moravians, and Magyars: The Struggle for the Middle Danube, 788–907. University of Pennsylvania Press.
- Fischer, Wilhelm (1916). Personal- und Amtsdaten der Erzbischöfe von Salzburg (798–1519). Richard Poettcke Nachfolger.
- Goldberg, Eric J. (2006). Struggle for Empire: Kingship and Conflict under Louis the German, 817–876. Cornell University Press.
- Szőke, Béla Miklós (2007). "New Findings of the Excavations in Mosaburg/Zalavár (Western Hungary)". In Joachim Henning (ed.). Post-Roman Towns, Trade and Settlement in Europe and Byzantium (PDF). Vol. 1: The Heirs of the Roman West. Walter de Gruyter. pp. 411–428.
- Vlasto, Alexis P. (2009) [1970]. The Entry of the Slavs into Christendom: An Introduction to the Medieval History of the Slavs. Cambridge University Press.
