= Radbod (prefect) =

- Prefect of the Eastern March
- Prefect of the Eastern March: fl. 833–854
- Predecessor: ?
- Successor: Carloman of Bavaria
- Occupation: East Frankish prefect

Radbod (fl. 833–54) was the East Frankish prefect of the Eastern March (marcha orientalis), the Bavarian frontier towards the Slavs, appointed in 833. He had been appointed the office after Louis the German's conquest in 828, and subsequent Christianization of the Moravians (828–33). In 833, according to the Conversio Bagoariorum et Carantanorum, a Slavic prince, Pribina, had been "driven across the Danube by Mojmir, duke of the Moravians", and fled to Radbod in East Francia around 833. Radbod introduced him to King Louis the German, who ordered that Pribina should be "instructed in the faith and baptized", and that he serve with his followers in Radbod's army. Before long, however, Radbod and Pribina fell out, and the latter, fearing for his life, fled with his son Koceľ to the First Bulgarian Empire, and then to Lower Pannonia ruled by a Slavic duke, Ratimir. Since Lower Pannonia was part of Radbod's prefecture, Ratimir's harboring of Pribina was tantamount to rebellion, therefore, in 838, Louis the German sent Radbod at the head of a large Bavarian army to crush Ratimir, but Pribina and his followers took refuge with the count of Carniola, Salacho. In short time the latter brokered a reconciliation between Radbod and Pribina, and Louis solved the ongoing instability by appointing Pribina as his faithful dux with lands in around the Zala river. Radbod held contacts with Rastislav (r. 847–70), ruler of the Moravians (successor to Mojmir), who had long posed a danger to Bavaria. According to the Annals of St-Bertin, in 853 Charles the Bald, king of West Francia, bribed the Bulgarians to ally with the Slavs (apparently the Moravians) and together attack Louis the German's kingdom. In the course of the Bulgarian–Moravian attack, Louis the German deposed Radbod in 854 for infidelity, after an uprising. Radbod then formed a rebel alliance with Rastislav. In 855, Rastislav (Rastiz) rebelled, and Carloman was made prefect in Radbod's place in 856. Carloman's 858 campaign forced Rastislav to make peace.

== Sources ==
- Bowlus, Charles R. (20 January 1995). Franks, Moravians, and Magyars: The Struggle for the Middle Danube, 788-907. University of Pennsylvania Press. ISBN 978-0-8122-3276-9.
- Curta, Florin (31 August 2006). Southeastern Europe in the Middle Ages, 500-1250. Cambridge University Press. ISBN 978-0-521-81539-0.
- Goldberg, Eric Joseph (1 January 2006). Struggle for Empire: Kingship and Conflict Under Louis the German, 817-876. Cornell University Press. ISBN 0-8014-3890-X.
- Reuter, Timothy (1992). The Annals of Fulda: Ninth-century Histories. Manchester University Press. pp. 48–. ISBN 978-0-7190-3458-9.
- McKitterick, Rosamond (1995). The New Cambridge Medieval History. Cambridge University Press. pp. 153–. ISBN 978-0-521-36292-4.
- Pearson, Kathy Lynne Roper (1999). Conflicting Loyalties in Early Medieval Bavaria: A View of Socio-political Interaction, 680-900. Ashgate. ISBN 978-0-7546-0011-4.
- Wolfram, Herwig (1979). Conversio Bagoariorum et Carantanorum: das Weissbuch der Salzburger Kirche über die erfolgreiche Mission in Karantanien und Pannonien. Böhlau. ISBN 978-3-205-08361-0.
