= Ratimir, Duke of Lower Pannonia =

Duke of The Slavs in Lower Pannonia

Ratimir
- Duke of "Lower Pannonia"
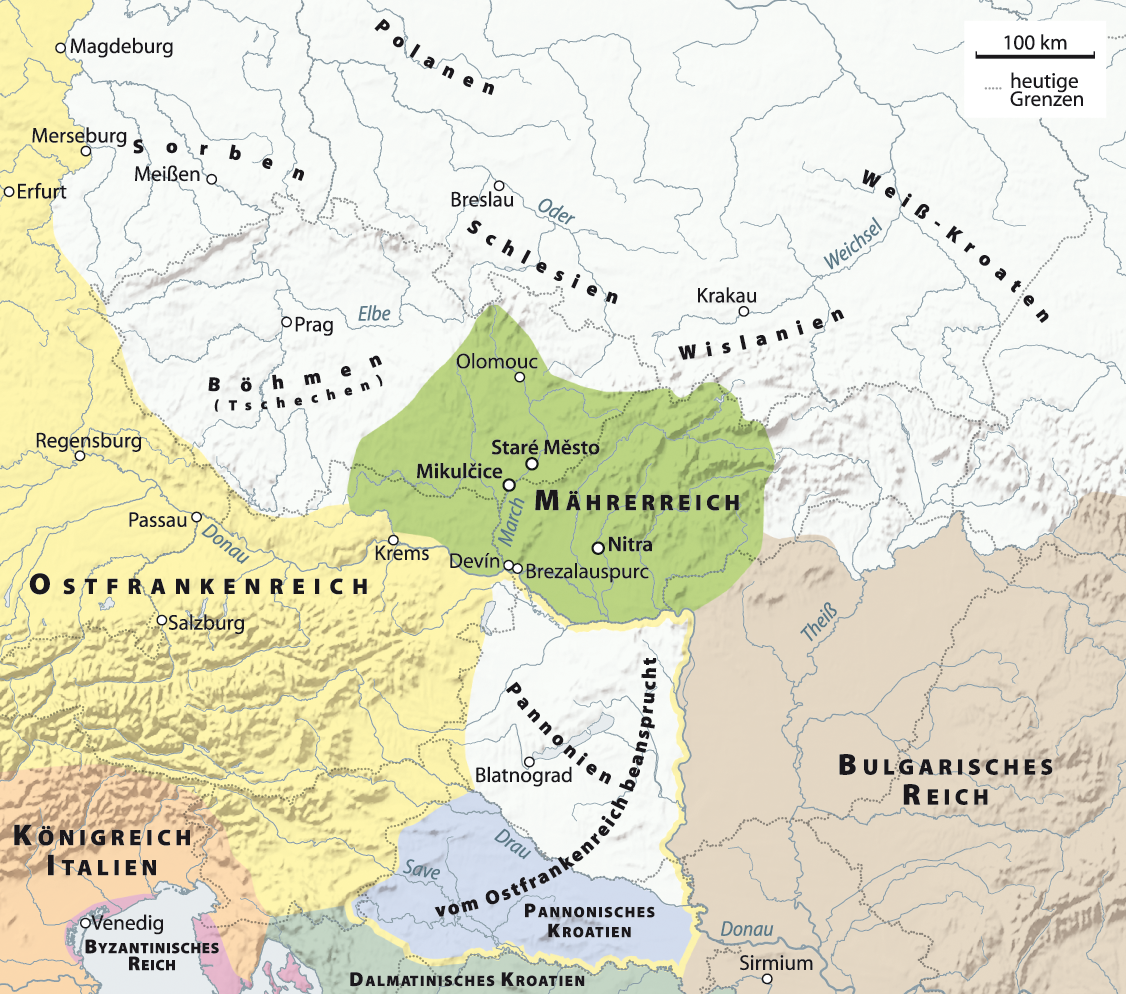
- Map of central Europe (with Pannonisches Kroatien (light blue) at the bottom) during the reign of Ratimir
- Duke: fl. 829–838
- Predecessor: Ljudevit Posavski
- Successor: Braslav
- Occupation: Bulgar vassal

Ratimir (Latin: Ratimarus) was a duke or prince (knez) of the Slavs in Lower Pannonia between ca. 829 to 838. It is believed that Ratimir descends from a royal dynasty that provided rulers for Moravia and Croatia.

In 827, the Bulgars under Great Khan Omurtag invaded and conquered Lower Pannonia and parts of Frankish territories to the north. In 829 the Bulgars imposed a local prince, Ratimir, as the new ruler of the territory. His province is believed to have been the territory of the former Roman Pannonia Savia, which is located in modern-day Croatia. Earlier, Sigismund Calles (1750) called him "Slavic duke of the Drava".

In 838, nine years later, following the Bulgarian conquest of Macedonia, the Danubian count Radbod, prefect of the East March, deposed Ratimir and restored Frankish rule. Ratimir fled the land, and the Franks instated dukes Pribina and Kocelj to rule Pannonian area in the name of the Franks.

Unlike his predecessors, Ratimir experienced a rift in relations with the Christian Byzantine Empire.

According to the South Slavic Chronicle of the Priest of Duklja, rejected by historians, one of Ratimir's descendants was Svatopluk.

== Annotations ==
1. His name is derived from the Slavic words rat ("war") and mir ("peace"). His name is also spelled Ratimar.

== Sources ==
- Luthar, Oto (2008). The Land Between: A History of Slovenia. Peter Lang. pp. 104–. ISBN 978-3-631-57011-1. "From there his path was soon to lead him to the Slavic prince, Ratimir, successor to the rebellious Louis of Lower Pannonia. This meant he was once more on territory controlled by the Franks and under the jurisdiction of Ratbod, the prefect."
- Annales regni Francorum inde ab a. 741 usque ad a. 829, qui dicuntur Annales Laurissenses maiores et Einhardi. Herausgegeben von Friedrich Kurze. XX und 204 S. 8°. 1895. Printed in 1950.
- Rudolf Horvat, History of Croatia I. (from ancient times to year 1657), Zagreb, 1924. (hr.)
- Nada Klaić, History of Croats in Early Middle Ages, Zagreb, 1975. (hr.)
