= Rastislav of Moravia =

Duke of Moravia from 846 to 870

Rastislav
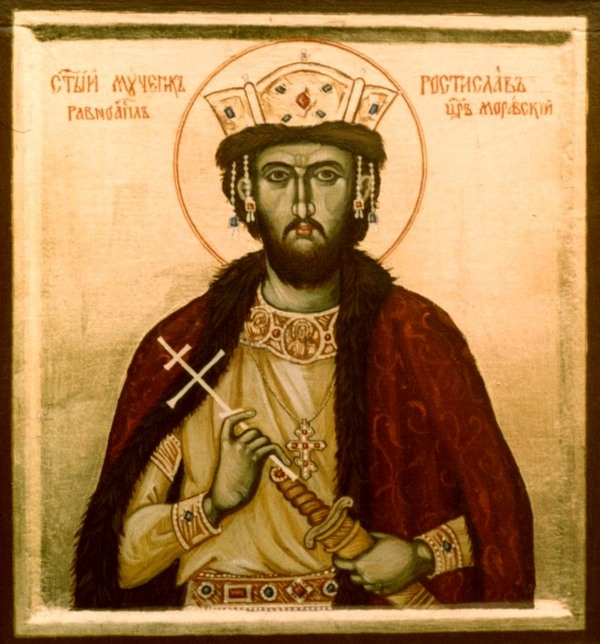
- Rastislav on a modern icon as an Orthodox saint, Slovak National Museum

Duke of Moravia
- Reign: 846–870
- Predecessor: Mojmir I
- Successor: Svatopluk I of Moravia
- Died: Probably 870
- House: House of Mojmír
- Father: Boso-Hosdius (?)

Saint Rastislav of Moravia

Confessor, Equal to the Apostles, Passion bearer
- Born: Central Slovakia
- Died: 870
- Venerated in: Eastern Orthodox Church
- Canonized: October 1994, Prešov by Orthodox Church of the Czech Lands and Slovakia
- Feast: 11 May

Rastislav or Rostislav (Latin: Rastiz; Greek: Ῥασισθλάβος, romanized: Rhasisthlábos) was the second known ruler of Moravia (846–870). Although he started his reign as vassal to Louis the German, the king of East Francia, he consolidated his rule to the extent that after 855 he was able to repel a series of Frankish attacks. Upon his initiative, brothers Cyril and Methodius, sent by the Byzantine Emperor Michael III in 863, translated the most important Christian liturgical books into Slavonic. Rastislav was dethroned by his nephew Svatopluk I of Moravia, who handed him over to the Franks. He was canonized by the Eastern Orthodox Church in 1994 and is also known as Saint Rastislav.

== Early life ==
According to the Annals of Fulda, Rastislav was a nephew of Mojmir I, the first known ruler of Moravia. His career before 846 is unknown, (Note: The Slovak historian Stanislav J. Kirschbaum refers to Rastislav as prince of Nitra in the period before 846 (Kirschbaum 2005, p. 26.; Kirschbaum 2007, pp. xxiv., 207., 238.).) but it is conceivable that he served as a hostage for his uncle at Louis the German's court. The latter invaded Moravia in 846, deprived Mojmir I of his throne, and installed Rastislav as the new duke of Moravia. Rastislav was likely Christian when he became duke, but nonetheless was baptized at the latest in 846 as part of the conditions for his support by the East Frankish king.

== Towards independence ==
In the first eight years of Rastislav's reign there is no report of Moravian rebellion, which suggests that he remained loyal to Louis the German. In this period Rastislav seems to have acquired new territories in the east and established a border with the First Bulgarian Empire. According to the Annals of St-Bertin, in 853 Charles the Bald, king of West Francia, bribed the Bulgarians to ally with the Slavs (apparently the Moravians) and together attack Louis the German's kingdom. In the course of the Bulgarian–Moravian attack, Louis the German deposed his prefect of the Eastland, Radbod, who soon allied with Rastislav. The alliance suggests that, by this time, Rastislav felt secure enough to challenge Frankish overlordship.

In 855 the East Frankish king gathered a large army to invade Moravia. His army, however, foundered before the walls of one of Rastislav's strongholds, perhaps at Mikulčice (now in the Czech Republic) that seems to have been rebuilt in the previous years. Unprepared for a prolonged siege, the king was forced to withdraw from the region. As the king was retreating, his army defeated a large Moravian force that attacked his camp. Nevertheless, Rastislav's army followed the Franks and pillaged many of their estates on the river Danube.

King Louis took an army against the Moravians and their dux, Rastiz, who was rebelling against him, with little success. He returned without victory, preferring for the time being an enemy defended by strong fortifications, as it was said, rather than risk heavy losses to his own soldiers. However, his army plundered and burnt a great part of the province, and annihilated a not inconsiderable enemy force which attempted to storm the royal camp, but not without retaliation; after the king's return Rastiz and his men followed them and devastated the places near to the border across the Danube.

— Annals of Fulda (year 855)

In 856 Louis the German turned over the command of the southeastern marches of his kingdom to his son, Carloman with the responsibility to hold the Moravians in check. According to the Annals of Fulda, Carloman led a new expedition against Rastislav in 858, but this campaign was also a failure, for Rastislav remained defiant. Carloman even struck an alliance with Rastislav against his father.

Karlmann, son of Louis king of Germany, made an alliance with Rastiz, petty king (regulus) of the Wends, and defected from his father. With Rastiz's help he usurped a considerable part of his father's realm, as far as the River Inn.

— Annals of St-Bertin (year 861)

Pribina, the Slavic dux of Lower Pannonia, died fighting the Moravians in 861, which suggests that Carloman also had conceded this province to Rastislav. In response to the ongoing rebellion of his son and Rastislav, Louis the German negotiated a counteralliance with Boris I of Bulgaria. The king made it seem that he was leading a new campaign against Rastislav, but at the last moment he moved against Carloman, who thus had no choice but to surrender.

== Mission of Saints Cyril and Methodius ==
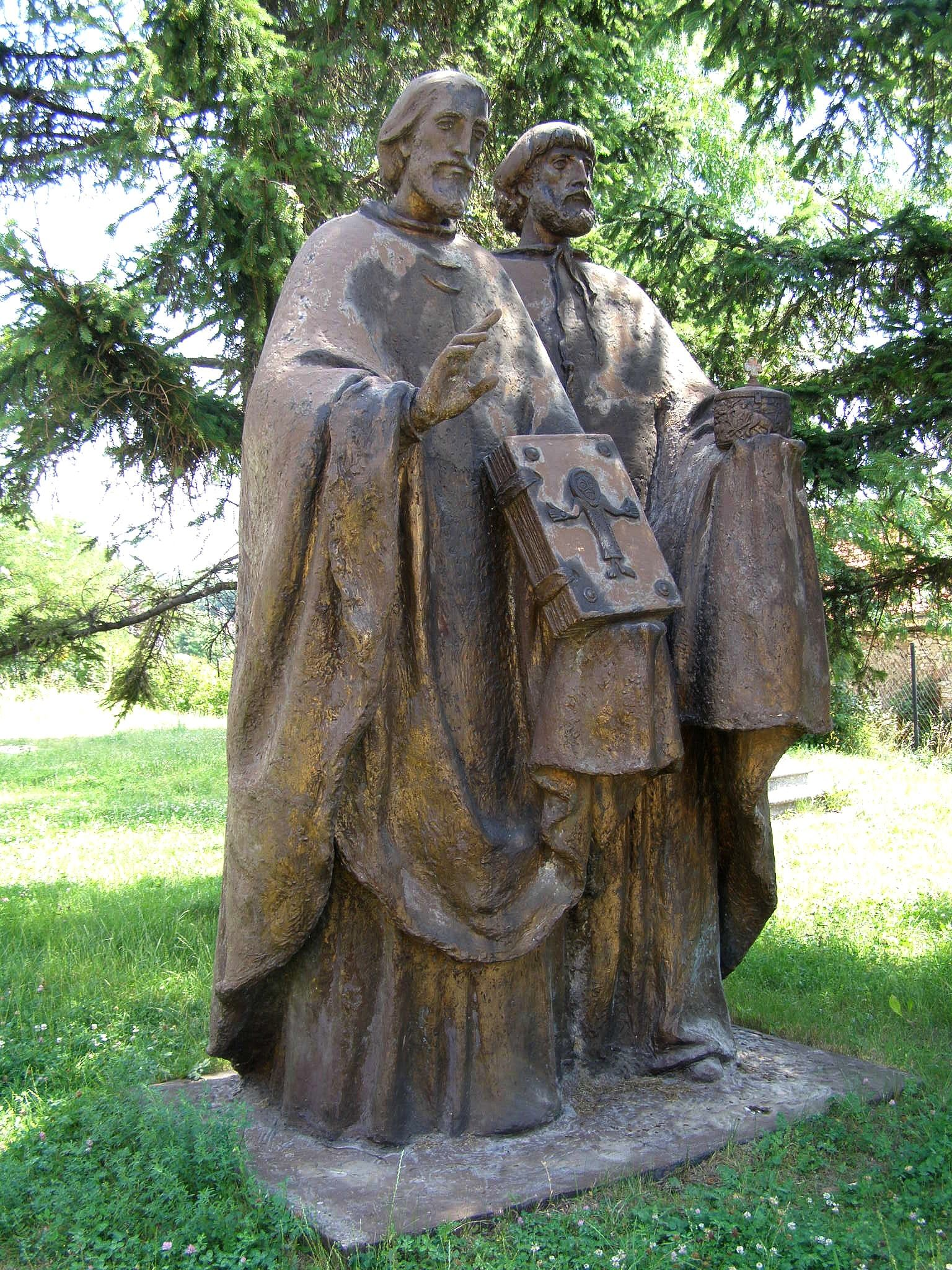
Modern sculpture of Saints Cyril (Constantine) and Methodius

In order to increase his maneuverability, Rastislav attempted to curtail the activities of the Frankish missionaries in his realm. For this purpose, in around 862 he turned first to Rome. Having met with no success, he then asked for "teachers" in Constantinople, in order to educate local Moravians as priests. His embassy also emphasized the need for "teachers" capable of working in Slavic language.

For Rastislav, the Prince of Moravia, through God's admonition, took counsel with his Moravian princes and appealed to Emperor Michael, saying: "Though our people have rejected paganism and observe Christian law, we do not have a teacher who can explain to us in our language the true Christian faith, so that other countries which look to us might emulate us. Therefore, O lord, send us such a bishop and teacher; for from you good law issues to all countries"

— The Life of Cyril

Rastislav's request was granted when Cyril and Methodius, two brothers who had learned the Slavic dialect spoken in Thessaloniki (Greece), arrived with a few disciples in Moravia in 863. The two brothers undertook the task assigned to them by using the Slavonic language for teaching and for divine mass, and Cyril even created a script for the Slavs. The Frankish clergy soon came to realize that the activities of the two Byzantine brothers represented a threat to their influence. As the Byzantine missionaries enjoyed Rastislav's protection, Louis the German dispatched Bishop Solomon of Constance to Rome where he described how the diocese of Passau had been "fragmented and brought to ruin" by the defection of the Moravians.

Louis the German was also planning to launch a major campaign against Rastislav with the support of Boris I of Bulgaria. Although at the last minute the latter pulled out of the campaign, Louis' new expedition against Rastislav was a success. In August 864 Louis the German invaded Moravia, crossing the Danube to besiege the civitas Dowina (identified, although not unanimously, with Devín Castle in Slovakia). The king apparently took Rastislav by surprise, and trapped him within the fortress. Unable to escape the Frankish siege, Rastislav surrendered, turned over a numerous high-ranking hostages and swore a new oath of fidelity.

The king's campaign, however, did not result in the subjugation of Rastislav. In 865, according to the Annals of St-Bertin, Louis the German sent his hosts against the "Wends" (Slavs), and the Annals of Fulda reports for the same year that Werner, a count in Upper Pannonia, was summoned before the king, accused of conspiring with Rastislav. In late 866 Constantine and Methodius departed from Moravia for Venice where the pope's envoys persuaded them to come to Rome. Here Pope Hadrian II approved their Slavic translations of the Scriptures, consecrated their Slavic disciples as priests, and even allowed them to sing the Slavic liturgy in Rome's churches.

== Last years ==
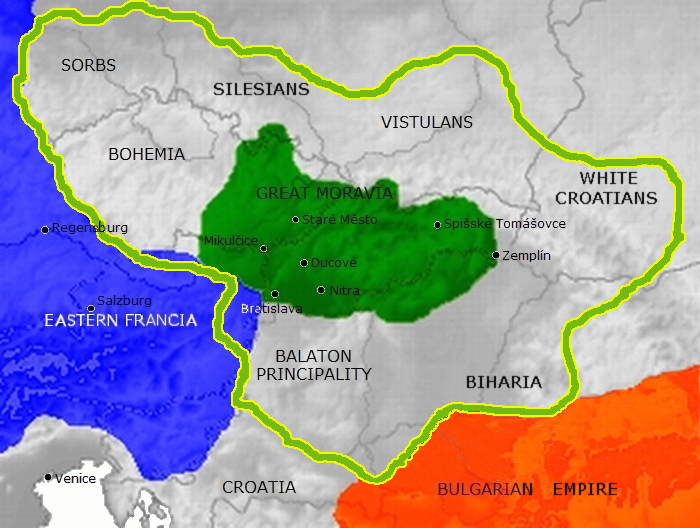
Moravia under Rastislav (in green)

Early in 868 Louis the German's son Carloman fought two successful engagements against Rastislav and returned with plunder. In August the king himself was planning to invade Moravia again, but he suddenly fell ill. Now the king's youngest son, Charles the Fat, advanced on Rastislav's stronghold and burned all of his fortifications, seized treasures, and defeated all who came against him in battle. By that time, according to the Annals of Fulda, Rastislav, who had earlier granted his "old city" to his nephew Svatopluk, ruled from his "indescribable fortress" that might be identified with Mikulčice (Czech Republic). In 869 Pope Hadrian II who had decided to revive the archdiocese of Illyricum consecrated Methodius archbishop of Sirmium (Sremska Mitrovica, Serbia) and papal legate of all the Slavs living in the territories ruled by Rastislav, Svatopluk and Pribina's son, Koceľ.

Svatopluk, in the meantime, entered into negotiations with Carloman without Rastislav's knowledge, and accepted Carloman's lordship over his person and his realm. Rastislav was "beside himself with rage" when he learned of his nephew's betrayal, and arranged for assassins to strangle Svatopluk at a banquet. The latter, however, was warned of the plan and evaded death by pretending to go hawking. When Rastislav set out with his soldiers to hunt down his nephew, Svatopluk captured his uncle and sent him in bonds to Carloman.

Rastislav was dispatched under guard to Regensburg (Louis' capital city) while Carloman invaded Rastislav's realm and subdued all of his fortresses. Louis the German had Rastislav presented to him bound with a heavy chain. While the assembled Franks, Bavarians, and Slavs condemned Rastislav to death for treason, the king commuted his punishment to blinding and imprisonment. Rastislav died in prison. Rastislav was canonised in 1994 by the Czech and Slovak Orthodox Church in Prešov.

/Louis the German/ set around November 1 for Bavaria, where he held a meeting with his men. He ordered Rastiz to be brought before him bound with a heavy chain. Rastiz was condemned, by the judgment of the Franks and Bavarians and Slavs who had come there from various places to bring gifts to the king, to death; but the king only ordered his eyes to be put out.

— Annals of Fulda (year 870)

== See also ==
- Alternative theories of the location of Great Moravia

== Sources ==
- Barford, Paul M. (2001). The Early Slavs: Culture and Society in Early Medieval Eastern Europe. Ithaca: Cornell University Press. ISBN 0801439779.
- Betti, Maddalena (2013). The Making of Christian Moravia (858-882): Papal Power and Political Reality. Leiden-Boston: Brill. ISBN 9789004260085.
- Bowlus, Charles R. (1995). Franks, Moravians, and Magyars: The Struggle for the Middle Danube, 788-907. Philadelphia: University of Pennsylvania Press. ISBN 9780812232769.
- Goldberg, Eric J. (2006). Struggle for Empire: Kingship and Conflict under Louis the German, 817-876. Ithaca, NY: Cornell University Press. ISBN 9780801438905.
- Havlík, Lubomír E. (2013) [1992]. Kronika o Velké Moravě [Chronicle of Great Moravia] (in Czech). Jota. ISBN 978-80-8561-706-1.
- Kantor, Marvin (1983). Medieval Slavic Lives of Saints and Princes. University of Michigan Press. ISBN 0-930042-44-1.
- Kirschbaum, Stanislav J. (2005). A History of Slovakia: The Struggle for Survival. Palgrave. ISBN 1-4039-6929-9.
- Kirschbaum, Stanislav J. (2007). Historical Dictionary of Slovakia. Scarecrow Press, Inc. ISBN 978-0-8108-5535-9.
- Christian, Lübke (2014). "From the Perspective of the East Frankish Empire: Moravia and its Ascent to Power under Prince Rostislav". The Cyril and Methodius Mission and Europe: 1150 Years Since the Arrival of the Thessaloniki Brothers in Great Moravia. Institute of Archaeology of the Academy of Sciences of the Czech Republic. pp. 86–91. ISBN 978-80-86023-51-9. OS LG 2023-08-18.
- Nelson, Janet L. (1991). The Annals of St-Bertin. Manchester: Manchester University Press. ISBN 9780719034251.
- Reuter, Timothy (1992). The Annals of Fulda. Manchester: Manchester University Press. ISBN 9780719034589.
- Reuter, Timothy (2013) [1991]. Germany in the Early Middle Ages c. 800–1056. London and New York: Routledge. ISBN 9781317872399.
- Sommer, Petr; Třeštík, Dušan; Žemlička, Josef; Opačić, Zoë (2007). Bohemia and Moravia. In: Berend, Nora (2007); Christianization and the Rise of Christian Monarchy: Scandinavia, Central Europe and Rus’, c. 900–1200; Cambridge University Press; ISBN 978-0-521-87616-2.
- Spiesz, Anton; Caplovic, Dusan; Bolchazy, Ladislaus J. (2006). Illustrated Slovak History: A Struggle for Sovereignty in Central Europe. Bolchazy-Carducci Publishers, Inc. ISBN 978-0-86516-426-0.
- Vlasto, Alexis P. (1970). The Entry of the Slavs into Christendom: An Introduction to the Medieval History of the Slavs. Cambridge: Cambridge University Press. ISBN 9780521074599.

Preceded by Mojmír I	Duke of the Moravians; 846–870	Succeeded by Svatopluk I
