= Dietmar I (archbishop of Salzburg) =

Archbishop of Salzburg from 873-907

Dietmar I or Thietmar I, commonly spelled Theotmar, was the archbishop of Salzburg from 873 to 907.

== Life ==
Dietmar was a chaplain at the court of King Louis the German. At the time of his appointment to Salzburg, he was a priest of that church. His predecessor, Adalwin, died on 26 August and King Louis moved immediately to Bavaria to arrange the succession, according to the Annals of Salzburg. Dietmar was ordained bishop on 13 September 873 in Regensburg. In early 874, he consecrated a church in Ptuj for the Slavic ruler Chozil.

At the request of King Carloman of Bavaria, he received the pallium from Pope John VIII in November 877. Dietmar was the archchaplain of three successive kings: Carloman (recorded 28 June 877 – 11 August 879), Arnulf (27 November 887 – 2 July 899) and Louis the Child (7 February 900 – 19 March 907). In 899, Arnulf appointed Wiching, formerly bishop in Moravia, to the vacant diocese of Passau. Theotmar objected to the appointment as contrary to canon law and removed Wiching.

Theotmar died fighting against the Hungarians at the battle of Brezalauspurc on 4 July 907. He was buried in Salzburg Cathedral on 21 July.

== Letter ==
Sometime between receiving news of the accession of King Louis the Child on 8 December 899 and the death of Pope John IX in 900, Dietmar wrote a letter to the pope complaining that the latter had sent an archbishop, John, and two bishops, Benedict and Daniel, to Moravia, which was properly under the jurisdiction of the bishop of Passau. The letter is evidence that the papacy still recognized the archbishopric of Moravia.

Dietmar had a low opinion of the Moravian Slavs, describing them as clinging to pagan customs like swearing oaths on dogs. He claims they shaved their heads in alliance with the pagan Hungarians. He compares Mojmir II's pagan ancestry unfavourable with Louis the Child's Christian ancestry. He notes that because the Bavarians could not secure a peace treaty with the Moravians, they were unable to come to Italy's aid when it was invaded by the Hungarians. As a result, he is unable to send his dues to the pope.

The original of Dietmar's letter does not survive, but there are several copies. As the earliest copy is found in a manuscript alongside the Lorcher forgeries of Pilgrim of Passau, the authenticity of the letter has been disputed. Fritz Lošek, its most recent editor, accepts it as genuine. Since it asserts the authority of Salzburg over Passau, it is completely at odds with Pilgrim's forgeries. An English translation has been published.
