= Arno of Salzburg =

Bishop of Salzburg

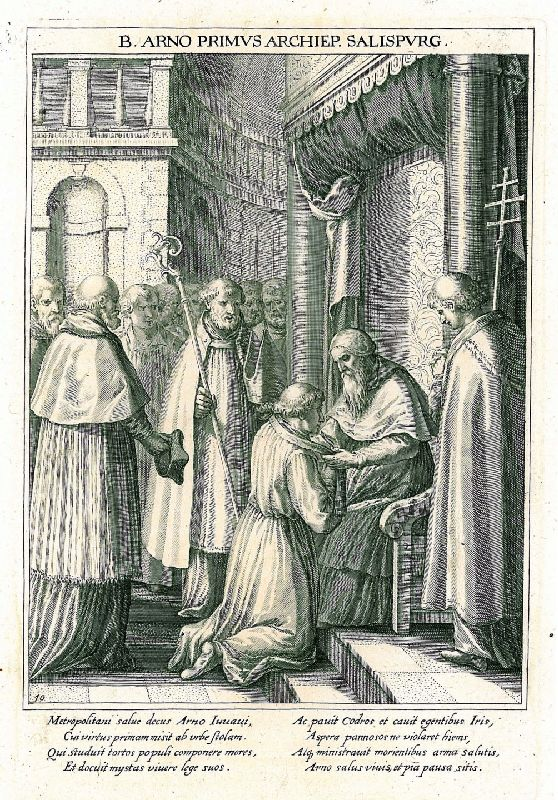
Arno of Salzburg kneels before Pope Leo III in 798 (Egidius Sadeler, ca. 1600)

Arno, Arn or Aquila (c. 750–821) was bishop of Salzburg, and afterwards its first archbishop. He preserved his voluminous correspondence from the scholar Alcuin of York.

== Early years ==
Arno was likely born in the mid-740s to a noble family in southeast Bavaria. He entered the church at an early age, and after passing some time at Weihenstephan Abbey, Freising, became abbot of Elnon, or Saint-Amand Abbey as it was afterwards called, where he made the acquaintance of Alcuin.

== Carolingian Empire ==
In 785 he was made bishop of Salzburg and in 787 was employed by Tassilo III, duke of the Bavarians, as an envoy to Charlemagne at Rome. He appears to have attracted the notice of the Frankish king, through whose influence in 798 Salzburg was made the seat of an archbishopric; and Arno, as the first holder of this office, became metropolitan of Bavaria and received the pallium from Pope Leo III.

After Tassilo's deposition, Arno became one Charlemagne's most trusted servants, continually journeying back and forth between his diocese–made an archdiocese in 798– and the royal court. This new archbishopric turned Bavaria into a distinct ecclessiastical province with Salzburgh at its center. In 788, immediately following the deposition of Duke Tassilo III, Arno commissioned the compilation of the Notitia Arnonis, a detailed inventory of the lands, churches, and rights belonging to the church of Salzburg. Executed by the deacon and monk Benedict from the circle of Arno’s predecessor Virgil, the document recorded direct ducal donations and grants given under the Agilolfings to be secured by Charlemagne.

The area of his authority was extended to the east by the conquests of Charlemagne over the Avars for the Carolingian Empire, and he began to take a prominent part in the government of Bavaria. He acted as one of the missi dominici, and spent some time at the court of Charlemagne, where he was known by the assembled scholars as Aquila, the "Eagle". His name appears as one of the signatories to the emperor's will. He established a library at Salzburg, furthered in other ways the interests of learning, and presided over several synods called to improve the condition of the church in Bavaria.

Arno played a prominent role in key Carolingian synods and in particular political initiatives, leveraging his position as bishop (from 785) and later archbishop (from 798) of Salzburg. He collaborated with Charlemagne and leading clerics at the Aachen assembly of March 802, contributing to the Programmatic Capitulary (MGH Capit. I, no. 33), a comprehensive set of decrees on concerning moral reform and administrative order, which he then enforced as an imperial missus across his archdiocese and beyond over subsequent years. Arno also attended the Paderborn meeting in 799, where he and Archbishop Hildebald of Cologne escorted Pope Leo III into Charlemagne's presence amid the pope's flight from Rome, and he later joined the papal retinue escorting Leo back to the city in November of that year, positioning him near the events culminating in the imperial coronation of 800.

== Later years and books ==
Arno significantly contributed to the development of the Salzburg scriptorium during his tenure as archbishop from 785 to 821, fostering a scribal culture that produced high-quality manuscripts reflective of Carolingian scholarly standards. An elogium composed shortly after his death credits him with commissioning the copying of more than 150 volumes, a figure supported by surviving evidence cataloged by Bernhard Bischoff, which includes works on computus, exegesis, and patristic texts. Notably, Salzburg scribes under Arn's direction created some of the finest illuminated copies of the revised computus prepared at the Aachen court in 809–810.

Soon after the death of Charlemagne in 814, Arno appears to have withdrawn from active life, although he retained his archbishopric until his death on 24 January 821. Aided by a deacon named Benedict, Arno drew up about 788 a catalogue of lands and proprietary rights belonging to the church in Bavaria, under the title of Indiculus or Congestum Arnonis.

Many other works were produced under the protection of Arno, among them a Salzburg consuetudinary, an edition of which appears in Quellen and Erörterungen zur bayerischen und deutschen Geschichte, vol. vii, edited by L. Rockinger (Munich, 1856). It has been suggested by Wilhelm von Giesebrecht that Arno was the author of an early section of the Laurissenses majores, surviving in the copy at Lorsch Abbey, which deals with the history of the Frankish kings from 741 to 829; and of which an edition appears in the Monumenta Germaniae Historica, Scriptores, Band i, pp. 128–131, edited by G. H. Pertz (Hanover, 1826). If this supposition be correct, Arno was the first extant writer to apply the name Deutsch (theodisca) to the German language.

== See also ==
- Arno of Würzburg
- Carolingian art
- Carolingian Renaissance

Catholic Church titles
Preceded by Vergilius	Bishop of Salzburg; 784–821	Succeeded by Adalram
