= Slavs in Lower Pannonia =

Slavic people in the former Roman province

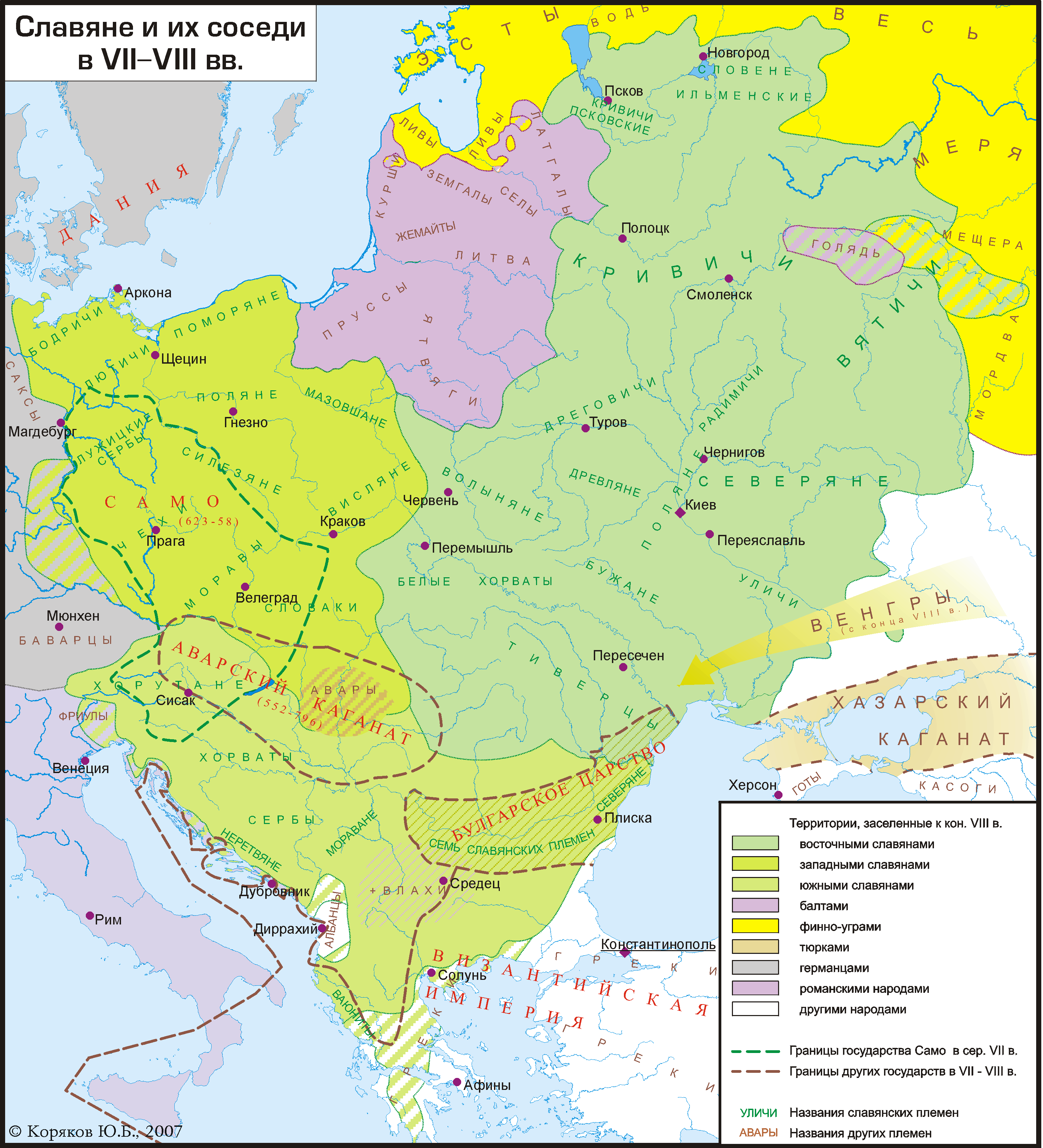
Slavic migration and settlement during the Early Middle Ages, including the region of Pannonia

Early Slavs settled in the eastern and southern parts of the former Roman province of Pannonia. The term Lower Pannonia (Note: Latin: Pannonia inferior, Hungarian: Alsó-pannoniai grófság, Serbo-Croatian: Donja Panonija, Доња Панонија, Slovene: Spodnja Panonija) was used to designate those areas of the Pannonian Plain that lie to the east and south of the river Rába, with the division into Upper and Lower inherited from the Roman terminology.

From the middle of the 6th to the end of the 8th century, the Slavic inhabitants of the region lived under the rule of the Pannonian Avars. By the beginning of the 9th century, after the Avar Wars, the Avar Khaganate was and replaced by the Frankish Empire, which lasted until the Magyar conquest (c. 900).

Within the Frankish administrative system, the March of Pannonia was created. Direct Frankish rule was exercised in Upper Pannonia, while local Slavic princes governed the Principality of Lower Pannonia under Frankish suzerainty. During the 9th century, Frankish domination in Lower Pannonia was also contested by the Bulgarian Empire and Great Moravia.

By the 10th century, the Hungarian conquest of the Carpathian Basin split the Slavs in the region into the West Slavs and the South Slavs.

== Background ==
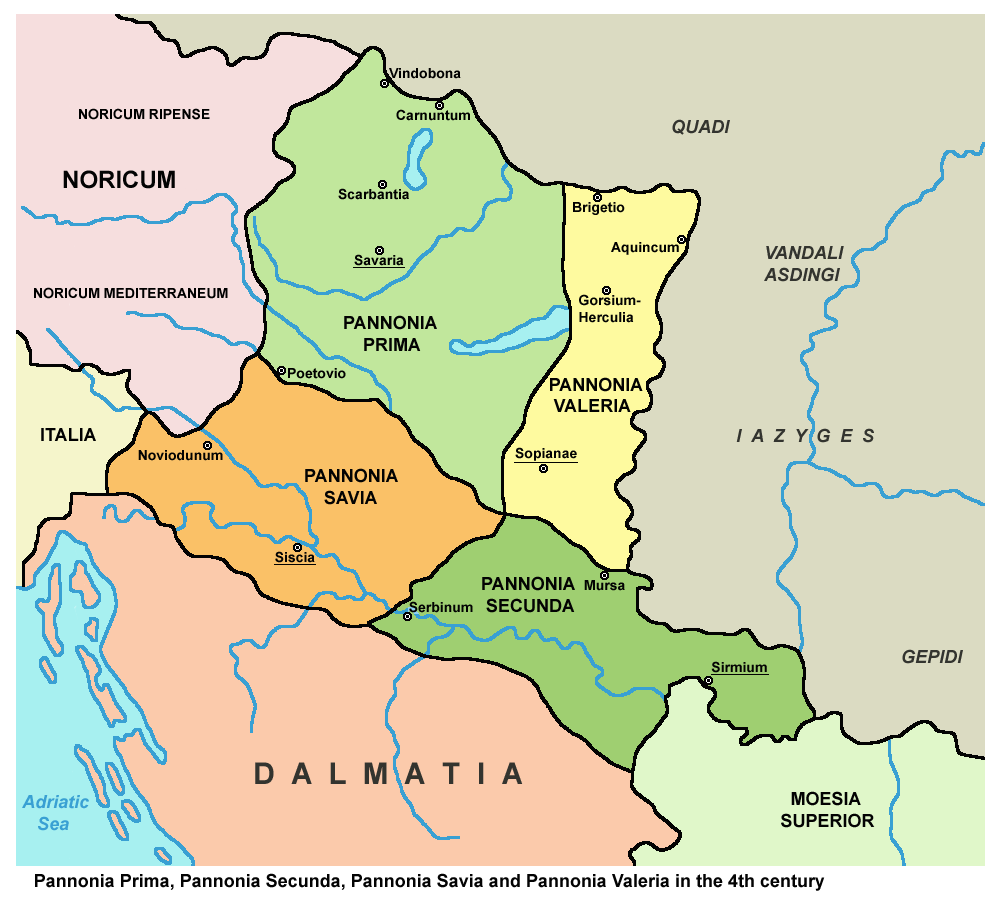
Pannonia was the name of Roman provinces in the area.

Roman rule in Pannonia collapsed during the 5th century, and was replaced by the rules of Huns, Ostrogoths and Lombards. During the reign of Byzantine Emperor Justin II (565–578), and following the Lombard-Gepid War in 567, Avars invaded Pannonia and conquered almost all of the Pannonian Plain. The first indications of the presence of Proto-Slavic groups in Pannonia occur in the 5th century during Hunnic rule. In the 6th and 7th centuries, the inhabitants of Pannonia were certainly Early Slavs. In the mid-9th century, Lower Pannonia was already inhabited by a Slavic majority (besides "Pannonian Slavs" including Dulebes and possibly some Croats), and Christian Avars were also found in Lower Pannonia in 873.

== Principality of Lower Pannonia ==
During the Avar wars, the Royal Frankish Annals mentioned a Wonomyrus Sclavus (Vojnomir the Slav or Zvonomir the Slav) active in 795. Eric, Duke of Friuli, sent Vojnomir with his army into Pannonia, between the Danube and Tisza rivers, where they pillaged the Avars' dominions. The next year the Avars were defeated and Frankish power was extended further east, to the central Danube.

After the destruction of the Avarian state, Pannonian Slavs came under Frankish rule. Initially, local Slavic princes were under Frankish suzerainty, within the March of Pannonia, and some of them are known from Frankish primary sources. Prince Ljudevit was mentioned in the Royal Frankish Annals as Duke of Lower Pannonia (Latin: Liudewiti, ducis Pannoniae inferioris). He led an uprising against the Franks from 811 to 822. The motives for the uprising are unknown, but are presumed to include a desire for greater autonomy. He was joined by the Carantanians, Carniolans, and reportedly by Slavs around Salzburg. Fortunatus II, Patriarch of Grado, supported him. Their combined strength was comparable to the former Avar Khaganate.

Ljudevit's stronghold was in Sisak (Latin: Siscia), former metropolis of ancient Roman province Pannonia Savia. However, the exact boundaries of his principality are uncertain as the term "Lower Pannonian" could have implied both the lands between the river Drava and Sava as well as north of them and east of them in the former Roman province Pannonia Secunda (today's Syrmia). It is possible that his rule extended further east, because historical sources state that the tribe of Timočani who lived around Timok Valley (in today's eastern Serbia) joined him. He rebelled against the military forces of Borna of Dalmatia and the Franks.

After Ljudevit's death and failure of his uprising, in 827 the Bulgars under Great Khan Omurtag invaded and conquered Lower Pannonia and parts of Frankish territories to the north. They also installed their own governors. The Bulgarian-Frankish conflict was probably spurred over the control of the Timočani and Danubian Abodrite tribes. Louis II of Germany made a counterattack in 828, and eventually the March of Friuli was divided into four counties. One of them probably was the early Duchy of Croatia (which also expanded upon the territory of Sisak). Pannonia again became part of the Pannonian March. Both marches were vassals to East Francia. The next year the Bulgars attacked again unsuccessfully, although the territory of Pannonia most probably lost its eastern part to the First Bulgarian Empire.

In 838 Ratimir, a local Slavic prince, emerged as the new ruler of Lower Pannonian regions, around the rivers Drava and Sava. He probably ruled the eastern areas of Pannonia and was a governor of the Bulgarian Empire. Pribina, former prince of the Principality of Nitra, fled to him after being expelled by Mojmir I of Moravia. In the same year Frankish count Radbod of the East March deposed Ratimir and strengthened Frankish rule in Lower Pannonia. Ratimir fled the land, and the Franks instated Slavic prince Pribina as the new ruler of Lower Pannonia. Pribina (d. 861) was succeeded by his son, prince Kocel. During the rules of Pribina and Kocel, the capital of the Principality of Lower Pannonia was Mosapurc (Mosapurc regia civitate), also known in Old Slavonic as Blatnograd (modern Zalavár near Lake Balaton). The polity was a vassal principality of the Frankish Empire, or according to others, a frontier county (Latin: comitatus) of the Eastern Frankish Kingdom. It was initially led by a dux (Pribina) and later by a comes (Kocel) who was titled as "Count of the Slavs" (Latin: Comes de Sclauis). Their authority stretched towards the northwest up to the Rába river and Ptuj, and to the southeast up to the Baranya region and the Danube river. During the time of Kocel, Byzantine missionary Methodius was active in Lower Pannonia. Pope John VIII's letter to a dux Mutimir of uncertain identity, commonly considered to be Mutimir of Serbia is dated to be in this period. The letter concerns the formation of the Diocese of Pannonia with its seat in Sirmium Methodius became the archbishop of the diocese at Kocel's request. (see also Archbishopric of Moravia).

The course of events at the end of the 9th century is unclear. Although Lower Pannonia was still under Frankish influence, Svatopluk I of Moravia emerged as a new threat. Braslav was the last dux of Lower Pannonia between at least 884 and 896. He ruled between the Drava and Sava under the overlordship of Arnulf of Carinthia. He participated in the Frankish–Moravian War, and in 895 or 896 Arnulf handed over Pannonia to him in order to secure the Frankish frontier against a new threat - the Hungarians who had conquered Great Moravia. However, the Hungarians subsequently overran all of the Pannonian Basin.

== Aftermath ==
Following the rise of the Principality of Hungary in the mid 890s, and especially after Battle of Pressburg (907), no further Slavic rulers were recorded in the regions of Lower Pannonia. The Hungarian conquest separated the West Slavs from the South Slavs, influencing the formation of new Slavic identities. Some Moravian Slavs also fled to the Duchy of Croatia. The new border between Croatia and Hungary was apparently north of the town of Sisak, based on a recent archaeological finding of a "knez from Bojna" near Glina. The diocese with its seat in Sisak was offered at the council of Split (928) to bishop Gregory of Nin, which could have only been possible if it was within the borders of the Kingdom of Croatia. In the mid 920s, Tomislav of Croatia expanded his rule to some Lower Pannonian territories, between Sava and Drava, adding them to the Croatian kingdom.

Until the end of the 11th century, its western border was also contested by the Holy Roman Empire,. At the same time, Hungarians and Bulgarians contested for the southeastern Pannonian regions (Syrmia). The borders between the Croatian and Hungarian states in the 10th and 11th century are disputed in modern historiography. Croatian historian Ferdo Šišić and his followers assume that Tomislav of Croatia had ruled most of the area inhabited by Croats, including southern Pannonian regions (Slavonia), while the Hungarian historians Gyula Kristó, Bálint Hóman and János Karácsonyi think that the area between Drava and Sava rivers belonged neither to Croatia nor to Hungary at the time. Nada Klaić stated that she could not preclude this opinion, because the generic name "Slavonia" (lit. the land of the Slavs) may have implied so.

The population of the region grew and churches and administrative organizations were formed, including the diocese of Zagreb (1094). Even after Croatia entered a personal union with the Kingdom of Hungary, Lower Pannonia retained partial autonomy having governor titled as Ban of Slavonia.

== Archaeology ==
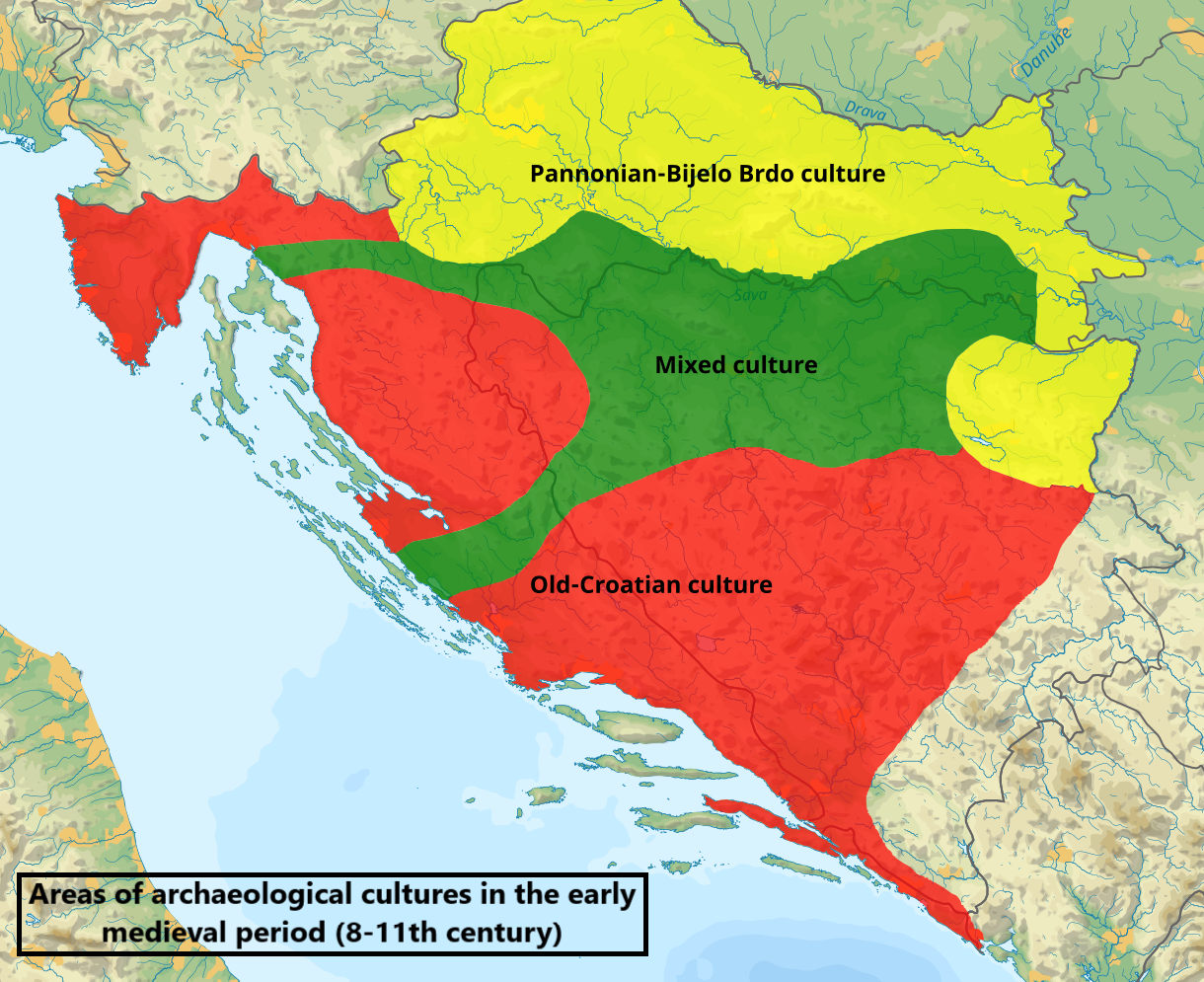
General spread of Old Croatian and Pannonian-Bijelo Brdo culture artifacts during the course of the Early Mediaeval period (per Sokol 1999).

Many cemeteries were found in Lower Pannonia, showing that the region had a large population in the 11th century. The inhumation practices and rituals of the population of Pannonia varied with culture and ethnicity. Even after the Frankish defeat of Avars and the process of Christianization some pagan practices and rituals were retained, such as cemeteries being arranged in rows, feasting at the funeral or steppe burial rites with horses and equipment. Many new settlements were founded around ancient towns. One of them, Sisak, was even the seat of a Christian diocese. The native and mainly sedentary Slavic population assimilated the Avars, forming the Avaro-Slavic Middle-Danube culture. Sedov considered that those Slavs were a mixture of Sclaveni of Prague-Korchak culture and mostly Antes of Penkovka and Ipotesti–Candesti culture, with some Martinovka culture artifacts. According to M. Guštin and L. Bekić, radiocarbon dating confirmed the origin of the artifacts to the late 6th and early 7th century. Although the Pannonian and near Alpine Slavs material culture had features of both Korchak and Penkovka-type, Korchak-type predominates, with parallels in northern Slovenia, Austria and Hungary, indicating migration to northern Croatia through the Moravian Gate between eastern Austria and western Hungary, but not excluding another migration wave from Lower and Middle Danube, upstream of the river Sava and Drava. Later they also assimilated Hungarians, but eventually through the administrative system were linguistically assimilated by the Hungarians themselves. In the 10th century, a so-called Bijelo Brdo culture was formed due to interaction with the Hungarians, located in the area of Middle Danube. In the late 10th and early 11th centuries contacts between Bijelo Brdo, old Croatian-Dalmatian, Carinthian-Köttlach and old Hungarian cultures are observed in modern-day Northern Croatia.

According to the craniometrical measurements and archaeological findings, early Croats did not initially settle in Lower Pannonia and their relationship with Pannonian Slavs was more political rather than ethnic. Others argue that the "Bijelo Brdo and Vukovar cemeteries can hardly be regarded evidence of a pre-Croatian Slavic population in northern Croatia" and they rather "represent a population fleeing the Magyars" during the 10th century".

== Language ==
The primary sources for studying the Pannonian Slavic language are the oldest layer of Slavic loanwords in Hungarian, the Kiev Missal (and possibly the Freising Fragments), and scarce data from toponymy and onomastics. Dialectal features of Slavic varieties spoken in areas bordering modern Hungary are also used in the analysis.

The first linguist to seriously analyze Pannonian Slavic was Eugene Helimski in 1988. He regarded it as a koiné later absorbed by Hungarian as a substratum. Helimski suggests that a dialect continuum between West Slavic and South Slavic existed across Pannonia in the Early Middle Ages. According to Alexei S. Kassian (2024), analysis of the earliest Slavic borrowings in Hungarian clearly shows that the donor language belonged to the West Slavic group.

== In Croatian historiography ==
Contemporary Latin sources referred to the region as Pannonia inferior (Lower Pannonia), and its inhabitants as Slavs or Pannonians. Even after a whole century under Frankish rule, no single gens with a specific identity emerged for the entire population. 19th and 20th century Croatian historiography usually focused on the polity between the rivers Drava and Sava. The polity was referred as Pannonian Croatia (Croatian: Panonska Hrvatska), to emphasiz its Croatian nature, mainly based on De Administrando Imperio (DAI) chapter 30. DAI claims that some of the Dalmatian Croats had moved into Pannonia in the 7th century and ruled over it, and that its duke had amicable relationship with the duke of Croatia. Some modern analyses of sources indicate this was unlikely. According to Croatian historian Hrvoje Gračanin, the traditions and language of the Slavs of southern Pannonia did not differ from those in Dalmatia, so during the periods when Frankish sources did not record a specific ruler of Lower Pannonia, it is possible that the Croatian dukes of Dalmatia, who were also Frankish vassals at the time, extended control over the region. However, the number of Croats in Lower Pannonia "must have been negligible when compared to other Slav(icized) populations", and south–north migration most probably reflects Frankish imposition of Croatian elite from Dalmatia to Lower Pannonia.

The name "Croatia" was not used in contemporary sources, until the late 9th century, but many toponyms deriving from the Croatian ethnonym date as far back as the 11th and 12th centuries. While the term "Croat" was not used in sources about Pannonia, the rulers of the Trpimirović dynasty after Trpimir called themselves the rulers of the Croats and of the Slavs. Since "Pannonian Croatia" politically and ethnically never existed, being a historiographic term, not a historical term, it is no longer used in modern Croatian historiography. The term "Donja Panonija" (Lower Pannonia) is preferred instead.

== Rulers ==
The continuity of Slavic rulers in Lower Pannonia is unclear. They were not part of a ruling dynasty, unlike the rulers of Moravia (House of Mojmir) and of Croatia (House of Trpimir).

Monarch	Reign
Vojnomir	ca. 790–810
Ljudevit	ca. 810–823
Ratimir	ca. 829–838
Pribina	ca. 846–861
Kocel	ca. 861–876
Braslav	ca. 882–896

== See also ==
- Outline of Slavic history and culture

== Annotations ==
1. There exist different interpretations about the identity of dux Mutimir as in the same time lived two or three personalities with the same or similar name: Mutimir of Serbia (c. 850–891), Muncimir of Croatia (c. 892–910) and possibly unknown Mutimir who ruled in the region of Syrmia as a vassal of the First Bulgarian Empire.

== Sources ==
- Barford, Paul M. (2001). The Early Slavs: Culture and Society in Early Medieval Eastern Europe. Ithaca: Cornell University Press. ISBN 0801439779.
- Barker, John W. (1966). Justinian and the Later Roman Empire. Madison: University of Wisconsin Press. ISBN 9780299039448.
- Betti, Maddalena (2013). The Making of Christian Moravia (858-882): Papal Power and Political Reality. Leiden-Boston: Brill. ISBN 9789004260085.
- Bowlus, Charles R. (1995). Franks, Moravians, and Magyars: The Struggle for the Middle Danube, 788-907. Philadelphia: University of Pennsylvania Press. ISBN 9780812232769.
- Budak, Neven (2018). Hrvatska povijest od 550. do 1100 [Croatian history from 550 until 1100] (in Croatian). Leykam international. ISBN 978-953-340-061-7.
- Curta, Florin (2006). Southeastern Europe in the Middle Ages, 500–1250. Cambridge: Cambridge University Press.
- Filipec, Krešimir (2015). Donja Panonija od 9. do 11. stoljeća [Lower Pannonia from 9th until 11th century] (in Croatian). University of Sarajevo. ISBN 978-9958-600-68-5.
- Fine, John Van Antwerp Jr. (1991) [1983]. The Early Medieval Balkans: A Critical Survey from the Sixth to the Late Twelfth Century. Ann Arbor, Michigan: University of Michigan Press. ISBN 0472081497.
- Fine, John Van Antwerp Jr. (2005). When Ethnicity did not Matter in the Balkans: A Study of Identity in Pre-Nationalist Croatia, Dalmatia, and Slavonia in the Medieval and Early-Modern Periods. Ann Arbor, Michigan: University of Michigan Press. ISBN 0472025600.
- Goldberg, Eric J. (2006). Struggle for Empire: Kingship and Conflict under Louis the German, 817-876. Ithaca, NY: Cornell University Press. ISBN 9780801438905.
- Goldstein, Ivo (1984). "Ponovno o Srbima u Hrvatskoj u 9. stoljeću" (PDF). Historijski zbornik (in Croatian). 37: 235–246.
- Gračanin, Hrvoje (2008a). "Od Hrvata pak koji su stigli u Dalmaciju odvojio se jedan dio i zavladao Ilirikom i Panonijom: Razmatranja uz DAI c. 30, 75-78". Povijest U Nastavi (in Croatian). 6 (11): 67–76.
- Gračanin, Hrvoje (2008b). "Slaveni u ranosrednjovjekovnoj južnoj Panoniji" [Slavs in the Early Medieval South Pannonia]. Scrinia Slavonica (8): 13–54.
- Gračanin, Hrvoje; Bilogrivić, Goran (2016). "Siscia in Late Antiquity and the Early Middle Ages: Fate of a Post-Roman Town in Southern Pannonia". Acta Archaeologica Carpathica. LI: 103–143.
- Gračanin, Hrvoje (2021). "Constantine VII Porphyrogennetos on Croats in Early Medieval Southern Pannonia (DAI, c. 30, 75–78): A Note on Concept and Method of Byzantine History Writing". Vestnik Volgogradskogo gosudarstvennogo universiteta Serija 4 Istorija Regionovedenie Mezhdunarodnye otnoshenija. 25 (6): 24–43. doi:10.15688/jvolsu4.2020.6.2.
- Guštin, Mitja (2007). "Rani srednji vijek od alpskih obronaka do Panonije" [The Early Middle Ages from the Alpine Slopes to Pannonia]. Prilozi Instituta Za Arheologiju U Zagrebu (in Croatian and English). 24: 289–300.
- Kantor, Marvin (1983). Medieval Slavic Lives of Saints and Princes. Ann Arbor: The University of Michigan Press. ISBN 9780930042448.
- Luthar, Oto, ed. (2008). The Land Between: A History of Slovenia. Frankfurt am Main: Peter Lang. ISBN 9783631570111.
- MacLean, Simon (2003). Kingship and Politics in the Late Ninth Century: Charles the Fat and the End of the Carolingian Empire. Cambridge: Cambridge University Press. ISBN 9781139440295.
- MacLean, Simon (2009). History and Politics in Late Carolingian and Ottonian Europe: The Chronicle of Regino of Prüm and Adalbert of Magdeburg. Manchester and New York: Manchester University Press. ISBN 9780719071348.
- Moravcsik, Gyula, ed. (1967) [1949]. Constantine Porphyrogenitus: De Administrando Imperio (2nd revised ed.). Washington D.C.: Dumbarton Oaks Center for Byzantine Studies. ISBN 9780884020219.
- Nelson, Janet L. (1991). The Annals of St-Bertin. Manchester: Manchester University Press. ISBN 9780719034251.
- Pertz, Georg Heinrich, ed. (1845). Einhardi Annales. Hanover.
- Petković, Danijel (2006). "Hrvatsko ime u srednjovjekovnoj Slavoniji prema nekoliko primjera u diplomatičkim izvorima od 13. do 15. stoljeća" [Croatian name in medieval Slavonia according to several examples in diplomatic sources from the 13th to the 15th century]. Starohrvatska Prosvjeta (in Croatian). III (33): 243–281.
- Richards, Ronald O. (2003). The Pannonian Slavic Dialect of the Common Slavic Proto-language: The View from Old Hungarian. Los Angeles: University of California. ISBN 9780974265308.
- Reuter, Timothy (1992). The Annals of Fulda. Manchester: Manchester University Press. ISBN 9780719034589.
- Scholz, Bernhard Walter, ed. (1970). Carolingian Chronicles: Royal Frankish Annals and Nithard's Histories. University of Michigan Press. ISBN 0472061860.
- Sedov, Valentin Vasilyevich (2013) [1995]. "Panonski Slaveni" [Pannonian Slavs]. Славяне в раннем Средневековье [Sloveni u ranom srednjem veku (Slavs in Early Middle Ages)]. Novi Sad: Akademska knjiga. pp. 413–427. ISBN 978-86-6263-026-1.
- Škvarna, Dušan (2002). Slovak History: Chronology & Lexicon. Wauconda: Bolchazy-Carducci Publishers. ISBN 978-0-86516-444-4.
- Štih, Peter (2010). The Middle Ages between the Eastern Alps and the Northern Adriatic: Select Papers on Slovene Historiography and Medieval History. Leiden-Boston: Brill. ISBN 9789004187702.
- Szőke, Béla Miklós (2007). "New findings of the excavations in Mosaburg/Zalavár (Western Hungary)". Post-Roman Towns, Trade and Settlement in Europe and Byzantium: The heirs of the Roman West (PDF). Berlin-New York: Walter de Gruyter. pp. 411–428.
- Tomičić, Željko (2017). "O problemu navodnog ranosrednjovjekovnog groblja u Šenkovcu u Međimurju" [On the issue of the Alleged Early-Mediaeval Cemetery of Šenkovec in Međimurje]. Rad Hrvatske Akademije Znanosti i Umjetnosti. Razred za Društvene Znanosti (in Croatian). 529 (529=52): 123–156. doi:10.21857/ygjwrc672y.
- Vlasto, Alexis P. (1970). The Entry of the Slavs into Christendom: An Introduction to the Medieval History of the Slavs. Cambridge: Cambridge University Press. ISBN 9780521074599.
