= Frankish–Moravian wars =

9th-century wars

Frankish–Moravian War
Date	882–884, 891
Location	Pannonia
Result	Peace

Belligerents
East Francia: March of Carinthia	Duchy of Moravia

Commanders and leaders
Arnulf of Carinthia; Braslav	Svatopluk I of Moravia

In 882–84, a bloody war was fought between Arnulf of Carinthia and Svatopluk I of Moravia, during which Pannonia and the Danube suffered the most. Svatopluk is said to have "slaughtered" and "destroyed much with fire and sword". The two sides reached an agreement on peace in 884 at Tulln.

Sometime during 891, according to the Annals of Fulda, Arnulf sent an embassy led by margrave Arbo to Moravia in order to renew the peace. A letter written by the margrave soon announced that the legates were returning from Svatopluk and the Moravians who had agreed "to give themselves in friendship". Svatopluk, however, broke his pledges, thus Arnulf decided to invade Moravia in 891. First Arnulf met with Braslav, the Slavic dux on the river Sava, next raised an army of Franconians, Bavarians and Alamanni, and also recruited Hungarians to join his campaign (for the latter recruitment, Ottonian authors blamed Arnulf for unleashing the Hungarians on Europe).
