= Braslav, Duke of Lower Pannonia =

Prince of The Slavs in Lower Pannonia

Braslav
- Duke of Lower Pannonia
- Reign: fl. 882–896

Braslav (fl. 882–896) was a prince who ruled the Slavs in Lower Pannonia, in a territory located mostly in modern-day Croatia, between 884 and 896 as a vassal of Arnulf of Carinthia. He participated in the Frankish–Moravian War (882–884) and the Frankish invasion of Moravia (891–892). He was last mentioned when he was entrusted Pannonia by Arnulf in order to secure the Frankish frontier against the Hungarians (896), who subsequently overran all of Pannonia and continued into Italy.

== Background ==
In 882–884, a bloody war was fought between Arnulf of Carinthia and Svatopluk I of Moravia. The two agreed on peace in 884.

== Life ==
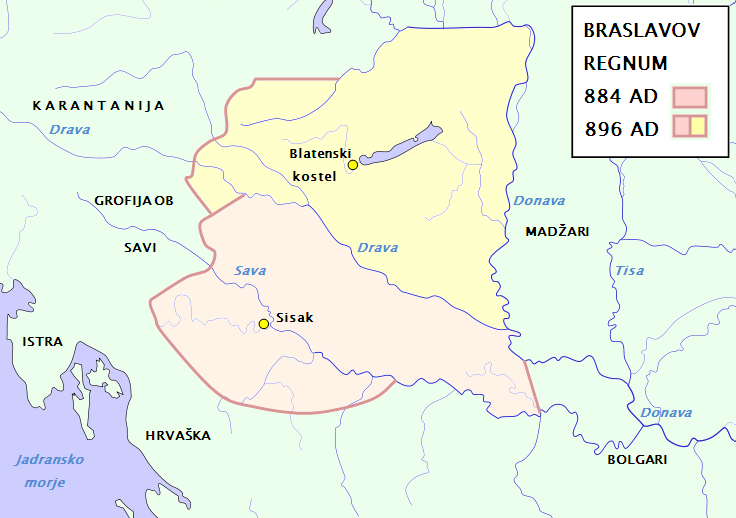
Territory governed by Braslav

A Slavic prince and ardent Frankish loyalist, according to the Frankish Annals, Braslav was the "Duke of Lower Pannonia" (Pannonia inferior cum duce Braslao ad officium rediit). He ruled a province from the Drava to the Sava (modern-day Slavonia). He took part in the 884 Frankish–Moravian peace treaty reached at Tulln.

Sometime during 891, according to the Annals of Fulda, Arnulf sent an embassy led by margrave Arbo to Moravia in order to renew the peace. A letter written by the margrave soon announced that the legates were returning from Svatopluk and the Moravians who had agreed "to give themselves in friendship". Svatopluk, however, broke his pledges, thus Arnulf decided to invade Moravia in 891. First Arnulf met with Braslav, the Slavic dux on the river Sava, next raised an army of Franconians, Bavarians and Alamanni, and also recruited Hungarians to join his campaign (for the latter recruitment, Ottonian authors blamed Arnulf for unleashing the Hungarians on Europe). Braslav participated in the 892 campaign.

After Svatopluk's death in 894, the Hungarians ravaged Pannonia, becoming enemies of Arnulf, threatening Frankish Pannonia. The critical situation came after the Hungarians had occupied the Pannonian basin between the Tisza and Danube. Thus, in 895 or 896, Arnulf entrusted Mosapurc (modern Zalavár, Hungary) and Pannonia to Braslav, thereby strengthening the defense of his southeastern frontier. Arnulf and Braslav could not stop the Hungarians, and Pannonia was subsequently overrun by the Hungarians. Braslav was last mentioned in a source dating to 898, at which time the Hungarians with a great army had breached into Italy for the first time, having crossed the Slavic lands.

== Legacy ==
He also undertook a pilgrimage to Cividale as his name is found in the Evangelistary of Cividale together with the name of his wife Ventescela.

Bratislava, the capital of Slovakia, has been theorized as having been named after Braslav (Brezalauspurc, 907).

There are references to Braslav as a Croatian duke in modern Croatian historiography.
