= Adalram =

9th-century prelate active in Bavaria

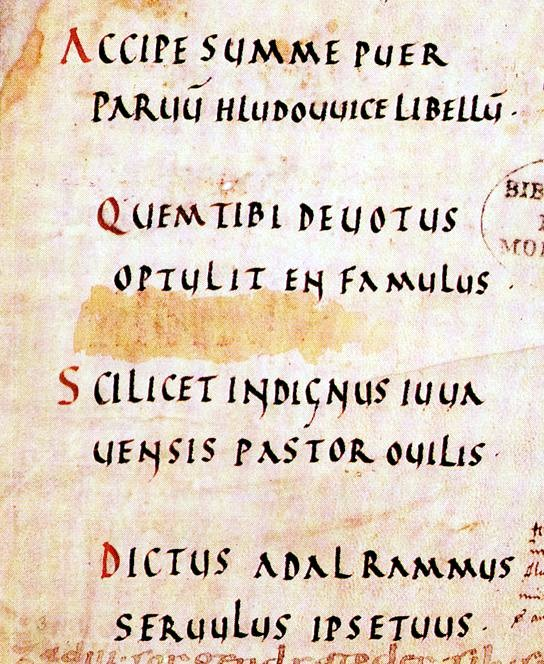
Adalram's dedication in the "Muspilli manuscript" (Note: Accipe, summe puer, paruum, Hludowice, libellum, / Quem tibi deuotus optulit, en, famulus / Scilicet indignus Iuvavensis pastor ouilis, / Dictus Adalrammus, seruulus ipse tuus ("Receive, o Hludowic, mighty young lad, the little book that [your] devoted household priest, behold, offers you; know that the unworthy shepherd of the Salzburg flock known as Adalram is your own lowly servant"))

Adalram (died 836) was an early 9th-century prelate active in Bavaria. He is known to have been archdeacon of the Salzburg diocese c. 819, and in 821 succeeded Arno as Archbishop of Salzburg. In 824, following the request of the emperor Louis the Pious, he received the pallium from Pope Eugenius II.

As archbishop he continued the attempts to evangelize the Slavs of Upper Pannonia and Carantania, appointing Otto as under-bishop to the Slavs. During his episcopate the church of Nitra in Pannonia (in what is now Slovakia) was dedicated at his instigation. The ruler Pribina had recently taken a Bavarian Christian wife, and this church may have been for her use. He is thought to have died on 4 January 836.

He is associated with the production of many manuscripts, including Bayerische Staatsbibliothek, Clm 15817 which contains several works of St Augustine and the earliest surviving version of the Anonymous Life of St Cuthbert. Another manuscript with Augustinian materials, Clm 14098, was presented by Adalram to the Louis the German, duke of Bavaria.

== Notes ==
Titles of Chalcedonian Christianity
Preceded by Arno	Archbishop of Salzburg; 821–836	Succeeded by Liupram
