= Zalavár =

- Village
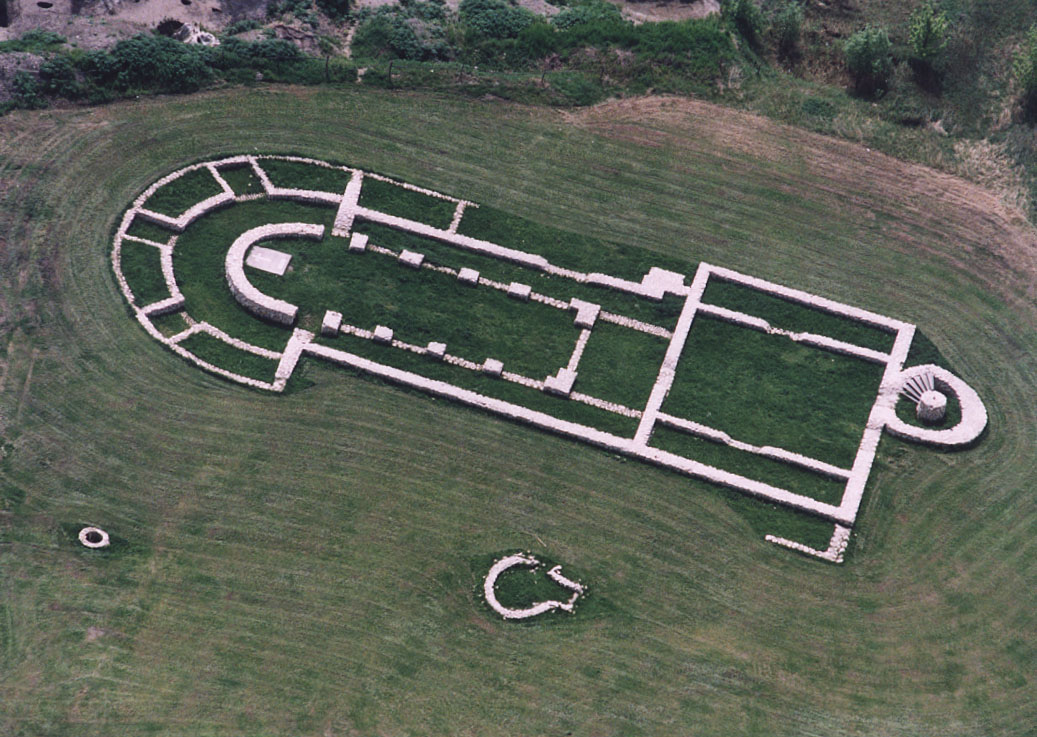
- Remains of the Romanesque basilica in Zalavár

- Flag Coat of arms

- Location of Zalavár
- Coordinates: 46.66996°N 17.15683°E
- Country: Hungary
- Region: Western Transdanubia
- County: Zala
- District: Keszthely

Area
  - Total: 31.06 km^{2} (11.99 sq mi)

Population (1 January 2026)
  - Total: 851
  - Density: 27.4/km^{2} (71.0/sq mi)
- Time zone: UTC+1 (CET)
  - Summer (DST): UTC+2 (CEST)
- Postal code: 8392
- Area code: (+36) 83
- Website: www.zalavar.hu

Zalavár (Hungarian pronunciation: [ˈzɒlɒvaːr]) is a village in south-western Hungary, located in Zala County. It is located around 9 km (6 mi) southwest of Lake Balaton.

== Name ==
According to written sources the settlement was called 'Mosapurc' in the 9th century, "Mosapurc regia civitate". It was also known as Moosburg, Urbs Paludarum, Braslavespurch and Blatengrad in medieval records. The medieval settlement is known in modern sources as Blatnohrad (Slovak), Blatnograd, Блатноград (Serbo-Croatian and Bulgarian). Ján Kollár called it Salavár in his travel book and described the state of the ruins in 1841.

== History ==
In the 9th century, Mosapurc or Moosburg was a fortified settlement built along the Zala river and was the capital of the Frankish vassal Lower Pannonian Principality ruled by a Slavic prince Pribina ("Privinae civitas, munimen, castrum in nemore et palude Salae" in a Salzburg chronicle). During the reign of Pribina's son, prince Kocel (861–876), in the summer of 867, it provided short-term hospitality to brothers Cyril and Methodius on their way from Great Moravia to the pope in Rome to justify the use of the Slavonic language as a liturgical language. They and their disciples turned Blatnograd into one of the centers that spread the knowledge of the new Slavonic script (Glagolitic alphabet) and literature, educating numerous future missionaries in their native language.

=== Battle of Pressburg ===
It is claimed that Urbs Paludarum, Brazlavo's burg (Moosburg), was the site of the Battle of Pressburg, instead of Bratislava. The only contemporary source mentioning a location of the battle is the Annales iuvavenses maximi (Annals of Salzburg); however, the reliability of these annals is questionable, as they survive only in fragments copied in the 12th century. According to the annals, the battle took place in the vicinity of Brezalauspurc, the castle of Duke Brazlavo (Braslav), located west of Lake Balaton.

== Gallery ==
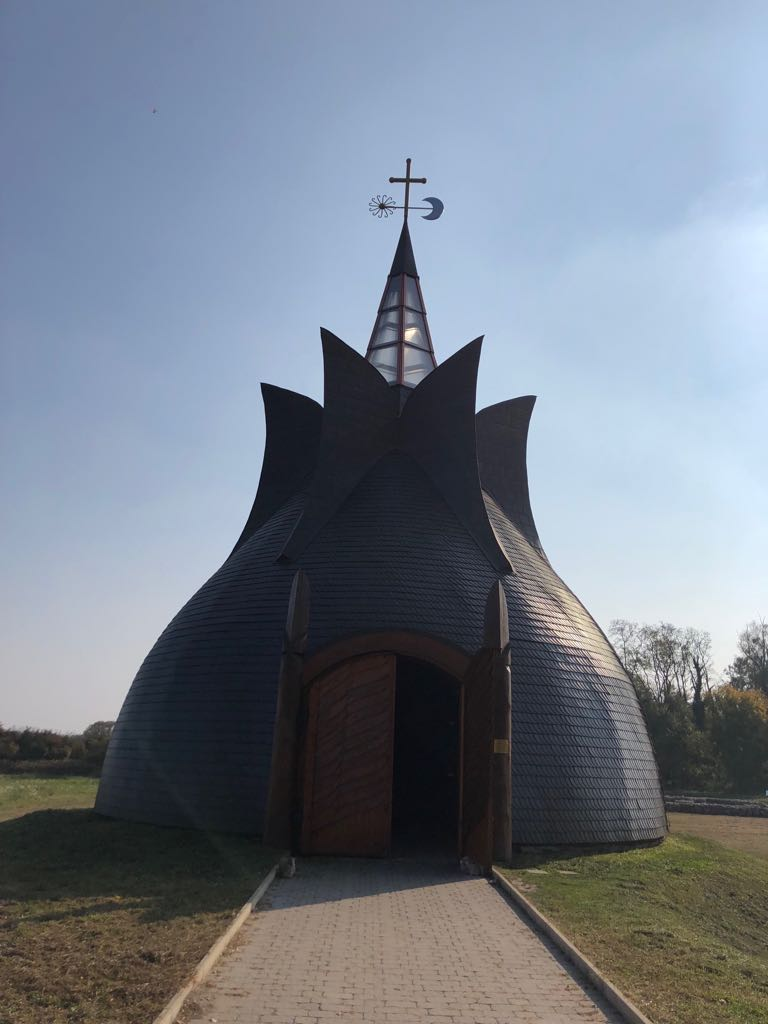
Millennial Monument (built by Imre Makovecz in 2009)

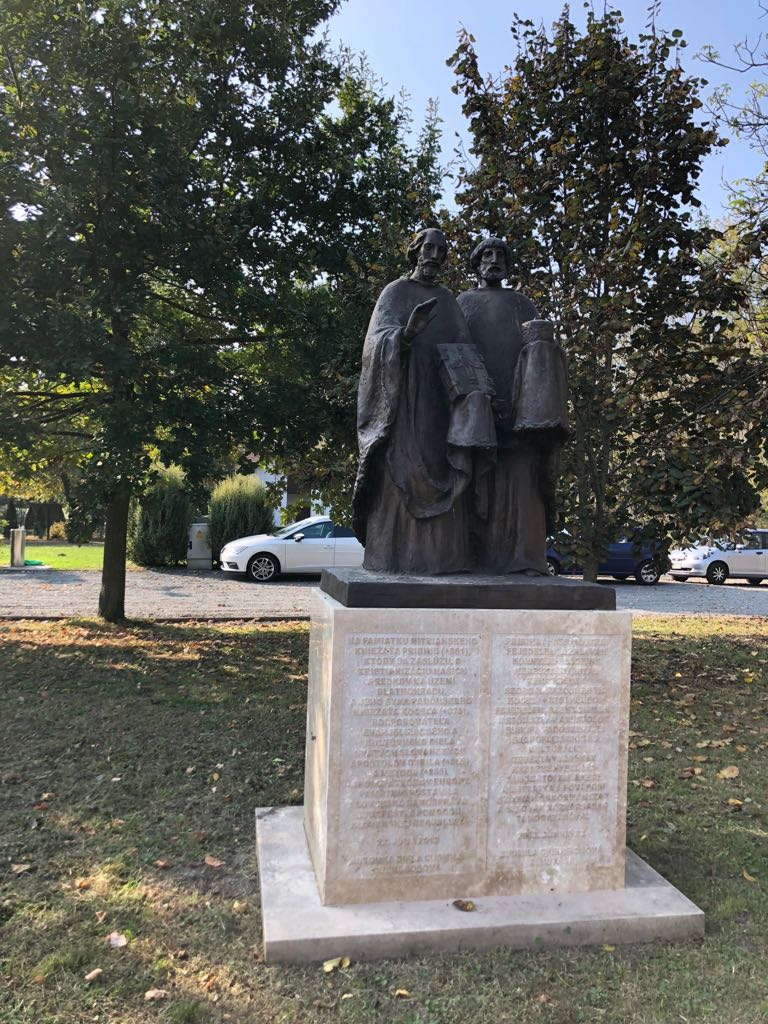
Sculptures of Saints Cyril and Methodius (erected in 2013)

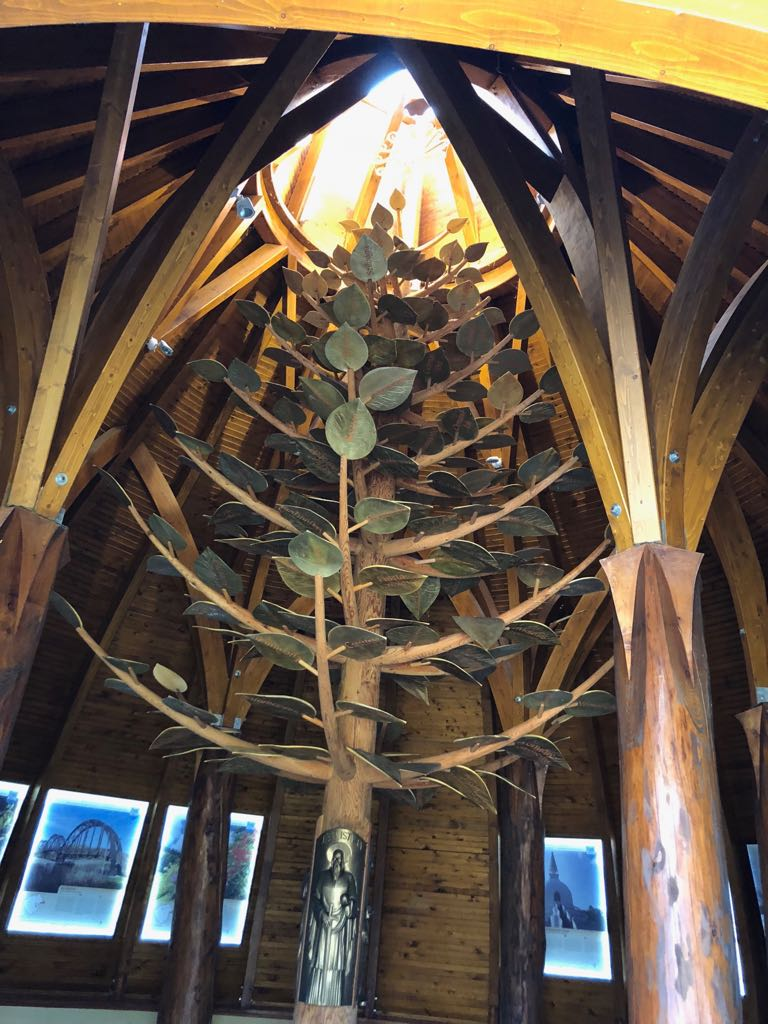
Tree of Life in the Millennial Monument (erected in 2011)
