= Pribina =

9th-century Slavic prince

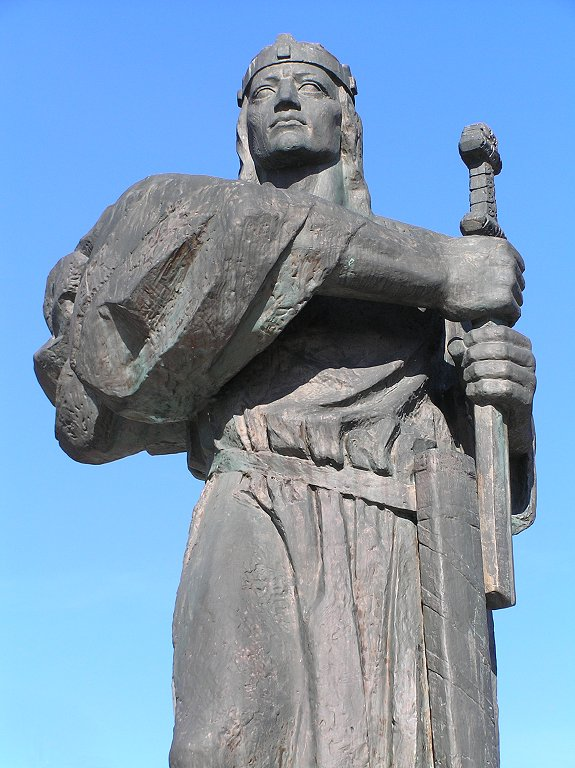
- Pribina Statue in NItra

Prince of Nitra (?)
- Reign: 825–833
- Successor: Mojmir I of Moravia ?

Duke of Lower Pannonia
- Reign: 846–861
- Successor: Koceľ
- Born: c. 800
- Died: 861
- Issue: Koceľ; Muntimerus Sclav.
- House: (?)

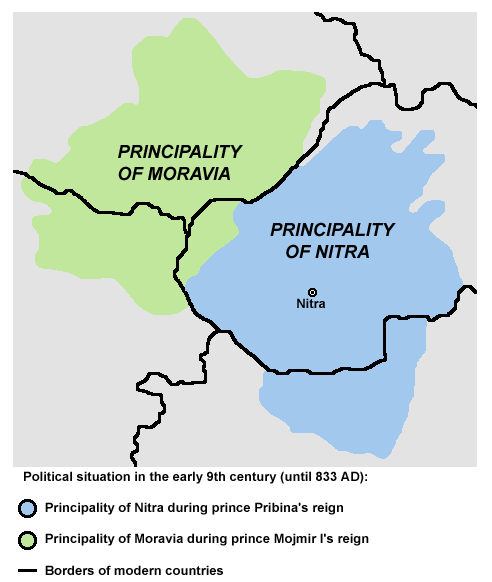
One view about the borders of the Principality of Nitra around 833

Pribina (c. 800 – 861) was a West Slavic prince whose adventurous career, recorded in the Conversion of the Bavarians and the Carantanians (a historical work written in 870), illustrates the political volatility of the Franco–Slavic frontiers of his time. Pribina was the first ruler of Slavic origin to build a Christian church on Slavic territory in Nitra, and also the first to accept baptism.

He was attacked and expelled from his homeland by Mojmir I, duke of Moravia. Pribina first fled to Ratpot, one of the border lords in East Francia. Thereafter he was wandering in Central and Southeastern Europe for several years. Finally, in the late 830s, Louis the German, king of East Francia granted Pribina lands near Lake Balaton (now in Hungary) where he set up his own principality under the king's suzerainty. He died fighting against the Moravians.

== Early life ==
According to a marginal notation to the Conversion that has by now been incorporated into its main text, Pribina's allodial lands were situated in Nitrava ultra Danuvium where Archbishop Adalram of Salzburg (821–836) consecrated a church, Since Nitrava has been identified, although not unanimously, with modern Nitra in Slovakia, Pribina is considered to have ruled the large early medieval fortress excavated at that town. The consecration of the church in Nitrava took place around 827, thus it was the first church in all Eastern Europe whose existence is documented in writing. That the church was consecrated for Pribina himself (who, all the same, still remained a catechumen), or for his wife cannot be decided. She seems to have been a member of the Bavarian Wilhelminer family.

Whether Pribina held Nitrava as a lieutenant of Mojmir I, the first known ruler of Moravia, or he was – maybe the second or third – prince of an independent Slavic principality is still debated by modern historians. The best source of his life, the Conversio Bagoariorum et Carantanorum never regarded him as dux (gentilis). Nevertheless, according to the Conversion, he was "driven across the Danube by Mojmir, duke of the Moravians" shortly after the defense of the eastern marches in East Francia had been taken over by Ratpot in around 833.

== Wanderings ==
Having been expelled, Pribina fled to Ratpot who presented him to Louis the German. The king ordered that Pribina be baptized in the church of Traismauer (Austria) and then serve with his followers in Ratpot's army. Before long, however, Ratpot and Pribina fell out, and the latter, fearing for his life, fled with his son Koceľ to the First Bulgarian Empire. However, Malamir of Bulgaria had by that time made peace with East Francia, thus Pribina was unable to persuade him to act against the Franks.

Subsequently, Pribina departed for Lower Pannonia, the region ruled by a Slavic prince, Ratimir. Since Lower Pannonia was part of Ratpot's prefecture, Ratimir's harboring of Pribina was tantamount to rebellion. Therefore, in 838 Louis the German sent Ratpot at the head of a large Bavarian army to crush Ratimir, but Pribina and his followers took refuge with the count of Carniola, Salacho. In short time the latter brokered a reconciliation between Ratpot and Pribina.

Louis the German now devised a plan to solve the ongoing instability in Lower Pannonia by making Pribina himself the new client ruler of that region. On January 10, 846, at the request of his followers, the king granted Pribina lands near Lake Balaton on the river Zala where he was to rule as Louis the German's faithful dux ("duke").

Having these events taken place, Ratpot took command of the borderlands' defense. In his day one Pribina driven across the Danube by Mojmir, duke of the Moravians came to Ratpot. Ratpot soon presented him to our lord and king, Louis. By order of the king Pribina was introduced to the faith and baptized in Saint Martin Church in a place called Traismauer, that is to say at a grange belonging to the Archbishopric of Salzburg. In time he was commended to Ratpot with whom he stayed for a time. Meanwhile, however, dissensions began to spring up between them. Feeling anxious about it, Pribina and his men, together with his son Kocil, fled for the land of the Bulgarians. Some time later he left the Bulgarians for dux Ratimar's territory. At that time king Louis sent Ratpot with a large force to expel prince Ratimar. Having no confidence in being able to defend himself, he took to flight together with his men who had escaped from the massacre. The above mentioned Pribina stopped, and crossed the river Sava, together with his men, where Count Salacho gave shelter to him and brought about his reconciliation with Ratbot. In time, as soon as the occasion arose, the king, at the request of his faithful men, gave Pribina as benefice the region of Lower Pannonia around the Zala River. He then began to live there, to build a fortress in a certain forest and swamp on the Zala River, gathered the surrounding peoples, and greatly thrived in that land. <For him, Archbishop Adalram had long ago consecrated a church on his estate at a place over the Danube called Nitrava.

— Conversion of the Bavarians and the Carantanians

== Dux in Lower Pannonia ==
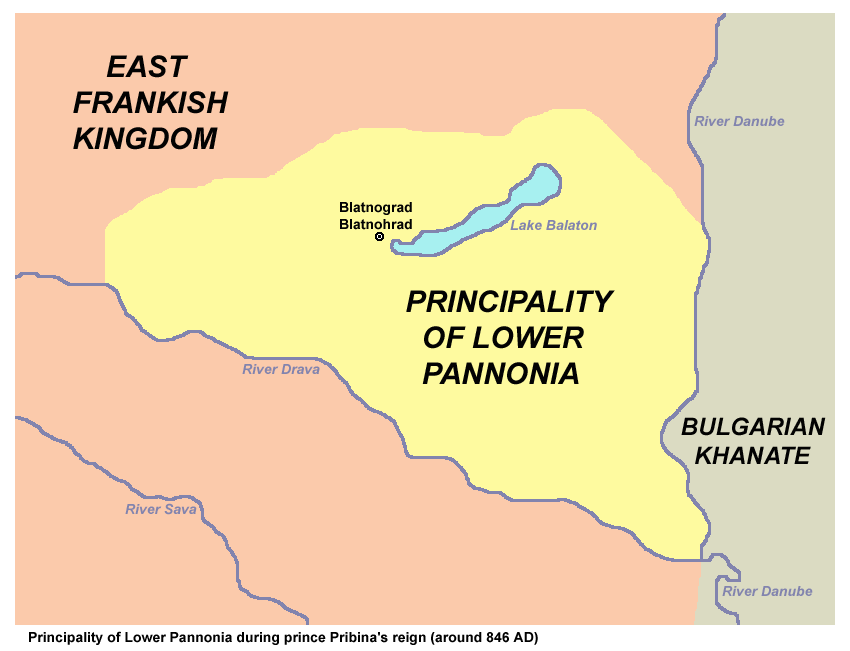
Principality of Lower Pannonia under Pribina's rule

Pribina's main duty was to gather the groups of Slavs who were fleeing from various directions, and to keep them loyal to the Franks. For this purpose, he began to build in 846 a large fortress as his seat of power in the region of Lake Balaton, in a territory of modern Zalavár surrounded by forests and swamps along the river Zala. His extremely well fortified castle that became known as Blatnohrad (Blatnograd) or Moosburg ("Swamp Fortress") served as a bulwark both against the Bulgarians and the Moravians. Pribina's authority stretched from the Rába river to the north, to Pécs to the southeast, and to Ptuj to the West.

Pribina undertook to Christianize the local population and built churches in the region. At his request, the archbishop of Salzburg consecrated a number of churches in Lower Pannonia, among them one at modern Pécs. Pribina also made a donation of three hundred homesteads and vineyards on a knee of the river Zala to the monastery of Niederaltaich, which was confirmed in 860 by Louis the German.

Pribina seems to have played a prominent role in Louis the German's campaigns against Mojmir I of Moravia. For example, in 846 the king made a generous gift of one hundred homesteads in the Bavarian marches to him, presumably in order to help supply Pribina's troops in the upcoming campaign. Moreover, in 847 Louis the German converted all Pribina's benefices near Lake Balaton, save those he held from the archbishop of Salzburg, into personal property in order to reward him for his loyal service, presumably in the recent campaigns against the Bohemians and the Moravians.

There is some uncertainty about Pribina's death. He may have been killed in a battle with the Moravians who supported Louis the German's son, Carloman in a revolt against the king, or he may have been captured and handed over to the Moravians by Carloman. His son, Koceľ was installed as the ruler of Lower Pannonia in 864 by Louis the German.

== See also ==
- Principality of Nitra
- Principality of Lower Pannonia

== Sources ==
- Bartl, Július (2002). Slovak History: Chronology & Lexicon. Bolchazy-Carducci Publishers. ISBN 0-86516-444-4.
- Bowlus, Charles R. (1994). Franks, Moravians, and Magyars: The Struggle for the Middle Danube, 788–907. Philadelphia (Pa.): University of Pennsylvania Press. ISBN 0-8122-3276-3.
- Chropovský, Bohuslav (1989), The Slavs: Their Significance, Political and Cultural History, Prague: Orbis Press Agency
- Curta, Florin (2006-08-31). Southeastern Europe in the Middle Ages, 500-1250. Cambridge New York: Cambridge University Press. ISBN 978-0-521-89452-4.
- Goldberg, Eric J. (2009) [2006]. Struggle for Empire: Kingship and Conflict under Louis the German, 817-876. Ithaca London: Conjunctions of Religion and P. ISBN 978-0-8014-7529-0.
- Kirschbaum, Stanislav J. (2007). Historical Dictionary of Slovakia. Lanham (Md.): Scarecrow press. ISBN 978-0-8108-5535-9.
- Luthar, Oto (2008). The Land Between: A History of Slovenia. Frankfurt am Main Bern Wien: Peter Lang. ISBN 978-3-631-57011-1.
- Róna-Tas, András (1999). Hungarians and Europe in the Early Middle Ages: An Introduction to Early Hungarian History. Budapest New York: Central European Univ. Press. ISBN 978-963-9116-48-1.
- Sommer, Petr; Třeštík, Dušan; Žemlička, Josef; Opačić, Zoë (2007). Bohemia and Moravia. In: Berend, Nora (2007); Christianization and the Rise of Christian Monarchy: Scandinavia, Central Europe and Rus’, c. 900–1200; Cambridge University Press; ISBN 978-0-521-87616-2.
- Spiesz, Anton; Caplovic, Dusan; Bolchazy, Ladislaus J. (2006). Illustrated Slovak History: A Struggle for Sovereignty in Central Europe. Bolchazy-Carducci Publishers, Inc. ISBN 978-0-86516-426-0.
- Vlasto, A. P. (1970-10-02). The Entry of the Slavs Into Christendom: An Introduction to the Medieval History of the Slavs. London: CUP Archive. ISBN 0-521-07459-2.
- Wolfram, Herwig (1979). Conversio Bagoariorum et Carantanorum: Das Weissbuch der Salzburger Kirche über die erfolgreiche Mission in Karantanien und Pannonien (in German). Wien: Böhlau. ISBN 978-3-205-08361-0.
