= Kocel =

Early medieval Slavic ruler

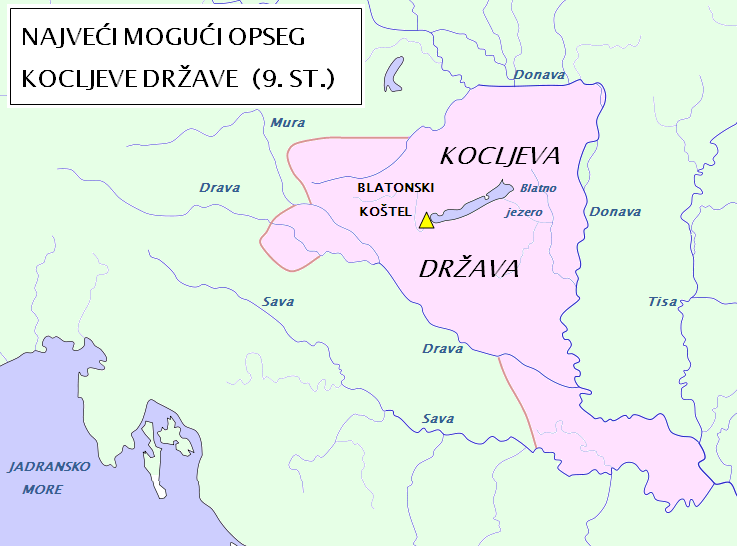
Principality of Lower Pannonia under Kocel

Kocel (fl. 861–876) was a ruler of the Principality of Lower Pannonia. He was an East Frankish vassal titled comes (count), and is believed to have ruled between 861 or 864 and 876 from Mosapurc, also known in Old-Slavonic as Blatnograd (modern Zalavár near Lake Balaton).

== Life ==
Kocel was the second son of Pribina, a Slavic dux installed by the Franks in Lower Pannonia in ca. 838 or 840. Bowlus believes he was born in ca. 820. In 861, Kocel made a significant donation to the Freising monastery, showing that he had a solid social and political standing. According to Bowlus, this document indicates that Pribina had died, and Kocel succeeded him. Louis the German installed Kocel as a ruler in Lower Pannonia in 864. Kocel held "Lower Pannonia" (Pannonia inferioris) in 865, when Archbishop Adalwin of Salzburg visited his lands twice. In 869, Kocel had requested for Byzantine missionary Methodius to be sent into Pannonia as a papal legate. In midsummer, Kocel sent Methodius to Rome with twenty men to petition for his elevation to bishop. Hadrian II appointed Methodius the archbishop of Sirmium, and sent confirmations to, among others, Kocel, whose land lay within the jurisdiction. Frankish Pannonia was held by Kocel and Bavarian margraves in 871; Kocel enjoyed independence, as evident from his talks with the pope. In 874, following the Moravian conflict, Kocel continued to rule the Drava Valley, presumably under Carloman of the March of Pannonia. Kocel disappears from sources after 874, and was either dead or removed from his office c. 876, certainly dead by 880.

== Identification with other commanders ==
Some historians consider that Kocel can be identified with Frankish military commander Kotzil/Kotzilis mentioned in De Administrando Imperio regarding the armed revolt by the Croats (presumably in the time of Duke Domagoj) who "managed to prevail and killed all the Franks and their archon, called Kotzil" (also identified with Cadolah of Friuli d. 819), most probably in 874 which coincides with Kocel's disappearance from the sources. According to Francis Dvornik, the DAI's account is possibly "telescoping" different events related to Ljudevit, Borna, and finally in which Kocel "had perished in 876". Neven Budak concluded that the DAI's account about Croatian revolt against the Franks cannot be connected to Kocel.

== Titles ==
- "Count of Slavs" (comes de Sclavis nomine Chezul), 861 Latin gift deed
- "Duke" (Chezil dux), posthumously between 876 and 880

== Annotations ==
1. He is known from Bavarian and Papal documents mostly as Chozil, Chezil, Chezul, and Gozil. Conversio Bagoariorum et Carantanorum uses Chozil, Chezil, and Chezilo. The most used rendering is Kocel. His name is also spelt Koceľ in Slovak, and Kocelj (Коцељ) in Slovenian and Serbo-Croatian.

== Sources ==
- Bowlus, Charles R. (1995). Franks, Moravians, and Magyars: The Struggle for the Middle Danube, 788-907. University of Pennsylvania Press. ISBN 978-0-8122-3276-9.
- Francis Dvornik; Romilly Jenkins; Bernard Lewis; Gyula Moravcsik; Dimitri Obolensky; Steven Runciman (1962). Jenkins, Romilly (ed.). De Administrando Imperio: Volume II Commentary. London: The Athlone Press, University of London.
- Goldberg, Eric Joseph (2006). Struggle for Empire: Kingship and Conflict Under Louis the German, 817-876. Cornell University Press. ISBN 0-8014-3890-X.
- Hellēnikē Hetaireia Slavikōn Meletōn (1999). Thessaloniki, Magna Moravia: proceedings of the International conference, Thessaloniki, 16-19 october 1997. Hellenic Association for Slavic Studies. p. 92. ISBN 9789608595934.
