= Conversio Bagoariorum et Carantanorum =

Latin history written in the 870s

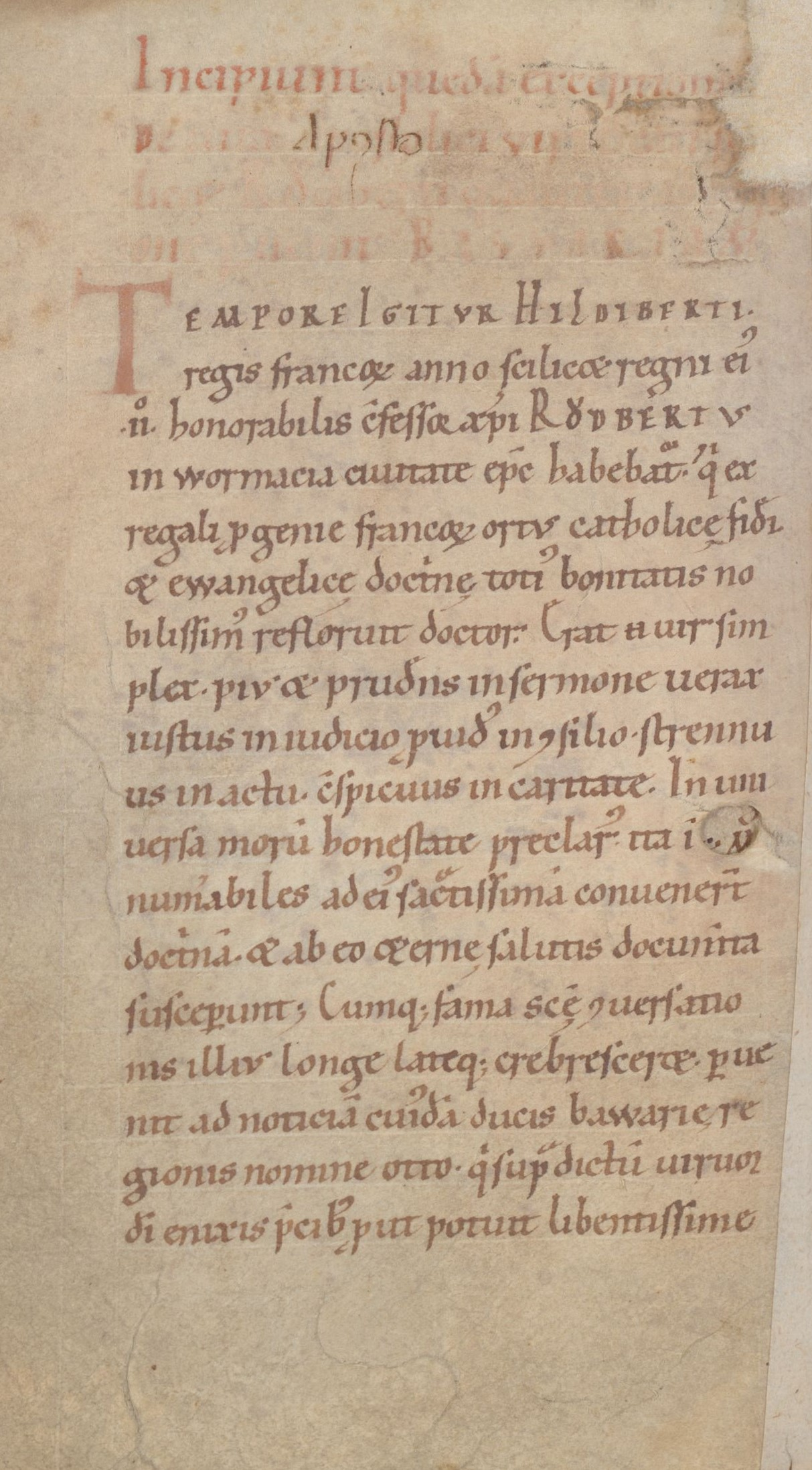
First page of a 10th-century copy of the Conversio

The Conversio Bagoariorum et Carantanorum ("The Conversion of the Bavarians and the Carantanians") is a Latin history written in Salzburg in the 870s. It describes the life and career of Salzburg's founding saint Rupert (d. 710), notably his missionary work in Bavaria, and the activities of the bishops and abbots in the Archdiocese of Salzburg. It concludes with a brief history of Carantania.

The work may have been written by Adalwin himself, the then resident Archbishop of Salzburg. It was intended to give Louis the German a particular historical perspective on a recent collision between the missionary work conducted from Salzburg and that pursued by the brothers Cyril and Methodius, who preached the new religion among the Slavic people of Great Moravia and Pannonia.

== Editions ==
- Wolfram, Herwig, ed. (1979). Conversio Bagoariorum et Carantanorum. Vienna: Böhlau.
- Bartoňková, Dagmar; et al., eds. (1969). "Libellus de conversione Bagoariorum et Carantanorum (i.e. Conversio)". Magnae Moraviae fontes historici III. Prague: Statni pedagogicke nakl.
