= Myriorama =

Myriorama can mean one of several kinds of 19th century entertainment, especially:

- A late 19th-century form of the moving panorama
- A popular optical toy which involved the rearranging of specially-made picture-cards.
