= J. R. Smith (disambiguation) =

J. R. Smith (born 1985) is an American former professional basketball player.

J. R. Smith may also refer to:

- Jay R. Smith (1915–2002), American actor
- John Raphael Smith (1751–1812), British engraver
- John Rubens Smith (1775–1849), British artist and engraver
- John Rowson Smith (1810–1864), American panoramic painter
