= Julia Morison =

New Zealand artist (born 1952)

Julia Morison ONZM
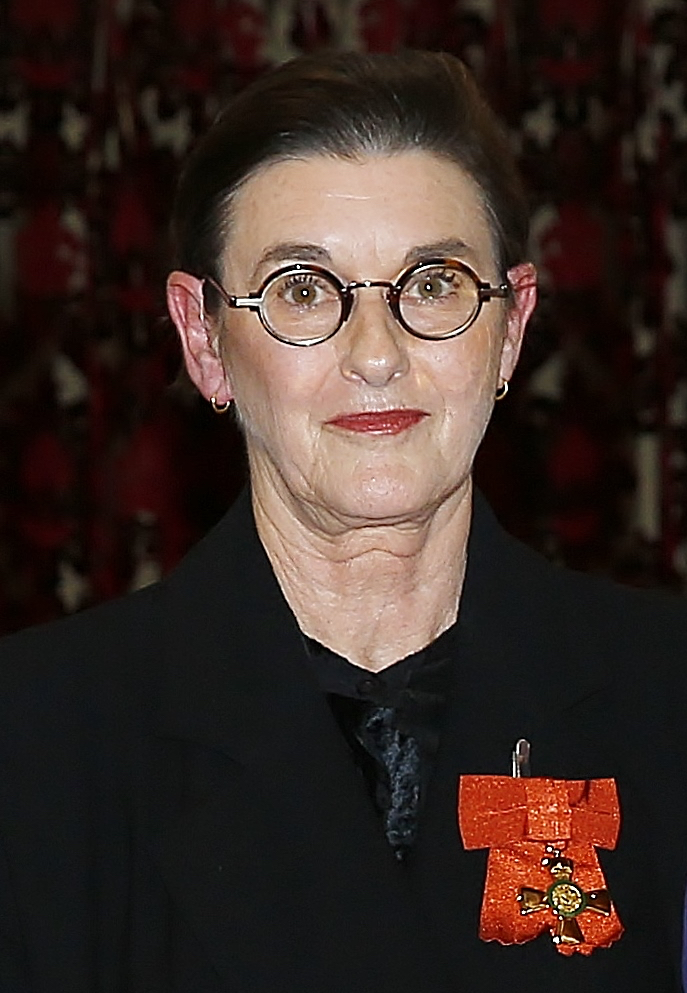
- Born: Julia Morison; 1952 (age 73–74); Pahiatua, New Zealand
- Education: Wellington Polytechnic School of Design at Massey University;School of Fine Arts at University of Canterbury
- Known for: Painting, sculpture, photography, installation art
- Awards: Laureate Award Arts Foundation of New Zealand
- Website: http://juliamorison.nz/

Julia Morison ONZM (born 1952) is a New Zealand artist working across a wide range of media including painting, sculpture, photography, installation and recently ceramics.

== Education ==
Morison completed a Diploma in Graphic Design from Wellington Polytechnic School of Design, Massey University in 1972. She completed a Bachelor of Fine Arts with Honours from the University of Canterbury School of Fine Arts in 1975.

== Career ==
Morison was awarded the Frances Hodgkins Fellowship in 1988 and undertook the Moët & Chandon contemporary art residency in Avize, France in 1990. After the year long residency she remained in France for ten years.

In 1999 Morison became Senior Lecturer in Painting at the University of Canterbury, a position she held until 2007.

Morison received a Laureate Award from the Arts Foundation of New Zealand in 2005.

A major survey exhibition on Morison's work, A loop around a loop: Julia Morison was organised by the Christchurch Art Gallery and the Dunedin Public Art Gallery in 2006, and curated by Felicity Milburn and Justin Paton.

In 2012 Morison was inducted into the Massey University College of Creative Arts' Hall of Fame. In the same year her exhibition Meet me on the other side showed at Christchurch Art Gallery and City Gallery Wellington.

In 2013 her public sculpture Tree Houses for Swamp Dwellers was installed in central Christchurch as part of the SCAPE public art project. A response to the devastating Christchurch earthquakes, the work is designed to be a permanent but relocatable feature of the city.

In the 2018 New Year Honours, Morison was appointed an Officer of the New Zealand Order of Merit, for services to visual arts.

== Work ==
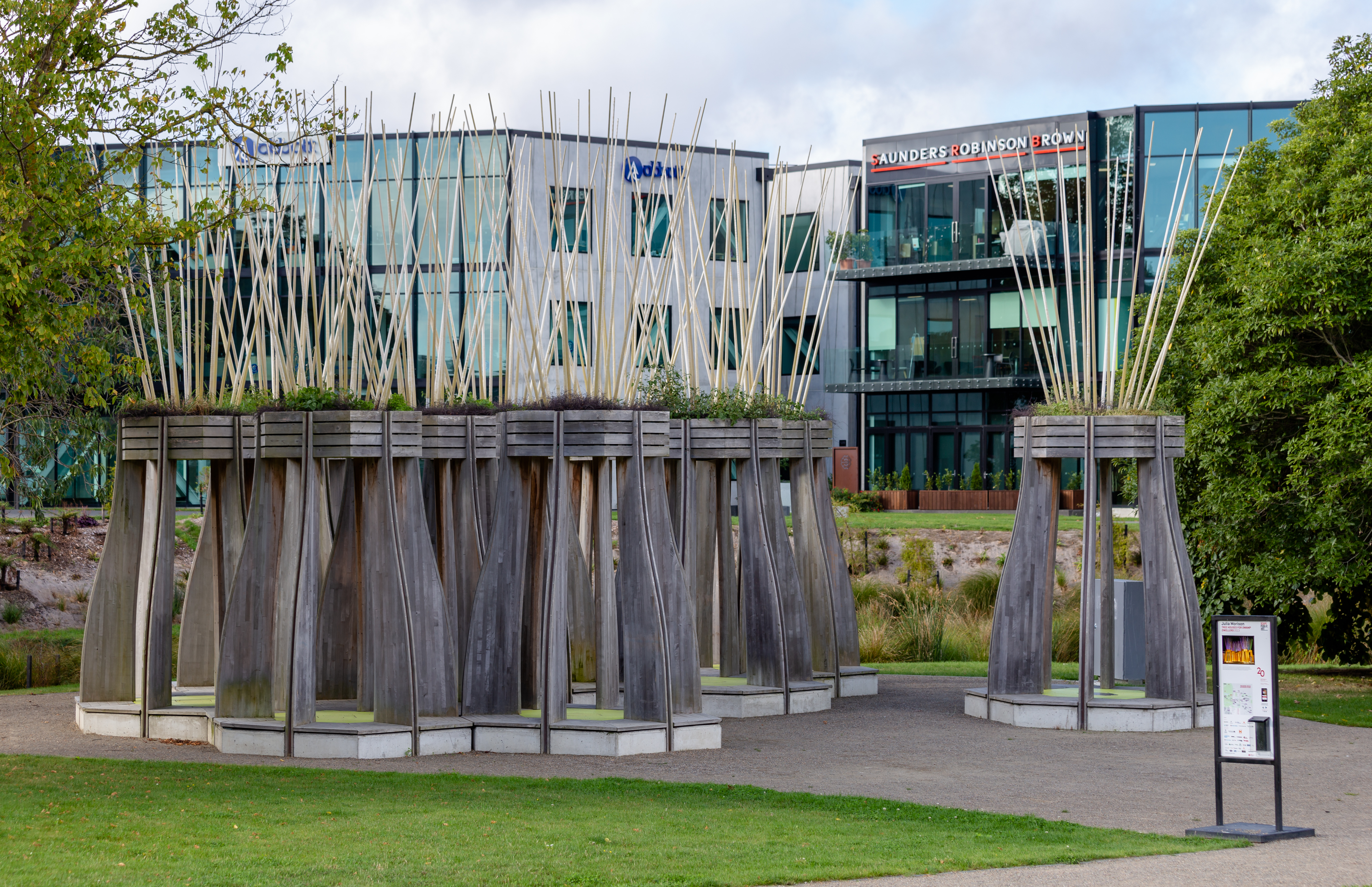
Morison's art installation Tree Houses for Swamp Dwellers by the Avon River in Christchurch

Morison's early work (from the time she finished art school) concentrated on 'severely formalist' paintings. After taking a break from exhibiting, in the mid 1980s Morison returned with a series of complex and ambitious works which became signatures in her career. Large multi-part works such as Vademecum (1986) and Golem (1987) are based on a system Morison created based on the number 10, referencing the Sefirothic Tree of Kabbalah and using ten 'logos' and ten key materials ('transparency', gold, silver, 'iridescence', lead, mercury or mercuric-oxide, clay, ash, blood, excrement), in various combinations. These systems continue to inform much of the artist's work. This system has informed a great many of her paintings and installation works, and she continues to work with replicating forms (like the Celtic knot) and organising principles (like Victorian myriorama).

In 1997 Morison collaborated with fashion designer Martin Grant on Material evidence: 100-headless woman, a series of ten dresses, each three metres high and each based on a specific material, such as gold, silver, lead, excrement, blood, pearl, and clay.

After the 2011 Christchurch earthquake Morison could not continue painting and instead began making sculptural works, using plaster, clay, the liquefaction sediment from the earthquake and found objects. Recently she has been working on a major new series of porcelain and stoneware ceramic head forms, called Headcases. She has currently produced about 30 works from an intended series of 100.

== Collections ==
Morison's work in held in many New Zealand public gallery collections, including Christchurch Art Gallery, Auckland Art Gallery and the Museum of New Zealand Te Papa Tongarewa.

== Reviews ==
- Gina Irish, 'My Place: Julia Morison', Art New Zealand, no 109, Summer 2003–2004
- John Hurrell, 'Morison Sculpture in Auckland', EyeContact, 29 November 2011
- Creon Upton, 'Morison's Plaster Wall Sculptures', EyeContact, 22 September 2013
- Andrew Paul Wood, 'Morison Tree Houses in Christchurch', EyeContact, 12 October 2013
- Mark Amery, 'Short Shrift', The Big Idea, 8 October 2014
- Allan Smith, 'Julia Morison's Headcases', EyeContact, 9 April 2015
