= John Rubens Smith =

American artist (1775–1849)

John Smith
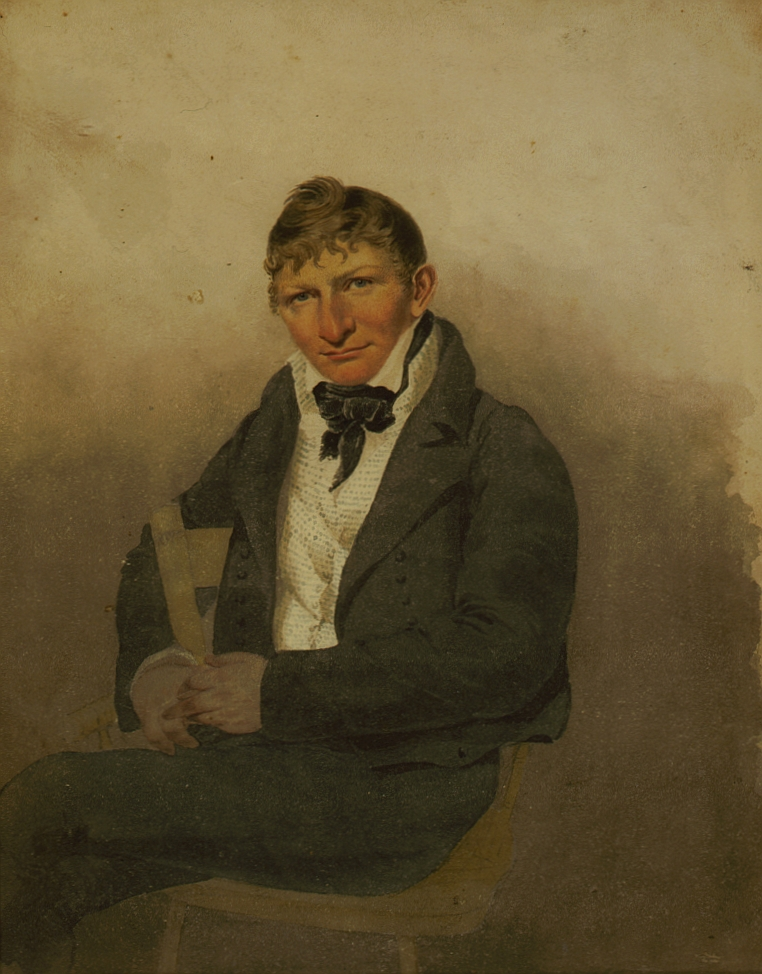
- Self-portrait, c. 1817
- Born: January 23, 1775; London, England
- Died: August 21, 1849 (aged 74); New York City, United States
- Children: John
- Parent: John Smith

John Rubens Smith (January 23, 1775 – August 21, 1849) was a London-born painter, printmaker and art instructor who worked in the United States.

== Biography ==
Smith was born in London where he first studied art with his father, John Raphael Smith, a mezzotint engraver. Smith later studied art at the Royal Academy.

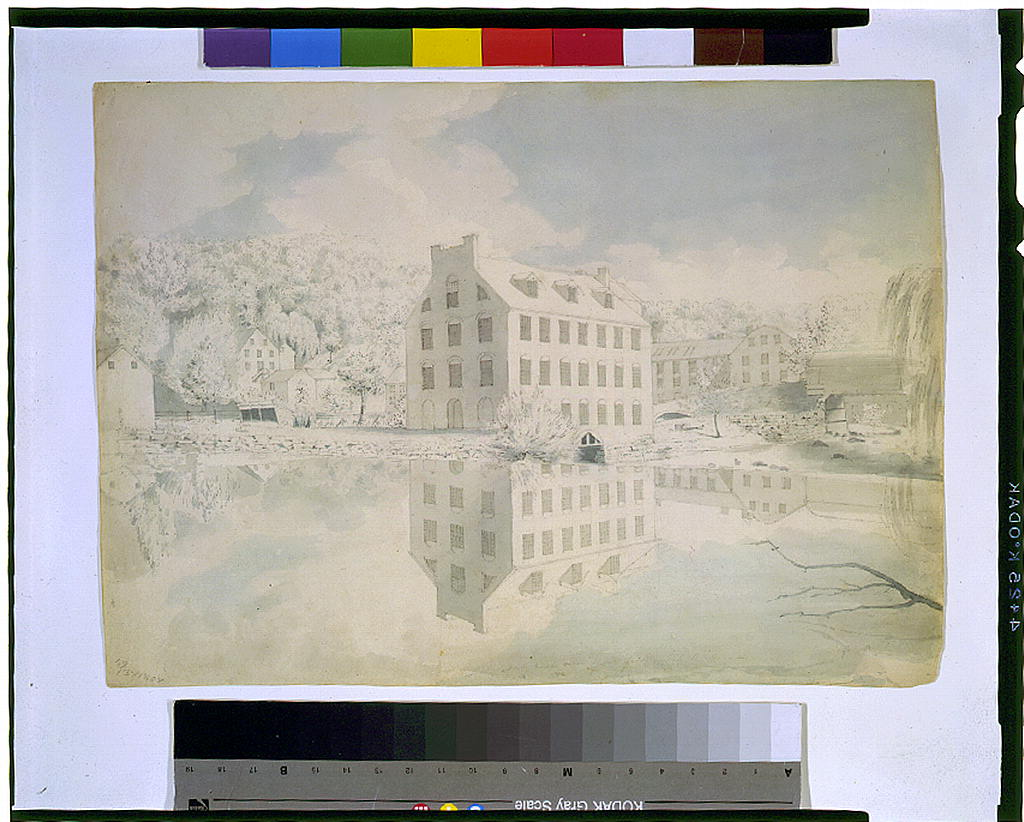
Young's Mill on Brandywine Creek

Around 1807, Smith emigrated from London to New York City. He depicted the United States in the decades before photography, and influenced a generation of American artists through his drawing academies and drawing manuals. He died in New York City.

Merchants Hotel, North 4th Street in Philadelphia

His son John Rowson Smith was a moving panorama painter who worked with Richard Risley Carlisle.

== Works ==
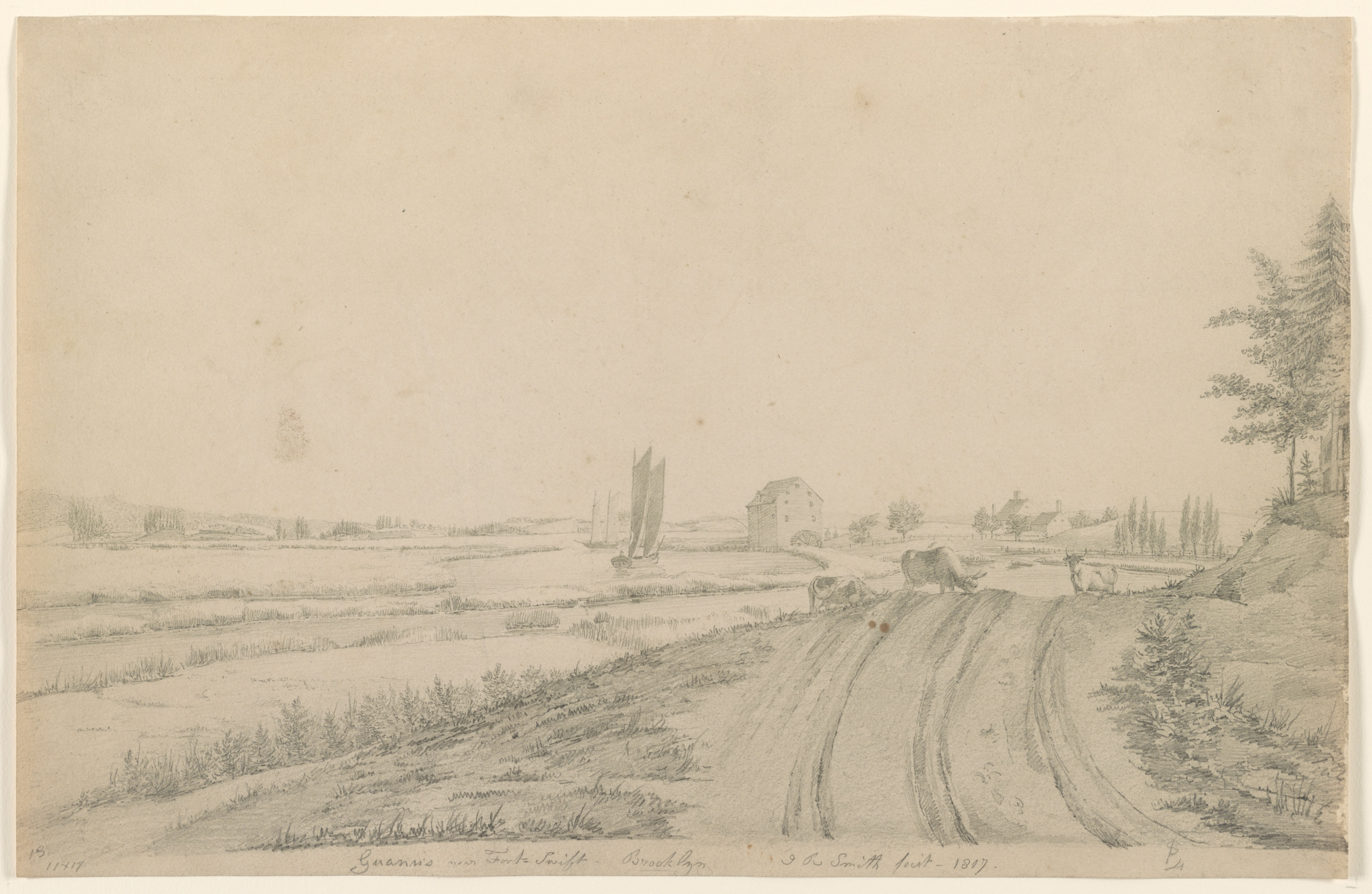
Guann's near Fort Smith, Brooklyn

- The juvenile drawing-book (1844)

== Gallery ==
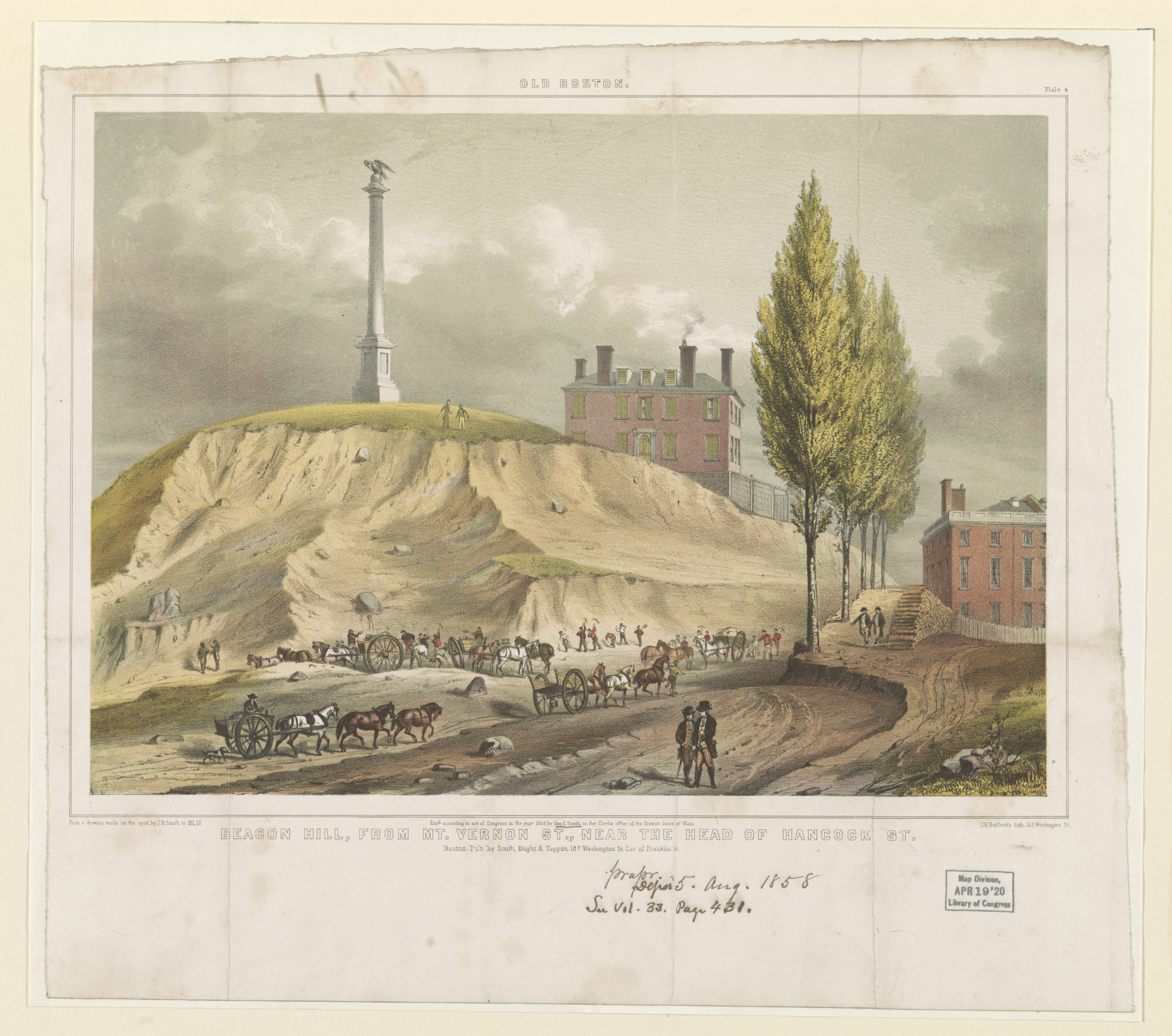
Beacon Hill, Boston

Catskill Mountain-House

Officer from First Troop, Philadelphia
