= John Banvard =

American painter

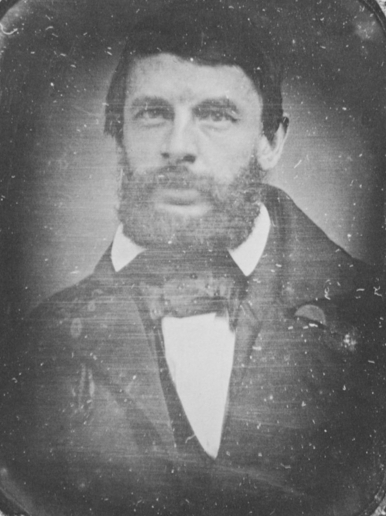
- John Banvard, ca.1855
- Born: November 15, 1815; New York, New York
- Died: May 16, 1891 (aged 75); Watertown, South Dakota
- Resting place: Mount Hope Cemetery, Watertown, South Dakota

John Banvard (November 15, 1815 – May 16, 1891) was a panorama and portrait painter known for his panoramic views of the Mississippi River Valley. He was a pioneer in moving panoramic paintings.

== Biography ==
John Banvard was born in New York and was educated in high school. When his father went bankrupt, he began to travel around the United States, and supported himself with paintings he exhibited.

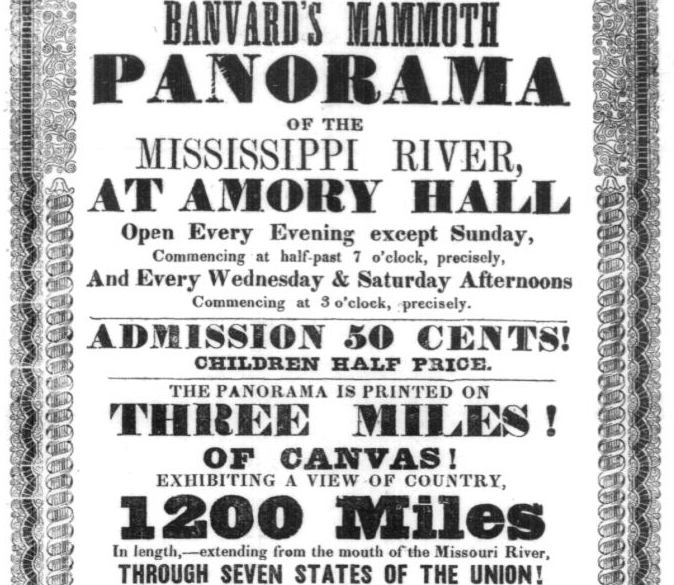
Advertisement for Banvard's Mississippi panorama at Amory Hall, Boston, 1847

In 1840, he began to paint large panoramas of the whole Mississippi River valley. He traveled through the area in a boat, made preliminary drawings and supported himself with paintings and hunting. He combined the preliminary sketches and transferred them to a canvas in a building erected for this purpose in Louisville, Kentucky. His largest panorama began as 12 feet (3,6 m) high and 1,300 feet (369 m) long and was eventually expanded to about half a mile (about 800 meters) although it was advertised as a "three-mile canvas". It toured around the nation, and was eventually cut up into hundreds of pieces, none of which still exist today.

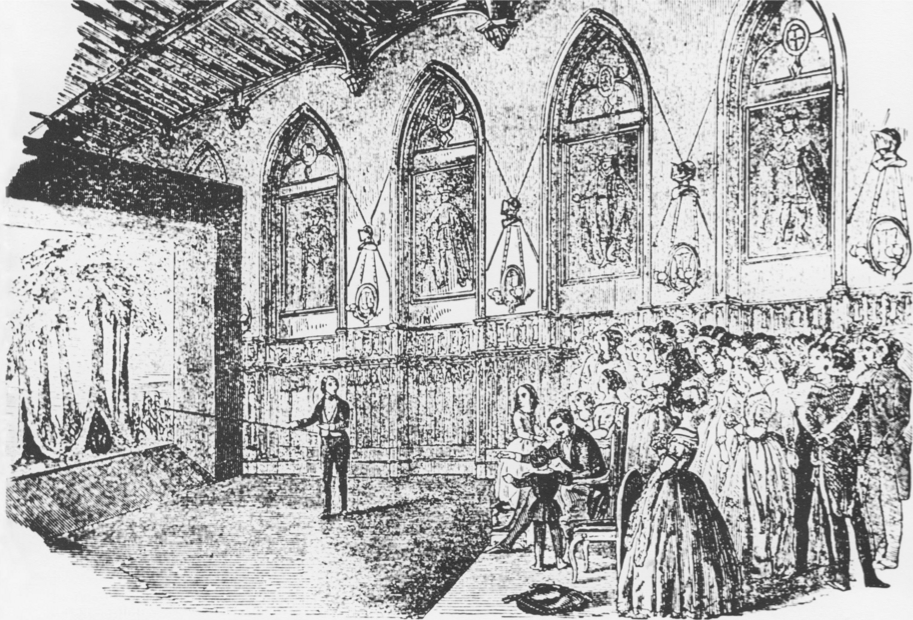
Banvard presenting to Queen Victoria, Windsor Castle, 1849

Scientific American magazine published a piece under "New Inventions" in its issue of December 16, 1848, describing and illustrating Banvard's mechanism for displaying a moving panorama.

He premiered his panorama of the Mississippi in Boston in December 1846. After a run of nearly a year, he took the production to New York City and then to Europe, Asia, and Africa and even gave Queen Victoria a private viewing. His portrait was painted in 1849 by the English artist Anna Mary Howitt.

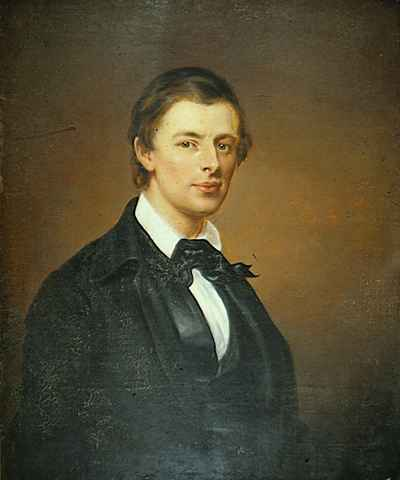
Portrait of John Banvard by Anna Mary Howitt

During his travels, he also painted panoramas in Palestine and the Nile River Valley.

Banvard had a rivalry with panorama performers John Rowson Smith and Richard Risley Carlisle. Banvard called them imitators and "unprincipled persons". They in turn referred to the "crude efforts of the uncultivated artist" Banvard. Banvard suggested that Smith and Carlisle's panorama was actually painted by George Catlin, who had copied the image after his own panorama.

On his return he invested part of the fortune he had made in 60 acres (240,000 m^{2}) overlooking Cold Spring Harbor on the North Shore of Long Island, where during 1852–1855, in competition with P. T. Barnum's palace "Iranistan" in Bridgeport, Connecticut, he proceeded to design and have built a baronial residence from its eastern shore, which, it was given out, was intended to resemble Windsor Castle; he named the place Glenada, the glen of his daughter Ada, but the locals called it "Banvard's Folly". After his death it became a fashionable resort hotel, The Glenada.

In 1875, he published in the U.S.A. a book "The Private Life of a King" which in large parts was plagiarised from one published some years earlier in the United Kingdom.

During World War 2, a Liberty ship was named the S.S. John Banvard.

The Brooklyn-based history band Pinataland recorded a song about Banvard's travails for their 2008 album "Songs for the Forgotten Future Vol. 2".

In 2016, a new musical entitled Georama: An American Panorama Told on Three Miles of Canvas premiered at the Repertory Theatre of St. Louis. The musical tells Banvard's life story through his rise and fall as an artist, his conflict with P. T. Barnum and love for his wife Elizabeth. Georama was written by West Hyler, Matt Schatz, and Jack Herrick. It premiered in 2017 on August 2 through 6th at New York Musical Theatre Festival, and starred PJ Griffith, Jillian Louis, Randy Blair, and Nick Sullivan.

== See also ==
- Myriorama
- Panoramic painting
