= John Rowson Smith =

American painter (1810–1864)

- Born: 1810; Boston, Massachusetts, U.S.
- Died: 1864 (aged 53–54); Philadelphia, Pennsylvania, U.S.
- Resting place: Laurel Hill Cemetery, Philadelphia, Pennsylvania, U.S.
- Occupation: Painter
- Parent: John Smith

John Rowson Smith (1810 – 1864) was an American painter and a pioneer in the creation of moving panoramas. His Leviathan Panorama of the Mississippi River was created in the 1840s, covered 20,000 square feet of canvas, and depicted approximately 2,000 miles of landscape along the Mississippi River that spanned nine states. The panorama was displayed at theaters in the United States and Europe from 1848 to 1852.

== Early life ==
He was born in 1810 in Boston, Massachusetts. Most of his childhood was spent in Brooklyn before he moved to Philadelphia in 1830. He was taught painting by his father John Rubens Smith. His grandfather was the British painter and mezzotinter John Raphael Smith.

== Career ==
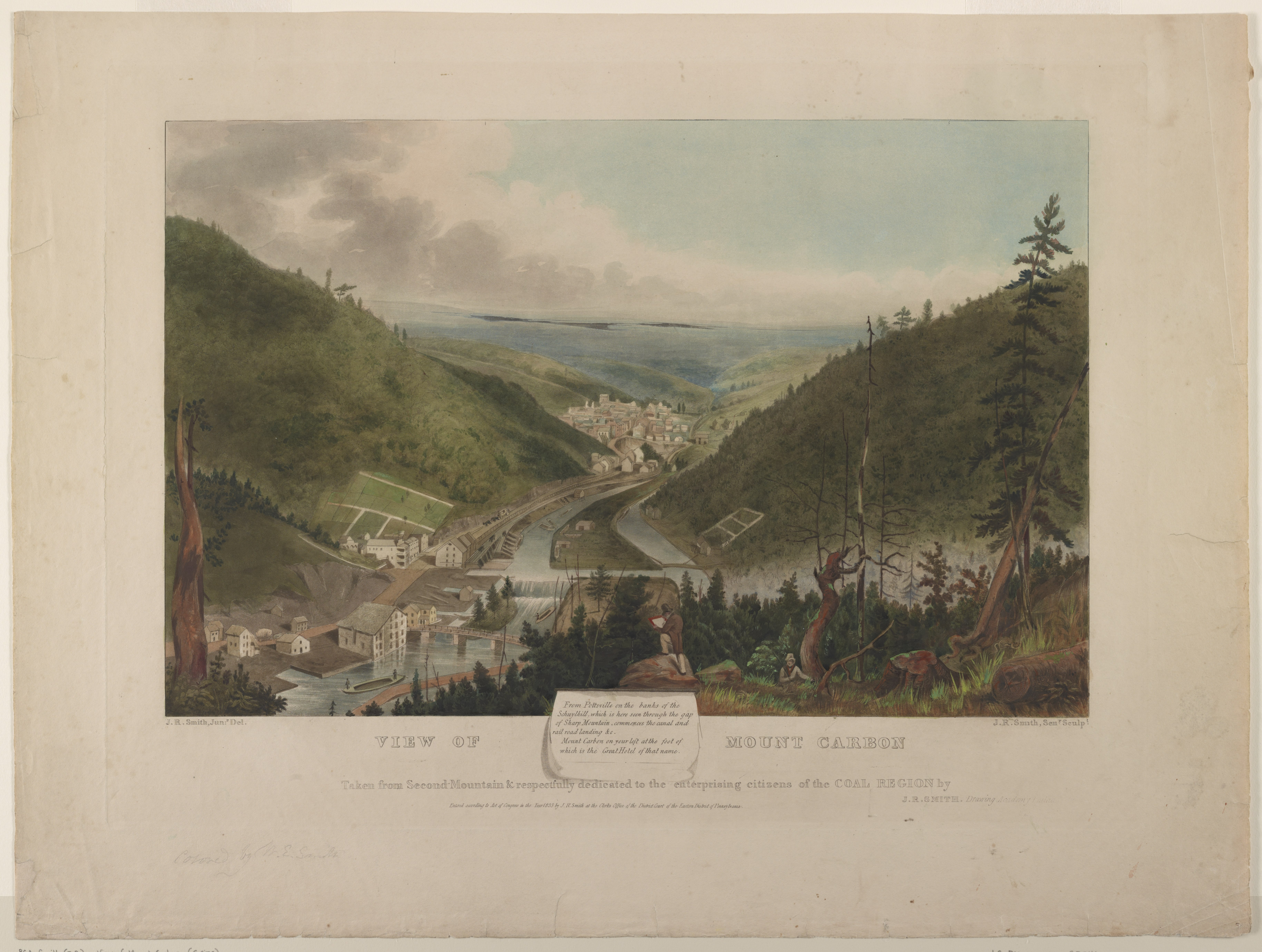
Painting of Mount Carbon, Pennsylvania, by John Rowson Smith engraved by his father

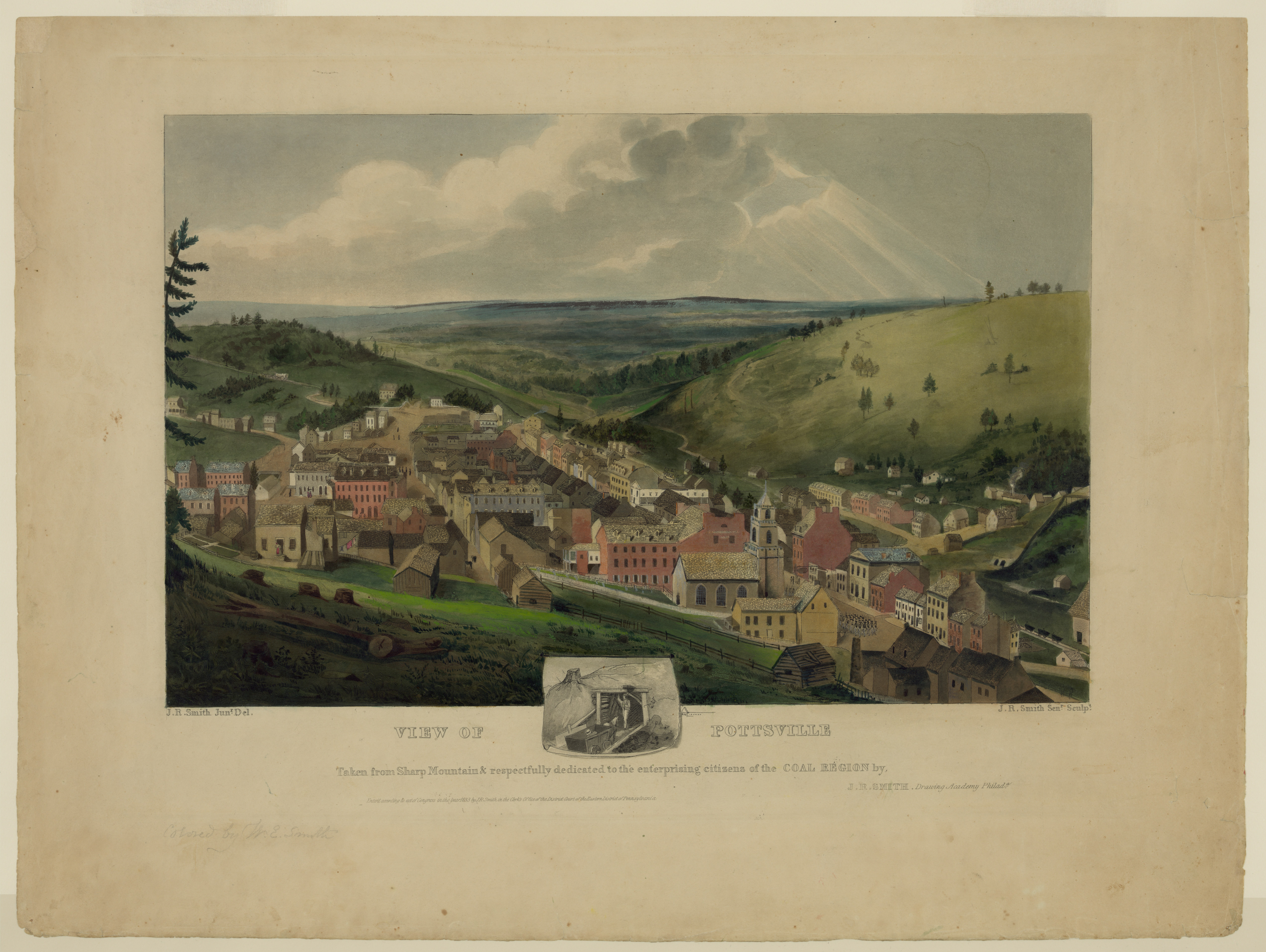
View of Pottsville, Pennsylvania

Smith began as a scenery painter for the National Theater in Philadelphia. He also painted theatrical scenery in Boston, New Orleans, New York, and St. Louis. He was a pioneer in the creation of moving panoramas and produced the Leviathan Panorama of the Mississippi River which covered 20,000 square feet of canvas and depicted approximately 2,000 miles of landscape along the river across nine states. The panorama was divided into three parts: the "Corn Region" depicted the head of the river to the Ohio River; the "Cotton Region" depicted from the Ohio River to Natchez, Mississippi; and the "Sugar Region" depicted from Natchez to the Gulf of Mexico. The moving panorama was displayed in Troy, New York, and Philadelphia, Pennsylvania, in 1848 and then throughout major cities in Europe from 1849 to 1852.

Smith's panorama business partner was Richard Risley Carlisle, an acrobat who performed under the moniker Professor Risley. He and Smith claimed to be the originator of the Mississippi moving panorama, however other rivaling panoramas of the Mississippi were created by John Banvard, Henry Lewis, Leon D. Pomerede and Samuel B. Stockwell. The panoramists competed for audience and made exaggerated claims about their work. Smith falsely claimed that his panorama was four miles in length. None of these works, including Smith's, survived to the current day.

He returned to theatrical scenery painting and died in Philadelphia in 1864. He was interred at Laurel Hill Cemetery.

== Additional reading ==
- McDermott, John Francis, The Lost Panoramas of the Mississippi, University of Chicago Press, 1958
