= Robert Barker (painter) =

British painter (1739–1806)

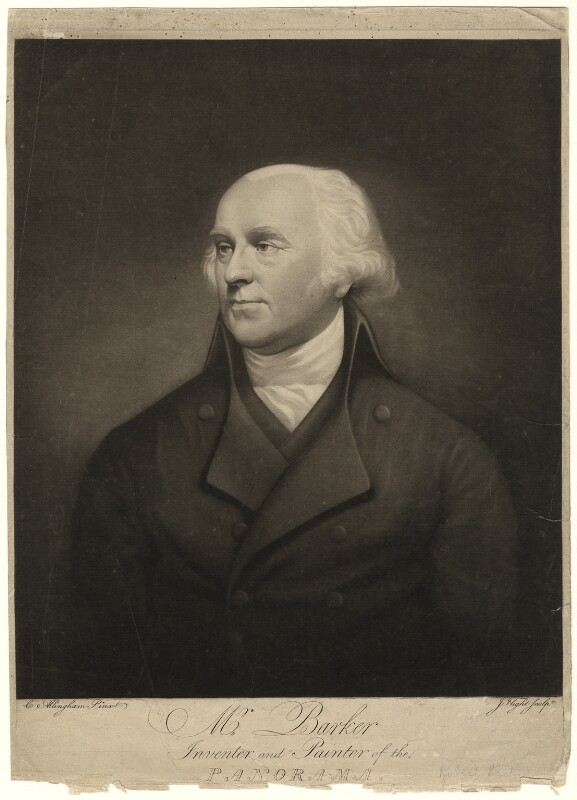
Robert Barker

Robert Barker (1739 – 8 April 1806) was a painter from Kells, County Meath, Ireland, known for his panoramic paintings and for his coinage of the word "panorama".

== Biography ==
The itinerant portrait painter Robert Barker coined the word "panorama", from Greek pan ("all") horama ("view"), in 1792 to describe his paintings of Edinburgh, Scotland, shown on a cylindrical surface, which he soon was exhibiting in London, as "The Panorama". The Barker Panorama of Edinburgh from Calton Hill is considered to be the earliest panorama view and held within University of Edinburgh. This six-piece set of engravings show a 360-degree view of the city of Edinburgh from a standing position on Calton Hill.

In 1793, Barker moved his panoramas to the first purpose-built panorama building in the world, designed by Robert Mitchell and built in Leicester Square, and made a fortune. Viewers flocked to pay 3 shillings to stand on a central platform under a skylight, which offered an even lighting, and get an experience that was "panoramic" (an adjective that didn't appear in print until 1813). The extended meaning of a "comprehensive survey" of a subject followed sooner, in 1801. Visitors to Barker's semi-circular Panorama of London, painted as if viewed from the roof of Albion Mills on the South Bank, could purchase a series of six prints that modestly recalled the experience; end-to-end the prints stretched 3.25 meters.

Barker's accomplishment involved sophisticated manipulations of perspective not encountered in the panorama's predecessors, the wide-angle "prospect" of a city familiar since the 16th century, or Wenceslas Hollar's Long View of London from Bankside, etched on several contiguous sheets. When Barker first patented his technique in 1787, he had given it a French title: La Nature à Coup d’ Oeil ("Nature at a glance"). A sensibility to the "picturesque" was developing among the educated class, and as they toured picturesque districts, like the Lake District, they might have in the carriage with them a large lens set in a picture frame, a "landscape glass" that would contract a wide view into a "picture" when held at arm's length.

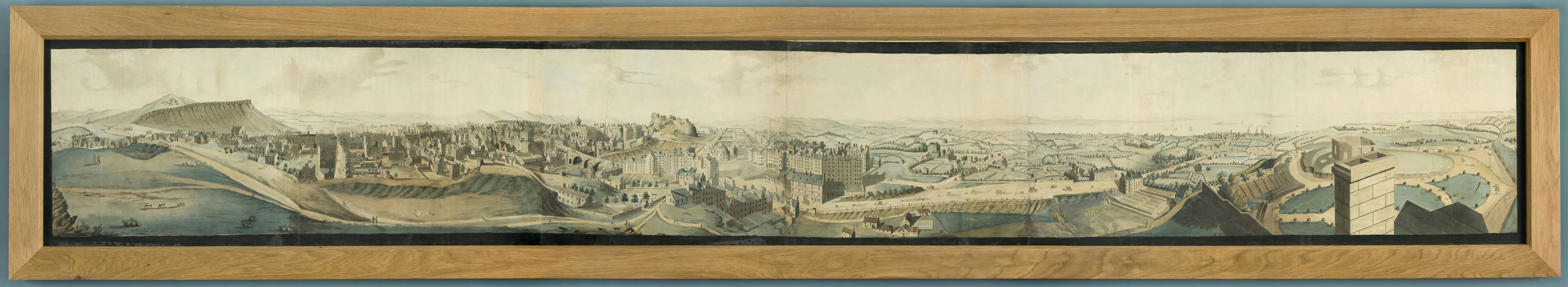
Barker's first Panorama, Edinburgh from Calton Hill, 1789–1790

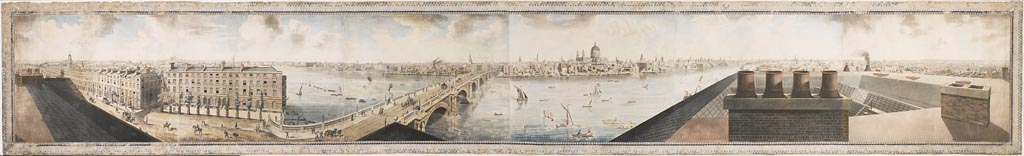
Barker's London from the Roof of Albion Mills of 1792, from the top of the Albion Mills

Barker's Panorama was hugely successful and spawned a series of "immersive" panoramas: the Museum of London's curators found mention of 126 panoramas that were exhibited between 1793 and 1863. In Europe, panoramas were created of historical events and battles, notably by the Russian painter Franz Roubaud. Most major European cities featured more than one purpose-built structure hosting panoramas. These large fixed-circle panoramas declined in popularity in the latter third of the nineteenth century, though in the United States they experienced a partial revival; in this period, they were more commonly referred to as cycloramas.

In Britain, and particularly in the US, the panoramic ideal was intensified by unrolling a canvas-backed scroll past the viewer in a Moving Panorama (noted in the 1840s), an alteration of an idea that was familiar in the hand-held landscape scrolls of Song dynasty. Such panoramas were eventually eclipsed by moving pictures (see motion picture). The similar diorama, essentially an elaborate scene in an artificially-lit room-sized box, shown in Paris and taken to London in 1823, is credited to the inventive Louis Daguerre, who had trained with a painter of panoramas. Barker died 8 April 1806, and was buried at Lambeth, Surrey.

== Family ==
One of his sons, Henry Aston Barker, was also an artist and assisted with and then carried on his father's profession of painting and exhibiting panoramas. The eldest son, Thomas Edward Barker, though not an artist, also helped run the family's business, then, in 1801, set up a rival panorama exhibition with artist Ramsay Richard Reinagle at 168/9 The Strand, London.

== See also ==
- Panorama
- Panoramic painting
- International Panorama Council
