= Route panorama =

Continuous 2D image that includes all the scenes visible from a route

Route panorama is a continuous 2D image that includes all the scenes visible from a route, as it first appeared in Zheng and Tsuji's work of panoramic views in 1990.

== Overview ==
Different from a local panorama at a static viewpoint, a digital route panorama is constructed from partial views at consecutive viewpoints along a path. A general approach to obtain such a complete route panorama is to use a line camera or slit camera mounted on a vehicle moving along the path smoothly. The camera scans temporal scenes in the side direction of the path and connect them to the spatial image. This is realized by a program that processes temporal image data or video data in a computer. The route panorama can extend to a long distance for indexing scenes and navigation on the Internet. The long image can further be transmitted to and be scrolled on computer screens or handheld devices as moving panorama for access of geospatial locations, navigation, georeferencing, etc.

Mathematically, the route panorama employs a parallel-and-perspective projection that is a continuous and extreme case of multi-perspective view to pixel lines. It may have the aspect ratio of an object different from what a normal perspective projection generates. In addition, a video camcorder is used to produce the route panorama by taking only one pixel line in the video frame at a time with the auto-exposure function of the camcorder and shaking removal function using the inter-frame matching.

If the depth of scenes from the path has a dominant layer, a route panorama can also be created on that layer by stitching discrete photos consecutively taken along the path using Photomontage. Under the same circumstance, a dynamic slit selected in the video frame can generate a route panorama with less shape distortion.

== Gallery ==
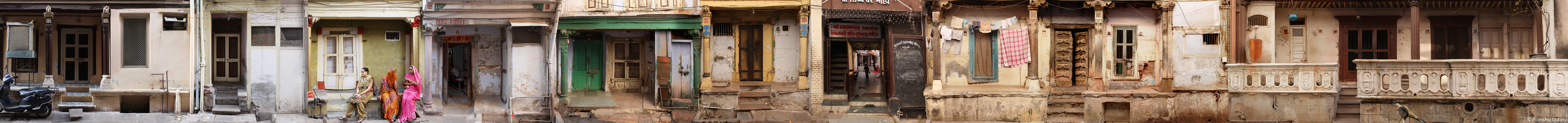
A multipoint panorama of one of the street of the old city Ahmedabad
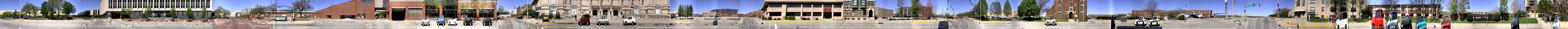
A route panorama image captured with a video camera on a vehicle along Alabama St. Indianapolis, Indiana, United States
Ancient painting scroll: Along the River During the Qingming Festival, 18th-century remake of a 12th-century original by Chinese artist Zhang Zeduan.

== See also ==
- Panorama
- Mareorama – Moving panorama
- Moving panorama
- Scroll
- Digital camera: Line-scan camera system
- Push broom scanner
