= Richard Risley Carlisle =

American gymnast & acrobat (1814–1874)

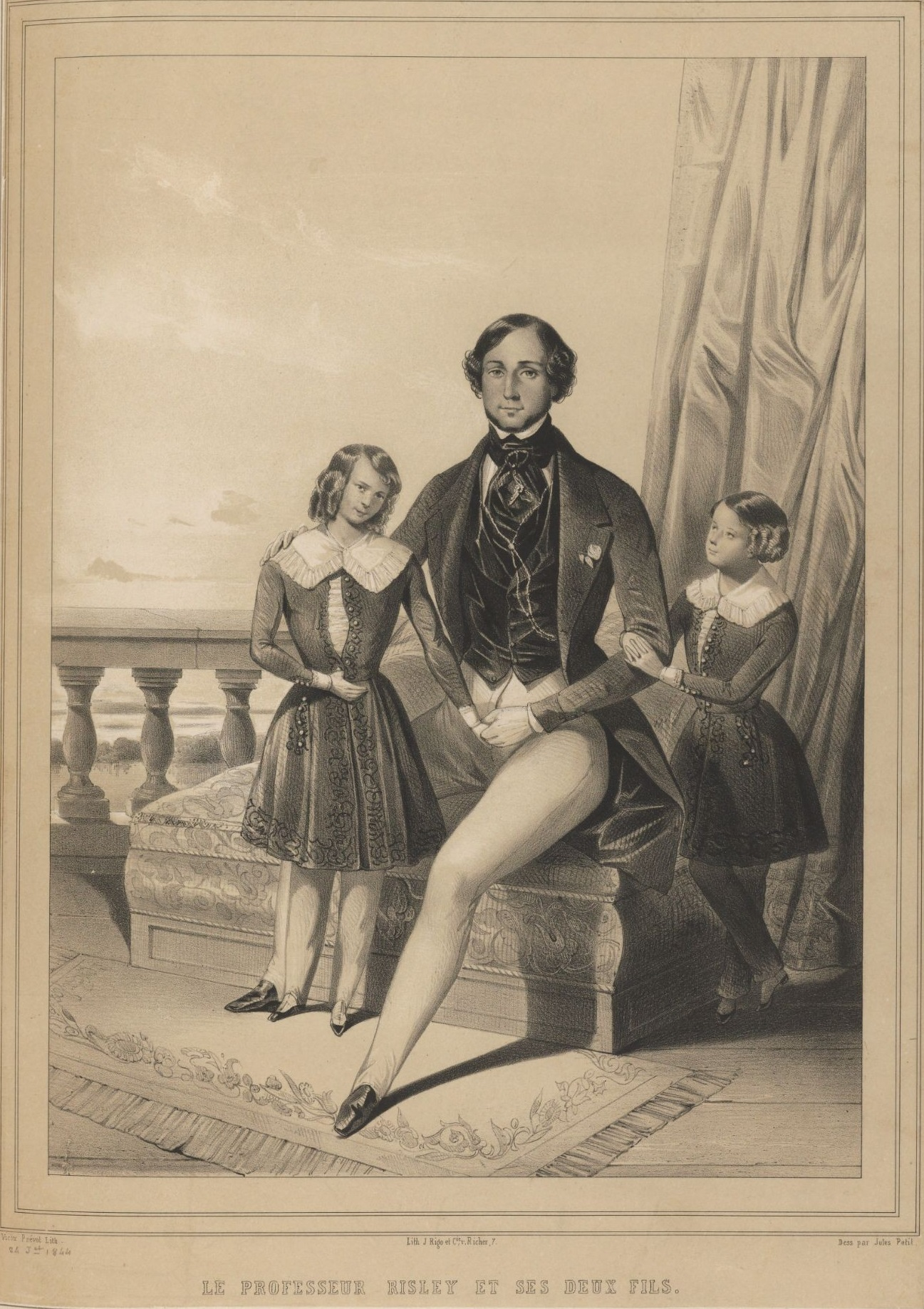
Risley and his two children, 1844

Richard Risley Carlisle (1814–1874) was an American gymnast and acrobat who often performed as Professor Risley. He is known for developing a circus act of juggling with the feet known as the Risley act. An inveterate traveler to Europe, Australia and East Asia and serial entrepreneur, Risley also notably brought a Japanese circus act to America in the 1860s.

== Biography ==
Richard Risley Carlisle was born in Burlington County, New Jersey in 1814. On October 15, 1833, he married Rebecca C. Willits of Philadelphia, though her father sued him a year later for unknown reasons. In 1835, he offered $2,000 to purchase 160 acres from Lazarus Bourissa, a Potowatami, to establish what is now New Carlisle, Indiana. His first noted performance as a circus performer was in 1841; he came to be known professionally under the name "Professor Risley". In January 1846 while on tour in Europe, Carlisle appeared before Queen Victoria and Prince Albert at the Theatre Royal, Drury Lane.

Some time before 1850, Carlisle teamed with John Rowson Smith to establish a traveling panorama display of the Mississippi River to compete with John Banvard. A minor rivalry between the two acts soon arose, with Banvard calling Smith and Carlisle imposters; they in turn referred to the "crude efforts of the uncultivated artist" Banvard. Banvard issued a pamphlet in 1849 warning the public about the "incorrect imitations which have been hurriedly prepared by parties of unprincipled persons". George Catlin accused Banvard of copying his own paintings, but Banvard responded that his panorama was copied by Catlin for use by Smith and Risley.

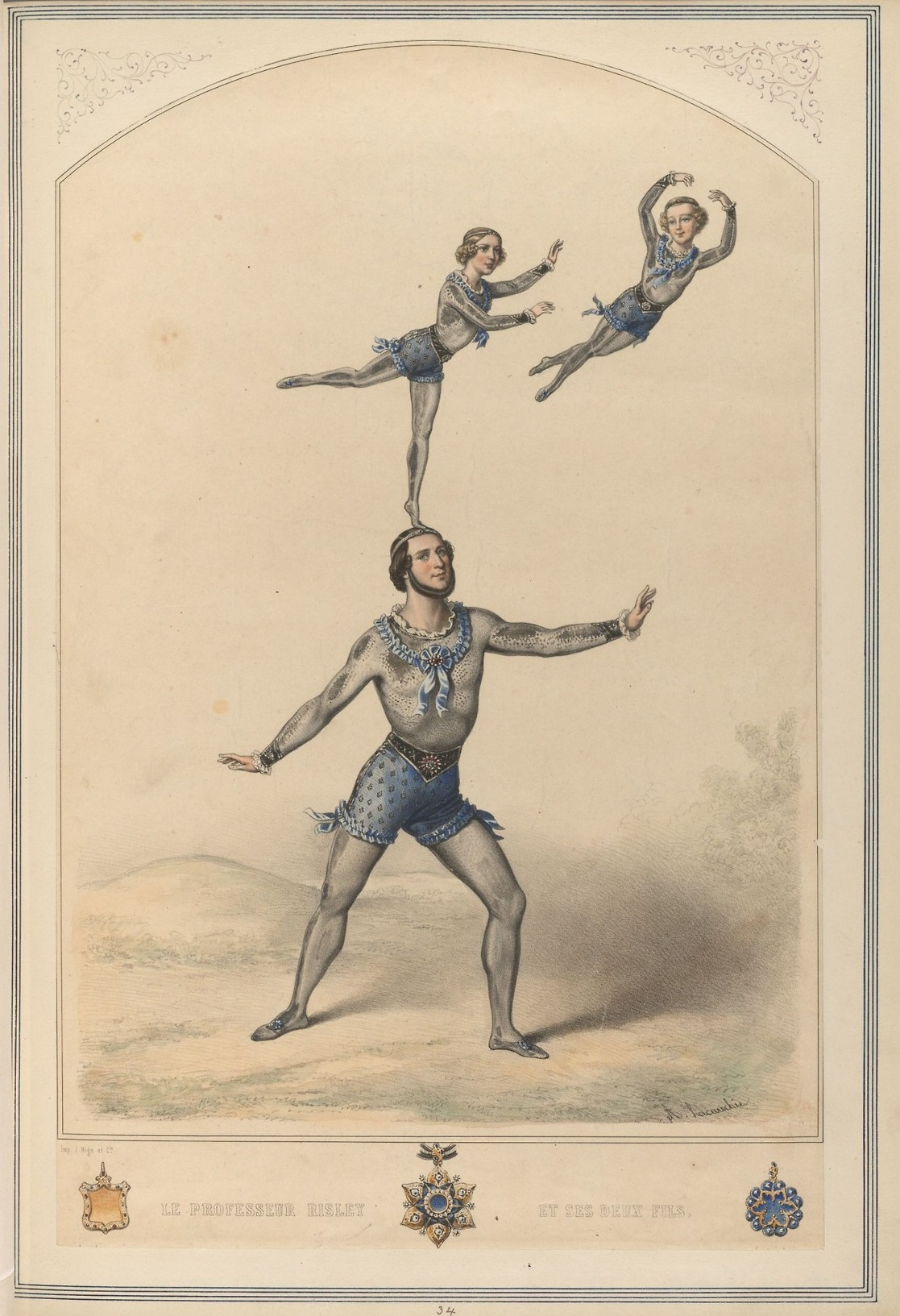
"Professor Risley" performing with his children

As a circus performer, Carlisle is known for establishing the Risley act; he is noted as being the first to perform this act in the Guinness Book of World Records. The act involves the performer lying on his or her back on a chair and juggling children with the feet, an act also used by the Hanlon-Lees and others. It has alternatively been referred to as the "Risley business" or the "Risley stunt". Carlisle developed this act as early as 1840–1841. The act has since come to refer to juggling anything with the feet while lying on one's back.

In 1856 Carlisle travelled to Australia, reportedly to prospect for gold, then on to New Zealand. In 1861 he was in Singapore. In 1864 he moved to Shanghai, again staging circus performances, before moving in the same year to Yokohama, Japan where he was recognized as the first Western professional acrobat in the country. As a serial entrepreneur Carlisle saw an opportunity to develop a dairy business in the recently opened treaty port; after importing a small herd of cows from San Francisco and ice from Harbin he sold milk and gained renown as the first seller of ice cream in Japan. Carlisle returned to performing and stage management and moved back to the United States, bringing with him a troupe of traditional Japanese acrobats. The Imperial Japanese Troupe, as they were called, had their East Coast debut in Philadelphia and performed there for a month in 1867. In April 1869 he and his company were the first to appear at the newly reopened Hippotheatron in New York.

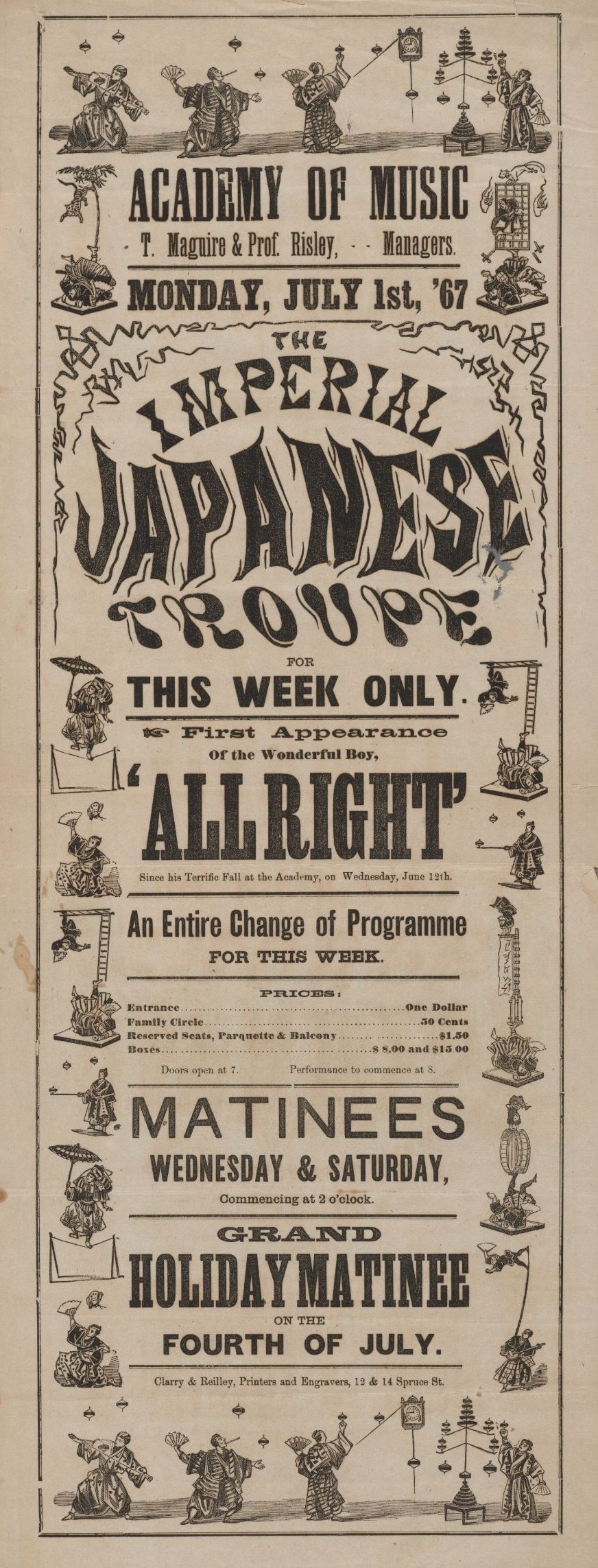
Handbill advertisement for The Imperial Japanese Troupe at the Academy of Music (1867 July 1)

Carlisle died May 25, 1874. He was buried at Mount Moriah Cemetery in Philadelphia.
