= Myriorama (cards) =

19th century set of illustrated cards

Myriorama cards - 19th century - these came from a set of 18

Myriorama originally referred to a set of illustrated cards that 19th-century children could arrange and re-arrange, forming different pictures. Later in the century the name was also applied to performances using a sequence of visual effects to entertain and inform an audience. The word myriorama was invented to mean myriad pictures, following the model of panorama, diorama, cosmorama and other novelties. These were all part of a wider interest in viewing landscape as panorama, and in new ways of presenting "spectacular" scenes.

== History ==
The early myrioramas were cards with people, buildings, and other images on compatible backgrounds, and could be laid out in any order, allowing a child to create a variety of imaginary landscapes. Jean-Pierre Brès, a French children's writer, published an early version which he described as a polyoptic picture (tableau polyoptique) in the early 19th century, and John Clark of London took up the idea and designed a set of cards he called a myriorama. Clark's "second series" myriorama, an "Italian landscape", was produced in 1824, the same year as a similar set of English cards called a panoramacopia created by drawing teacher T.T.Dales.

Later, in the 19th century, the term myriorama was used by the Poole Brothers to describe their popular moving panoramas.

== After 1950 ==
Reproductions of period cards are sometimes found, marketed alongside other "traditional toys". Ralph Hyde published Panoramania! in 1988, reproducing several myrioramas as well as other, uncut panoramas. Various contemporary artists have used the idea as inspiration for work they have named myriorama.

== See also ==
- Moving panorama
- Panoramic painting

== Sources ==
- Jill Shefrin, Educational Games for Children in Georgian England, Princeton Library Journal
- French National Library
- Cambridge University Library
