= Panorama =

Wide-angle view or representation of a physical space

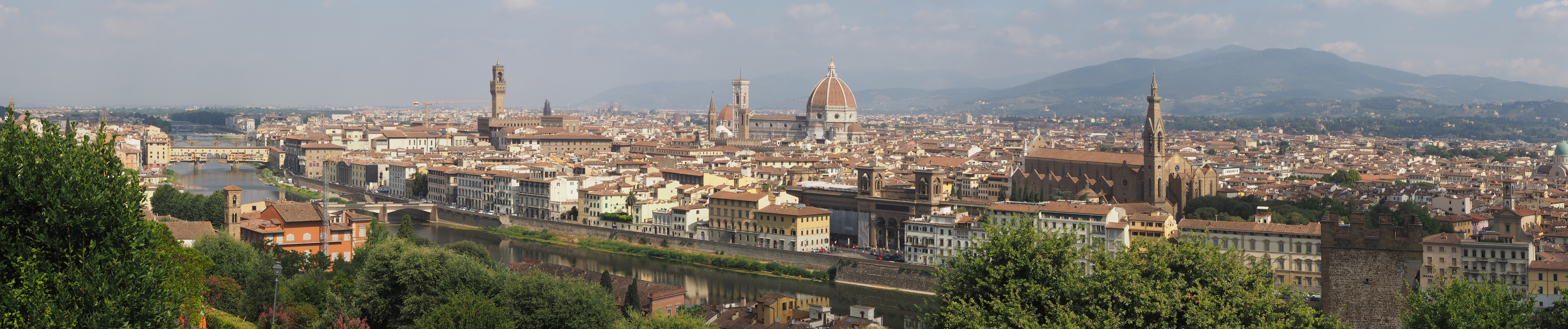
Panorama of Florence, Italy

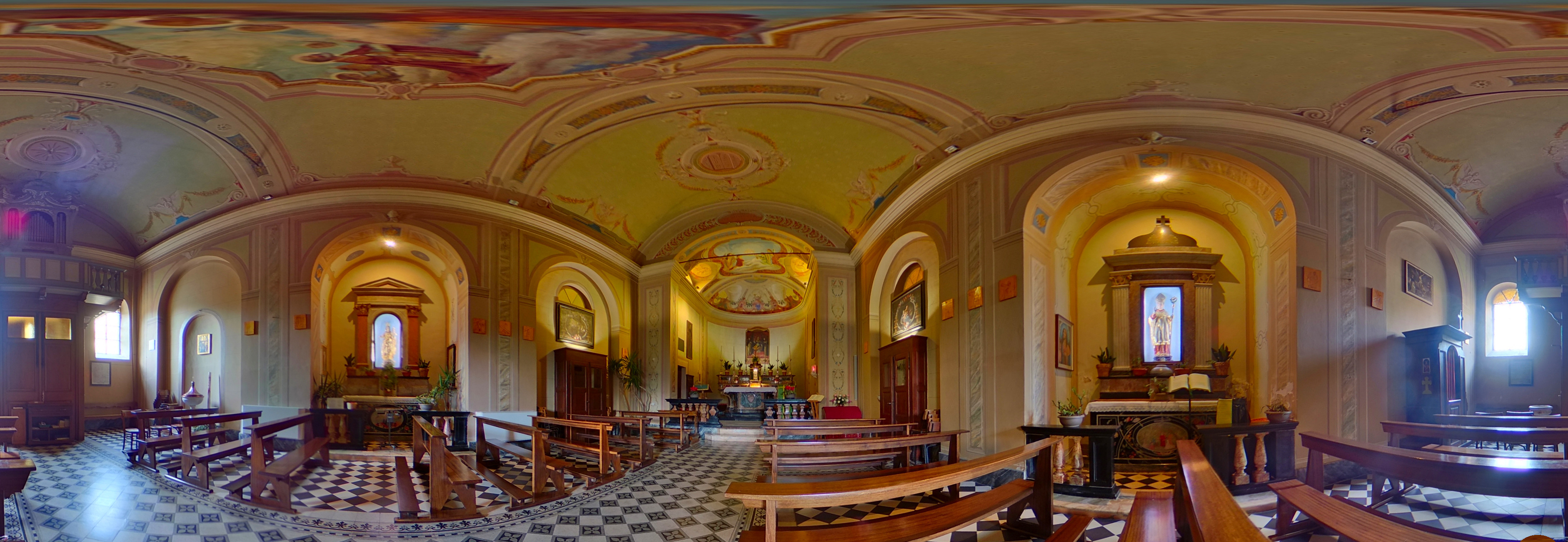
360° interior panorama of San Gregorio church in Breglia, Italy

A panorama (formed from Greek πᾶν "all" + ὅραμα "view") is any wide-angle view or representation of a physical space, whether in painting, drawing, photography (panoramic photography), film, seismic images, or 3D modeling. The word was coined in the 18th century by the English (Irish descent) painter Robert Barker to describe his panoramic paintings of Edinburgh and London. The motion-picture term panning is derived from panorama.

== History ==
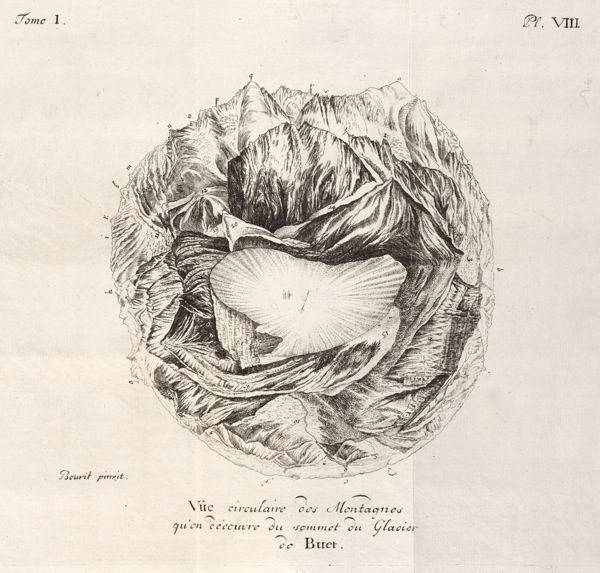
"Vue circulaire des montagnes qu'on decouvre du sommet du Glacier de Buet", from Horace-Benedict de Saussure, Voyage dans les Alpes, précédés d'un essai sur l'histoire naturelle des environs de Geneve. Neuchatel, 1779–96, pl. 8.

The device of the panorama existed in painting, particularly in murals, as early as 20 A.D., in those found in Pompeii, as a means of generating an immersive "panoptic" experience of a vista.

Cartographic experiments during the Enlightenment era preceded European panorama painting and contributed to a formative impulse toward panoramic vision and depiction.

This novel perspective was quickly conveyed to America by Benjamin Franklin who was present for the first manned balloon flight by the Montgolfier brothers in 1783, and by the American-born physician, John Jeffries who had joined French aeronaut Jean Pierre Blanchard on flights over England and the first aerial crossing of the English Channel in 1785.

== As popular spectacle ==
In the mid-19th century, panoramic paintings and models became a very popular way to represent landscapes, topographic views and historical events. Audiences of Europe in this period were thrilled by the aspect of illusion, immersed in a winding 360° panorama and given the impression of standing in a new environment. The panorama was a 360° visual medium patented under the title Apparatus for Exhibiting Pictures by the artist Robert Barker in 1787. The earliest that the word "panorama" appeared in print was on June 11, 1791, in the British newspaper The Morning Chronicle, referring to this visual spectacle. Barker created a painting, shown on a cylindrical surface and viewed from the inside, giving viewers a vantage point encompassing the entire circle of the horizon, rendering the original scene with high fidelity. The inaugural exhibition, a "View of Edinburgh" (specifically the view from the summit of Calton Hill), was first shown in that city in 1788, then transported to London in 1789. By 1793, Barker had built "The Panorama" rotunda at the center of London's entertainment district in Leicester Square, where it remained attracting visitors for 70 years, then closing in 1863, before being converted into the church of Notre Dame de France.

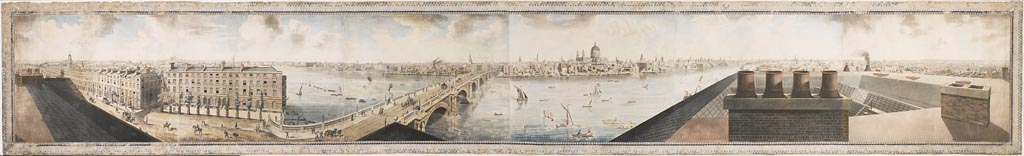
A panorama of London by Robert Barker, 1792

Inventor Sir Francis Ronalds developed a machine to remove errors in perspective that were created when a sequence of planar sketches was combined into a cylinder. It also projected the cylindrical drawing onto the wall of the rotunda at much larger scale to enable its accurate painting. The apparatus was exhibited at the Royal Polytechnic Institution in the early 1840s.

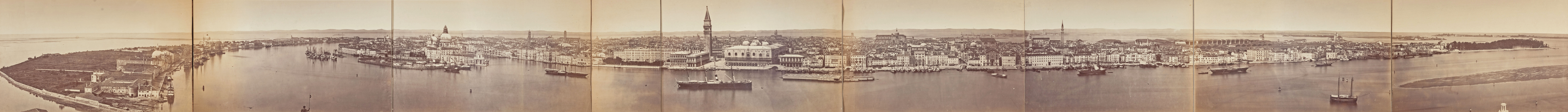
A Panorama of Venice in 1870s, Italy

Large scale installations enhance the illusion for an audience of being surrounded with a real landscape. The Bourbaki Panorama in Lucerne, Switzerland was created by Edouard Castres in 1881. The painting measures about 10 meters in height with a circumference of 112 meters. In the same year of 1881, the Dutch marine painter Hendrik Willem Mesdag created and established the Panorama Mesdag of The Hague, Netherlands, a cylindrical painting more than 14 meters high and roughly 40 meters in diameter (120 meters in circumference). In the United States of America is the Atlanta Cyclorama, depicting the Civil War Battle of Atlanta. It was first displayed in 1887, and is 42 feet high by 358 feet circumference (13 × 109 meters). Also on a gigantic scale, and still extant, is the Racławice Panorama (1893) located in Wrocław, Poland, which measures 15 × 120 meters.

In addition to these historical examples, there have been panoramas painted and installed in modern times; prominent among these is the Velaslavasay Panorama in Los Angeles, California (2004).

== Photographs ==
Panoramic photography soon came to displace painting as the most common method for creating wide views. Not long after the introduction of the Daguerreotype in 1839, photographers began assembling multiple images of a view into a single wide image. In the late 19th century, flexible film enabled the construction of panoramic cameras using curved film holders and clockwork drives to rotate the lens in an arc and thus scan an image encompassing almost 180°.

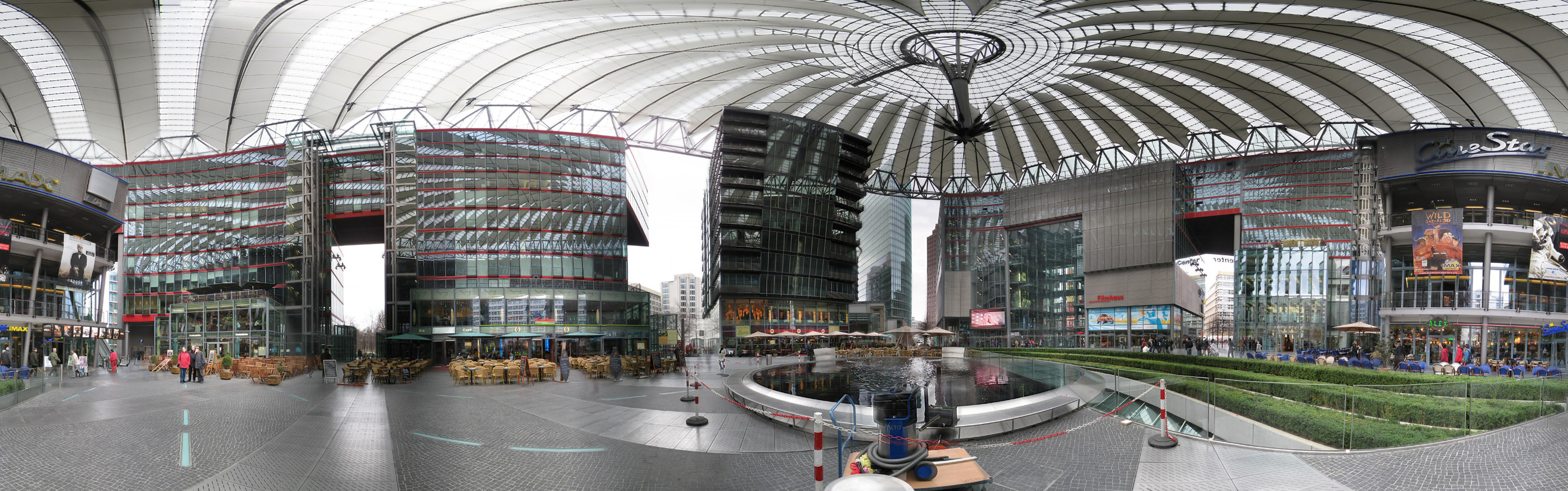
360° panorama picture of the center courtyard of The Center Potsdamer Platz in Berlin. This picture was calculated from 126 individual photos using autostitch

Pinhole cameras of a variety of constructions can be used to make panoramic images. A popular design is the "oatmeal box", a vertical cylindrical container in which the pinhole is made in one side and the film or photographic paper is wrapped around the inside wall opposite, and extending almost right to the edge of, the pinhole. This generates an egg-shaped image with more than 180° view.

Panorama taken with a drone using Adobe Lightroom Classic Photo Merge feature

Popular in the 1970s and 1980s, but now superseded by digital presentation software, Multi-image (also known as multi-image slide presentations, slide shows or diaporamas) 35mm slide projections onto one or more screens characteristically lent themselves to the wide screen panorama. They could run autonomously with silent synchronization pulses to control projector advance and fades, recorded beside an audio voice-over or music track. Precisely overlapping slides placed in slide mounts with soft-edge density masks would merge seamlessly on the screen to create the panorama. Cutting and dissolving between sequential images generated animation effects in the panorama format.

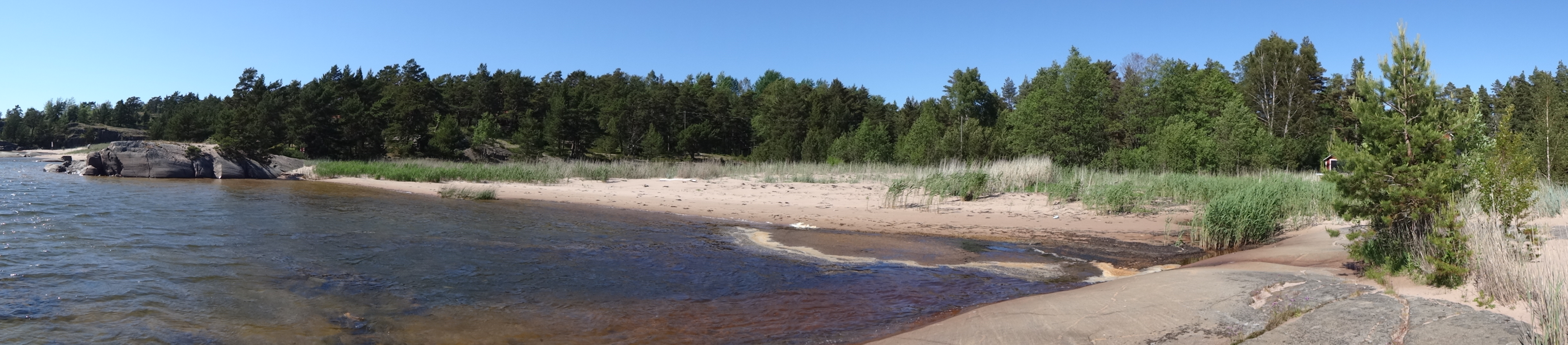
A 270° panorama of a location in Hanko, Finland, stitched "in-camera". Many modern digital cameras can automatically stitch a sequence of images shot while the camera is rotated.

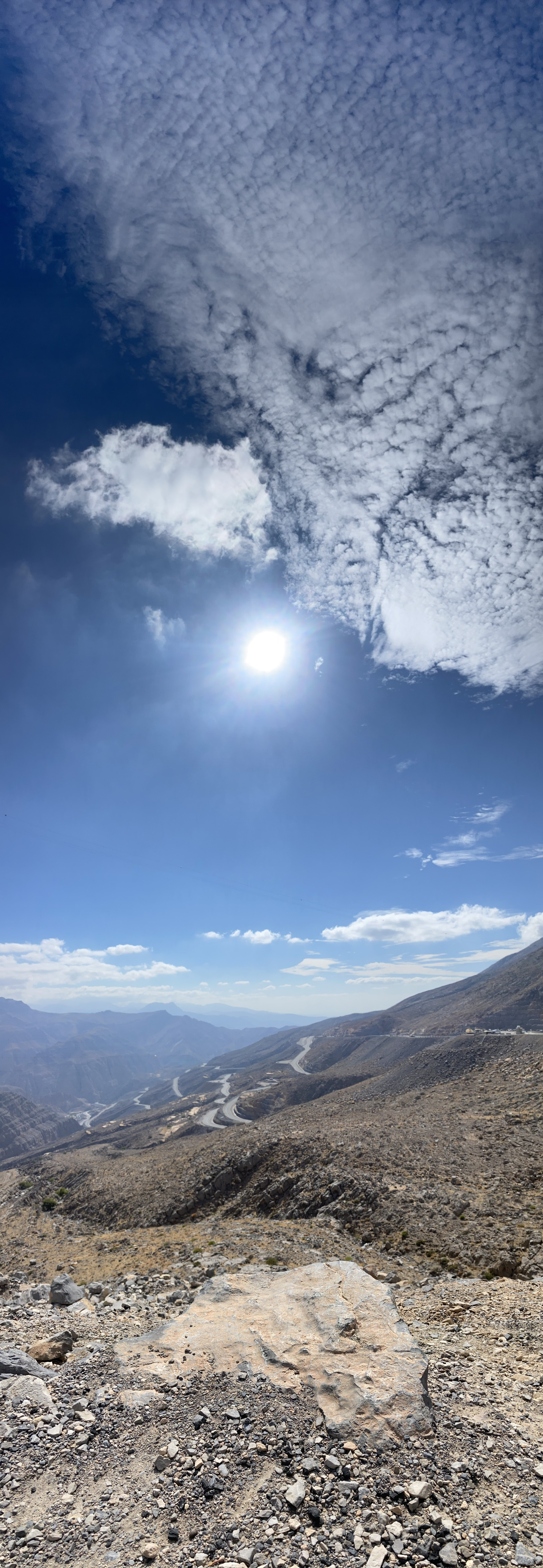
Vertical panorama of Jebel Jais on the border between Oman and United Arab Emirates

A vertical panorama or vertorama is a panorama with an upright orientation instead of a horizontal. It is created using the same techniques as when making a horizontal panorama.

=== VR photographs ===
Digital photography of the late twentieth century greatly simplified this assembly process, which is now known as image stitching. Such stitched images may even be fashioned into forms of virtual reality movies, using technologies such as QuickTime VR, Flash, Java, or even JavaScript. A rotating line camera such as the Panoscan allows the capture of high resolution panoramic images and eliminates the need for image stitching, but immersive "spherical" panorama movies (that incorporate a full 180° vertical viewing angle as well as 360° around) must be made by stitching multiple images. Stitching images together can be used to create extremely high resolution gigapixel panoramic images.

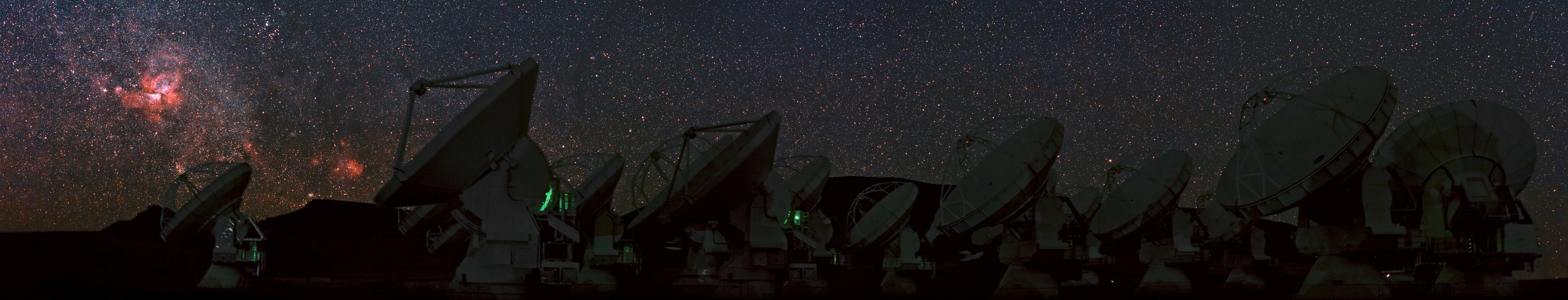
Panoramic view of the antennas of the Atacama Large Millimeter Array under the clear sky over the Chajnantor Plateau, in the Chilean Andes.

== Motion picture ==
On rare occasions, 360° panoramic movies have been constructed for specially designed display spaces—typically at theme parks, world's fairs, and museums. Starting in 1955, Disney has created 360° theaters for its parks and the Swiss Transport Museum in Lucerne, Switzerland, features a theater that is a large cylindrical space with an arrangement of screens whose bottom is several meters above the floor. Panoramic systems that are less than 360° around also exist. For example, Cinerama used a very wide curved screen, with three synchronized projectors, and IMAX Dome / OMNIMAX movies are projected on a dome above the spectators.

== Non-photographic representations ==
Panoramic representation can be generated from digital elevation models such as SRTM. In these diagrams, a panorama from any given point can be generated and imaged from the data.

== See also ==
- Circle-Vision
- Cyclorama
- Diorama
- EveryScape
- Google Street View
- International Panorama Council
- Leme panoramic camera
- Moving panorama
- Multi-image
- Overview effect
- Omnidirectional camera
- Panoramic painting
- Panoramic photography
- Panoramic tripod head
- Planetarium
- Route panorama
- Widescreen
