= Henry Lewis (artist) =

American painter

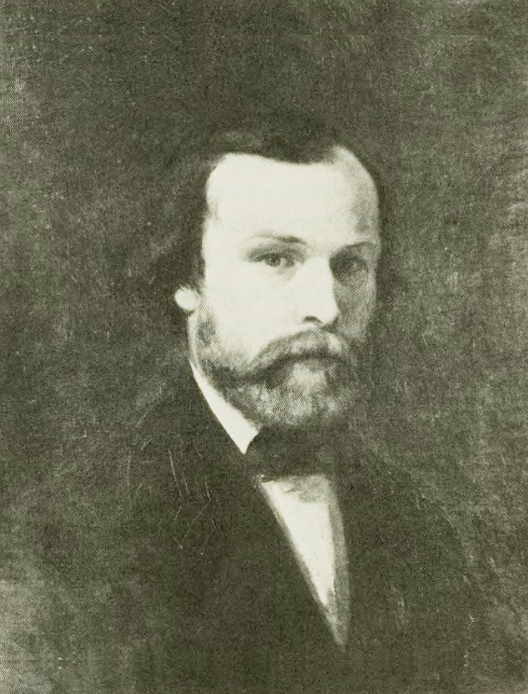
- Lewis c. 1856, from a portrait by John B. Irving II
- Born: January 12, 1819; Newport, Wales or Scarborough, North Riding of Yorkshire, England
- Died: 1904 (aged 84–85); Düsseldorf, Germany
- Notable work: Lewis' Mammoth Panorama of the Mississippi (Great National Work)

"Professor" Henry Lewis (1819–1904) was a British-born, self-taught American artist and showman, best known for his paintings of the American West.

Art historian John William Reps credited Lewis with capturing an important historical record of the Mississippi River area in the 1840s, saying that "much of what we know about the character of these raw, new communities of the frontier comes from the images Lewis created," which he called "unsurpassed in pictorial interest and antiquarian value."

== Life and career ==
Lewis was born in Newport, Wales or Scarborough, North Riding of Yorkshire, England, on January 12, 1819, according to Joseph Earl Arrington. John Graham Cooke casts doubt on Lewis's precise birthplace, but mentions Shropshire, England, as a possible birthplace, in that Lewis's father came from there.

Lewis's family immigrated about 1833 to Boston, Massachusetts, where he was apprenticed to a carpenter. At age seventeen, he moved to St. Louis, Missouri, where he worked as a carpenter and scenery painter at the St. Louis Theatre.

Between 1846 and 1848, Lewis sketched and painted hundreds of scenes of the Mississippi River. These included rare views, such as the Mormon Temple at Nauvoo, Illinois (burned 1848), and the great St. Louis Fire of 1849.

Lewis developed his sketches into his most famous work, a giant moving panorama — 12 feet by 1,325 feet — which was unrolled, with music and narration, before theater audiences in the United States and Europe. The panorama was completed in 1849, and went on tour in America under the title Lewis' Mammoth Panorama of the Mississippi (Great National Work). Lewis himself narrated the exhibition, which included a depiction of the devastating St. Louis fire of 1849 through special effects. The U.S. tour included more than a dozen cities including Chicago, Washington, D.C., Boston, and New York. Much of the work was based on his own sketches from traveling the upper Mississippi in 1846 to 1848, but he also commissioned fellow artist Charles Rogers to sketch the lower Mississippi from St. Louis to the Gulf of Mexico, and purchased 79 sketches from Minnesota artist Seth Eastman, using both of these as sources for his panorama design.

When Lewis' European tour of his panorama reached Düsseldorf, Germany in 1853, Lewis decided to resettle in the city, which was at the time an important center of the arts. He published a book with 80 illustrations based on his panorama, titled Das Illustirte Mississippithal, or, in its never-completed English edition, The Illustrated Mississippi: From the Falls of St. Anthony to the Gulf of Mexico, in 1857. The book was "a financial disaster", according to Reps, never coming out in an English edition and selling perhaps 300 copies. The panorama itself was sold to another exhibitor in 1857, who intended to show it in Calcutta (now Kolkata), India. It has since been lost.

Lewis remained in Germany for the rest of his life, achieving modest success as an artist and also worked for the U.S. consulate. He returned to America only once, briefly, to visit family and friends in Iowa and Missouri.

Lewis died in 1904 in Düsseldorf.

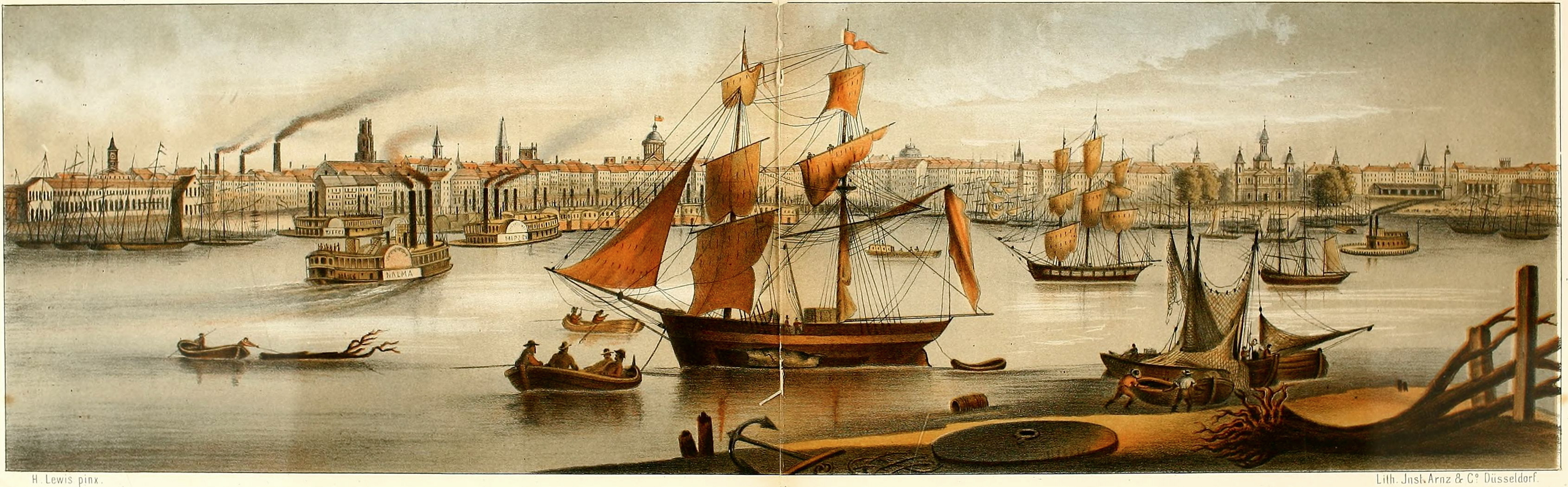
"New-Orleans (Louisiana)." Lithograph based on a view from Lewis's moving panorama.

== Gallery ==
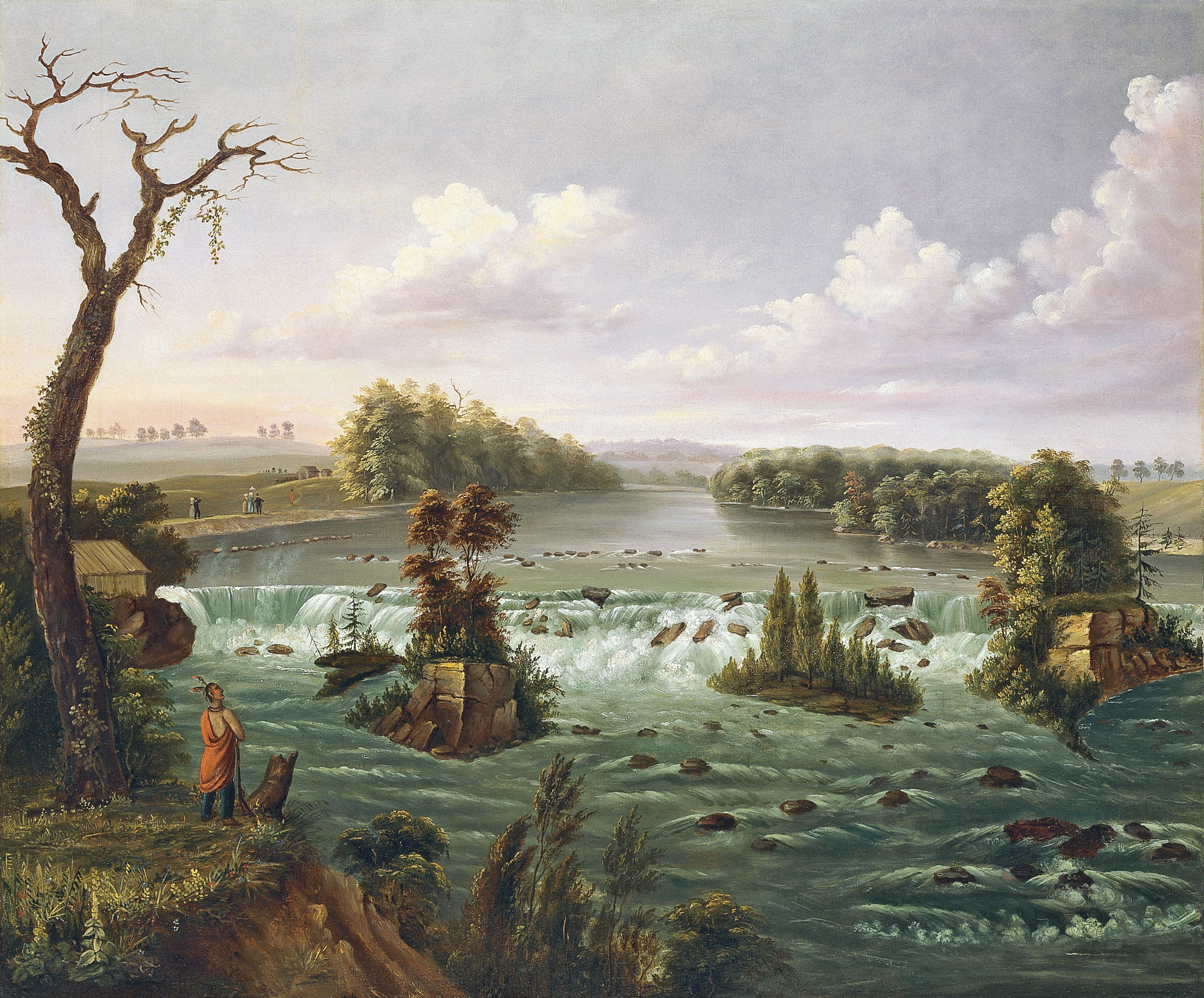
The Falls of Saint Anthony, Alto Mississippi, Henry Lewis, 1847. Thyssen-Bornemisza Museum

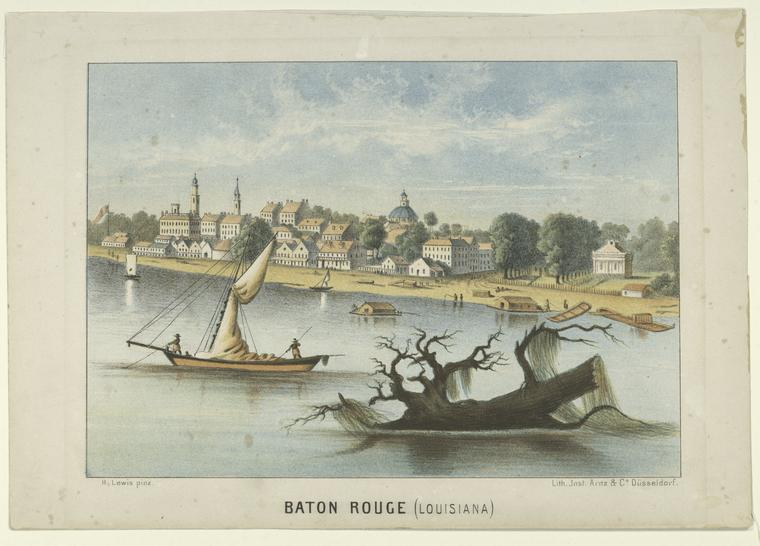
View of Baton Rouge, Louisiana, from the Mississippi River, 1840s

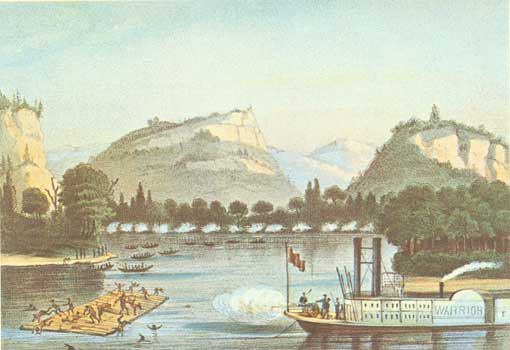
1832 Battle of Bad Axe and the steamboat Warrior

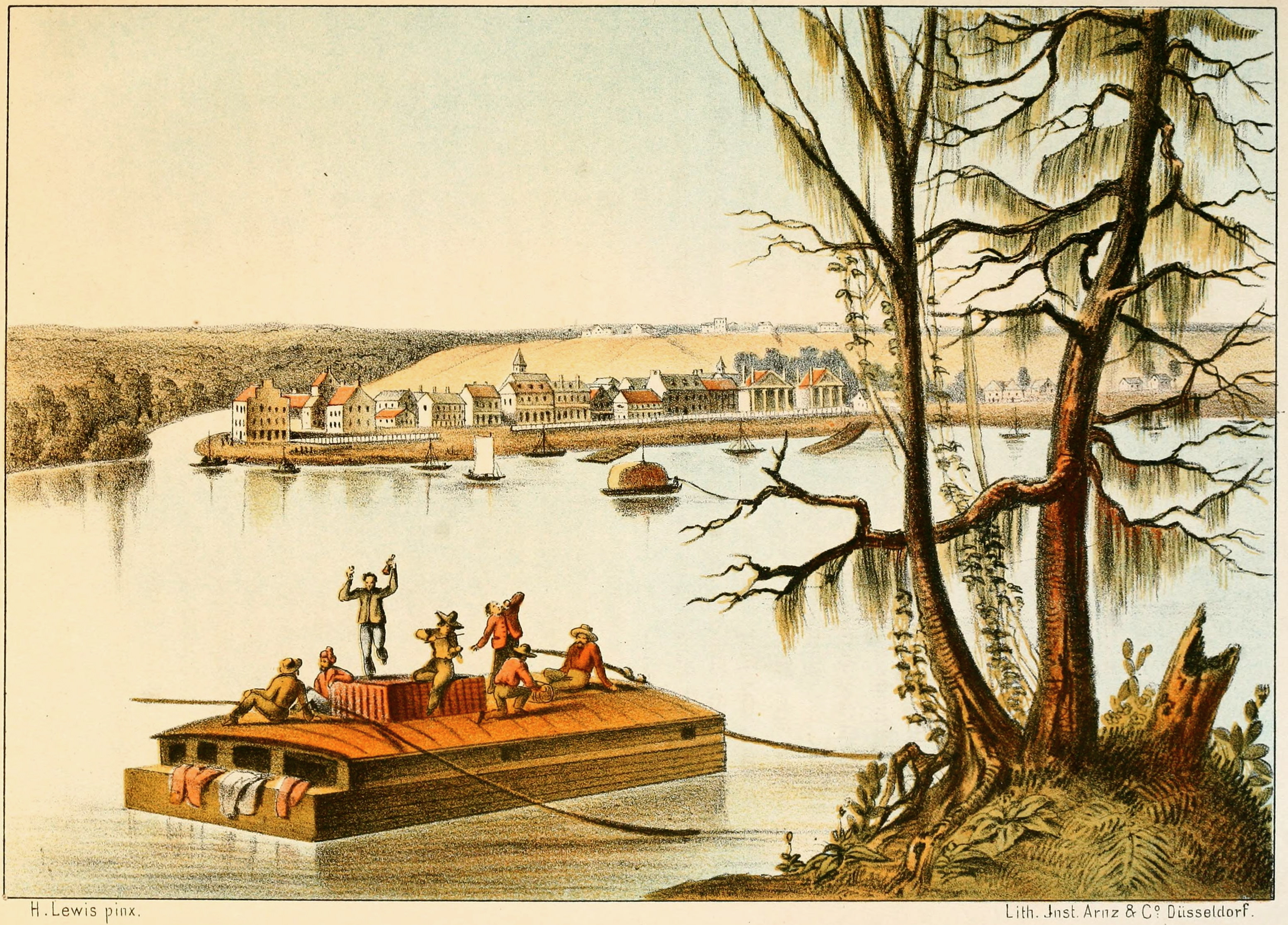
Bayou Sacra, Louisiana, 1840s

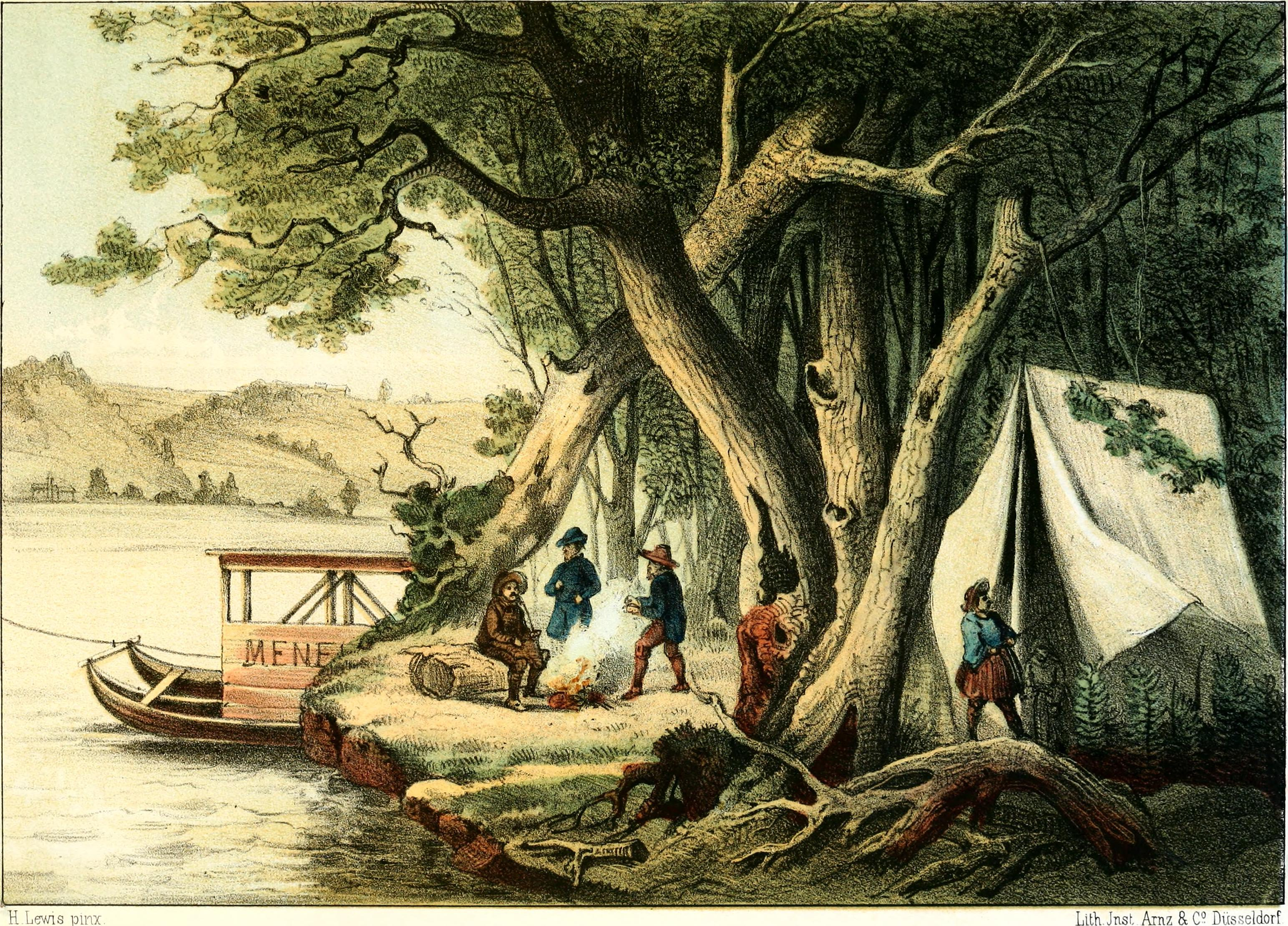
Mississippi Valley from 80 Views Taken from Nature from the Falls at St. Anthony to the Gulf of Mexico

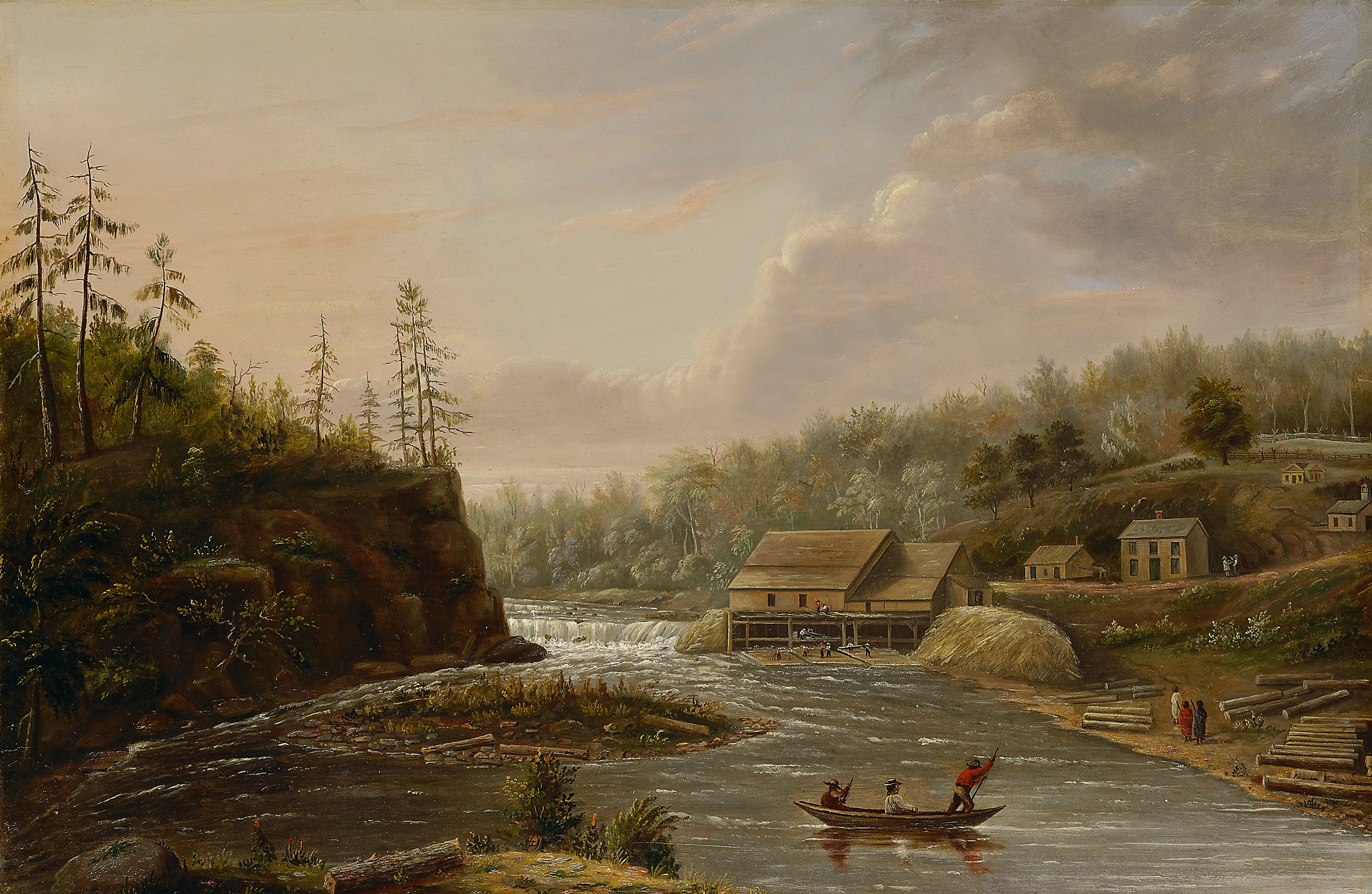
Cheever's Mill on the St. Croix River, 1847

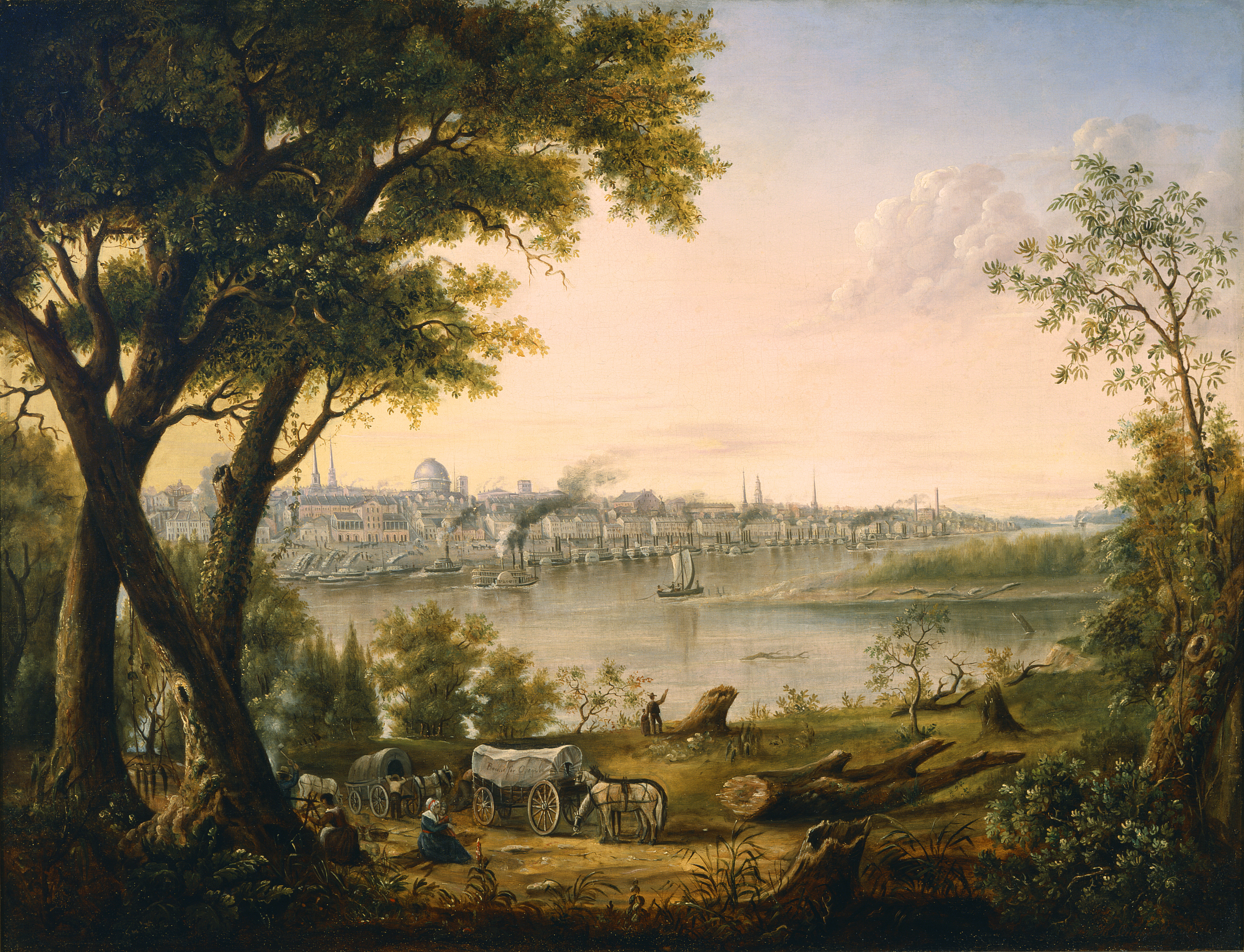
Saint Louis in 1846

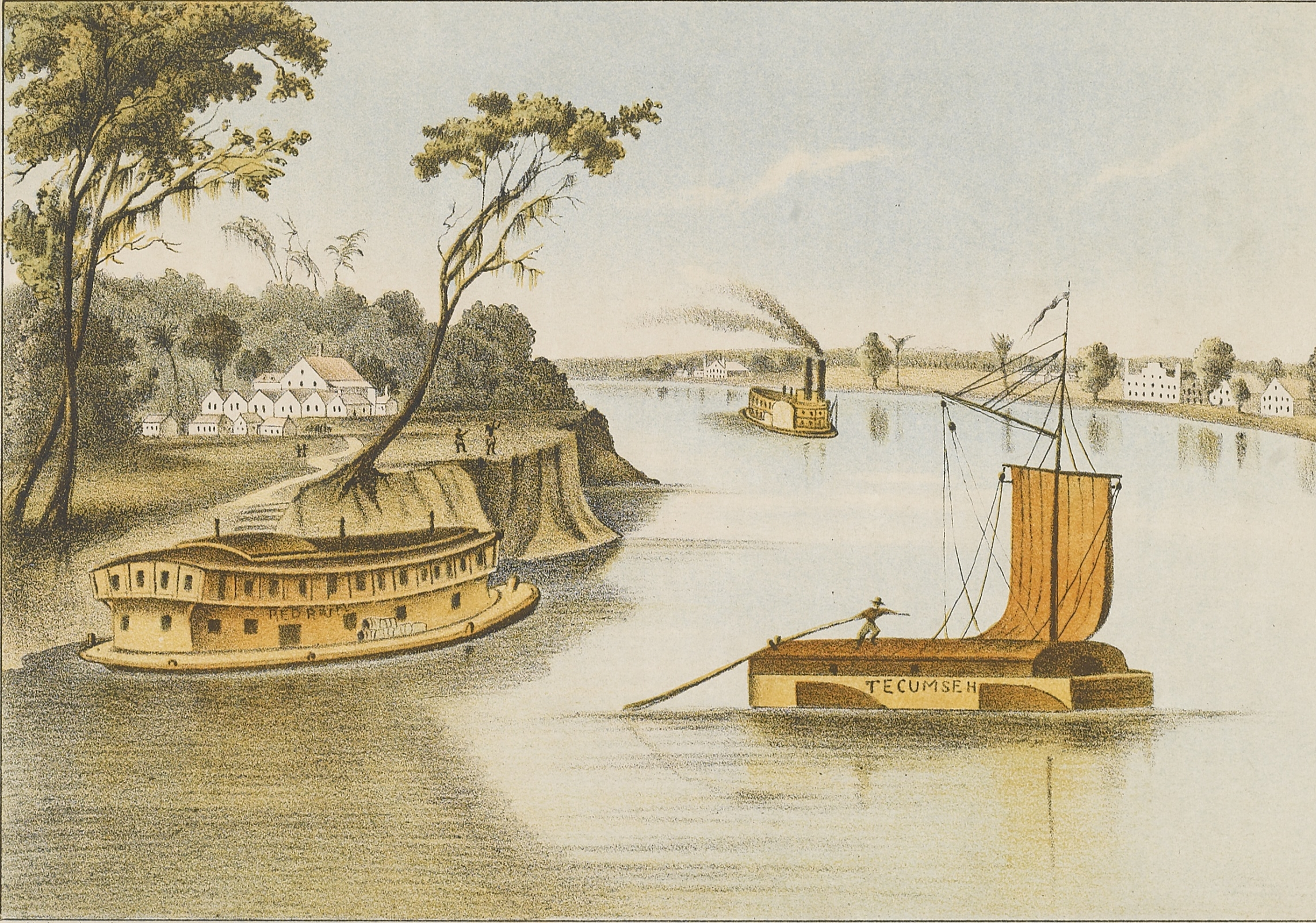
Mouth of the Red River, c. 1854 to 1858

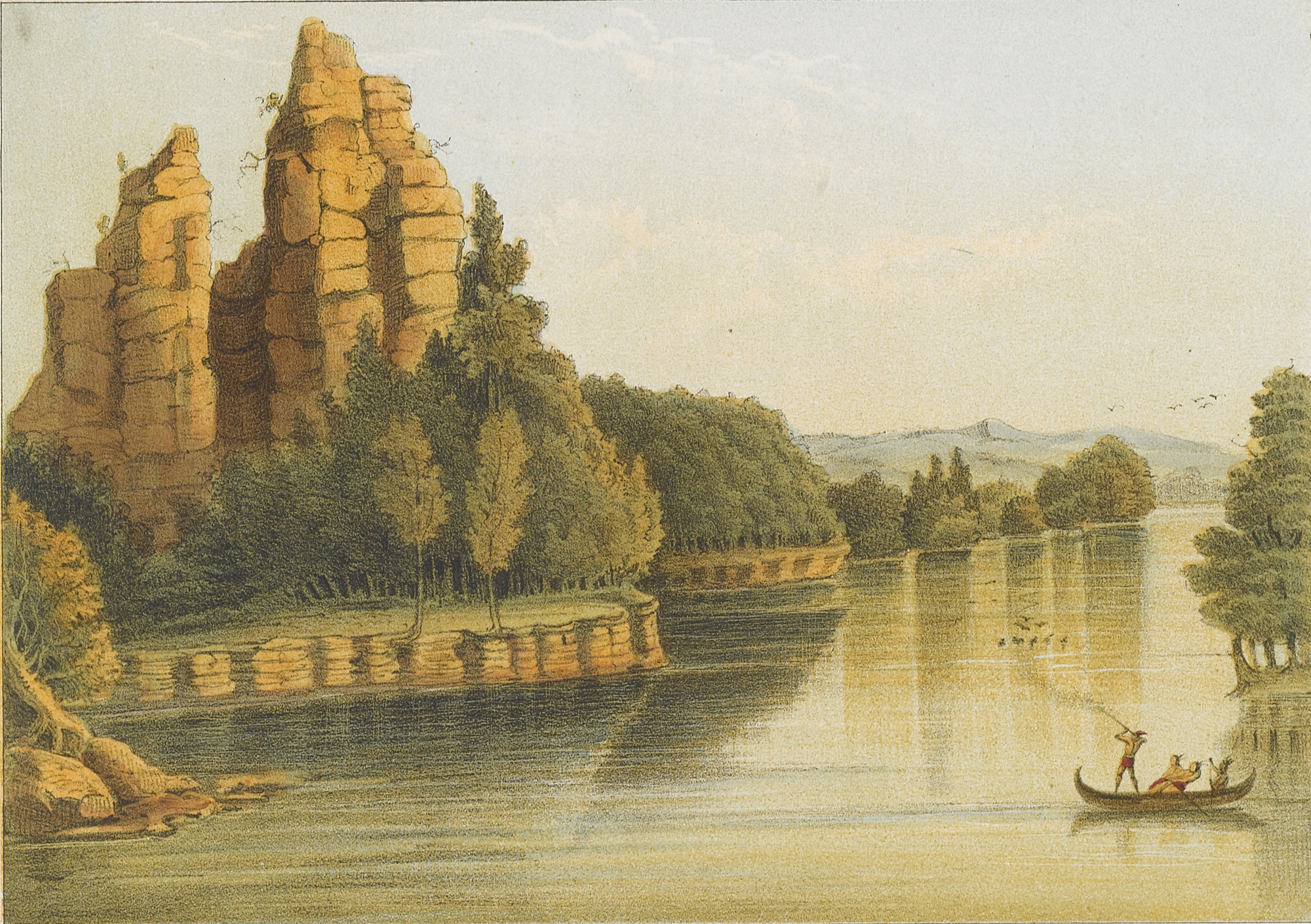
The Indians Look-Out, c. 1854 to 1858

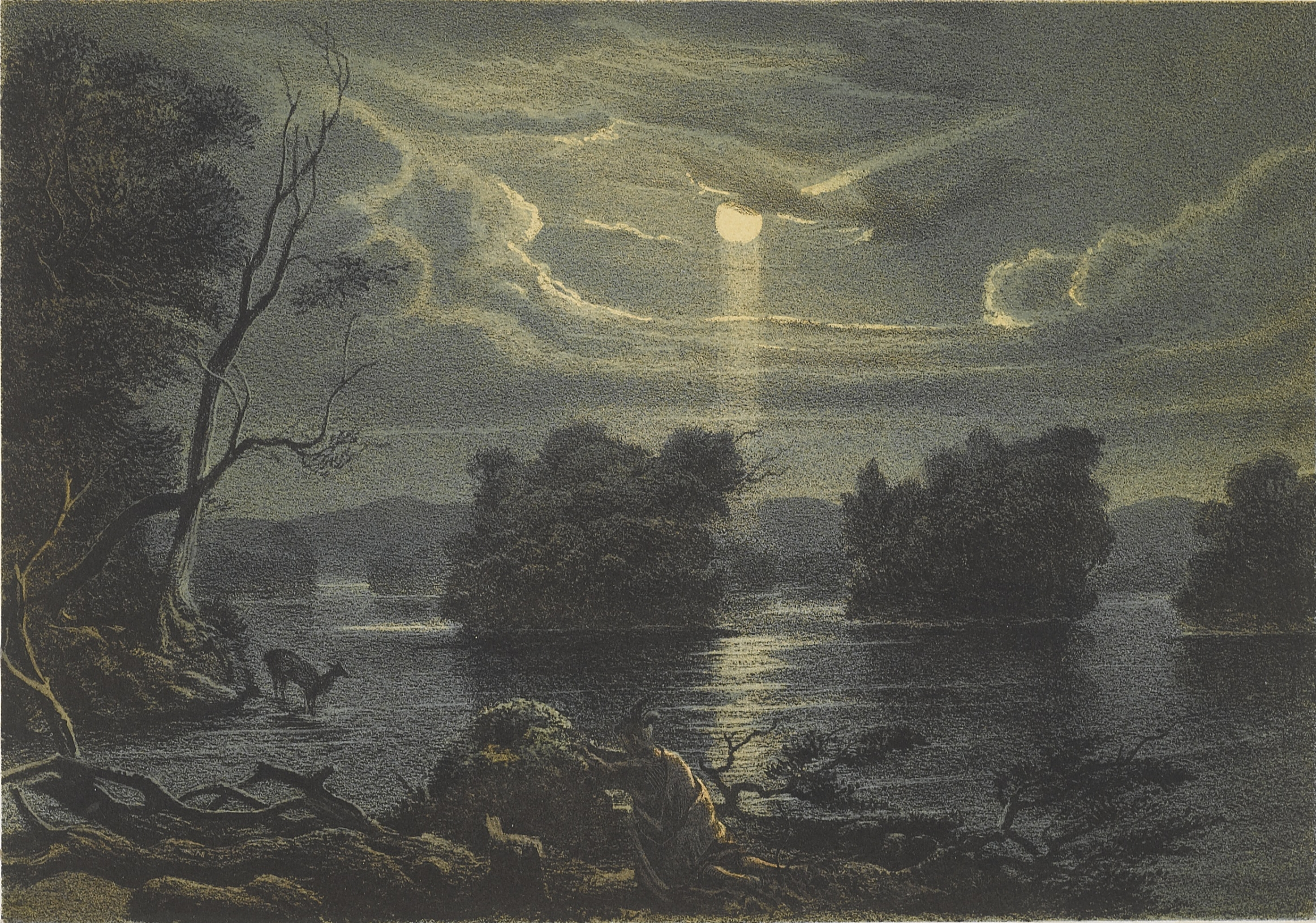
Hunting the Deer by Moonlight, c. 1854 to 1858
