= Wocher Panorama =

1814 painting by Marquard Wocher

The Wocher Panorama, also known as the Thun Panorama, is a panoramic painting depicting the city of Thun. Created by the artist Marquard Wocher in 1814, it was the first panorama in Switzerland. It is on display at Schadau Castle and is owned by the Gottfried Keller Foundation. The painting is about 7.5m tall and 38m wide and is the oldest cyclorama in the world.

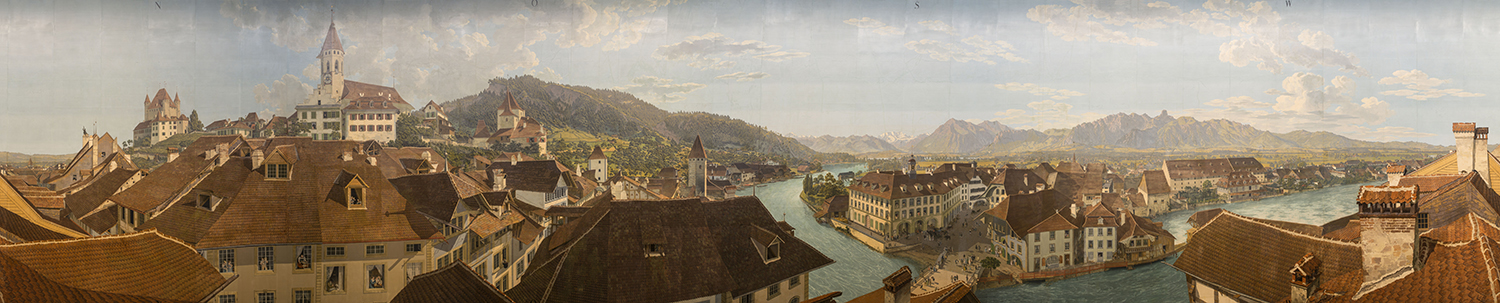
Thun Panorama

== History ==
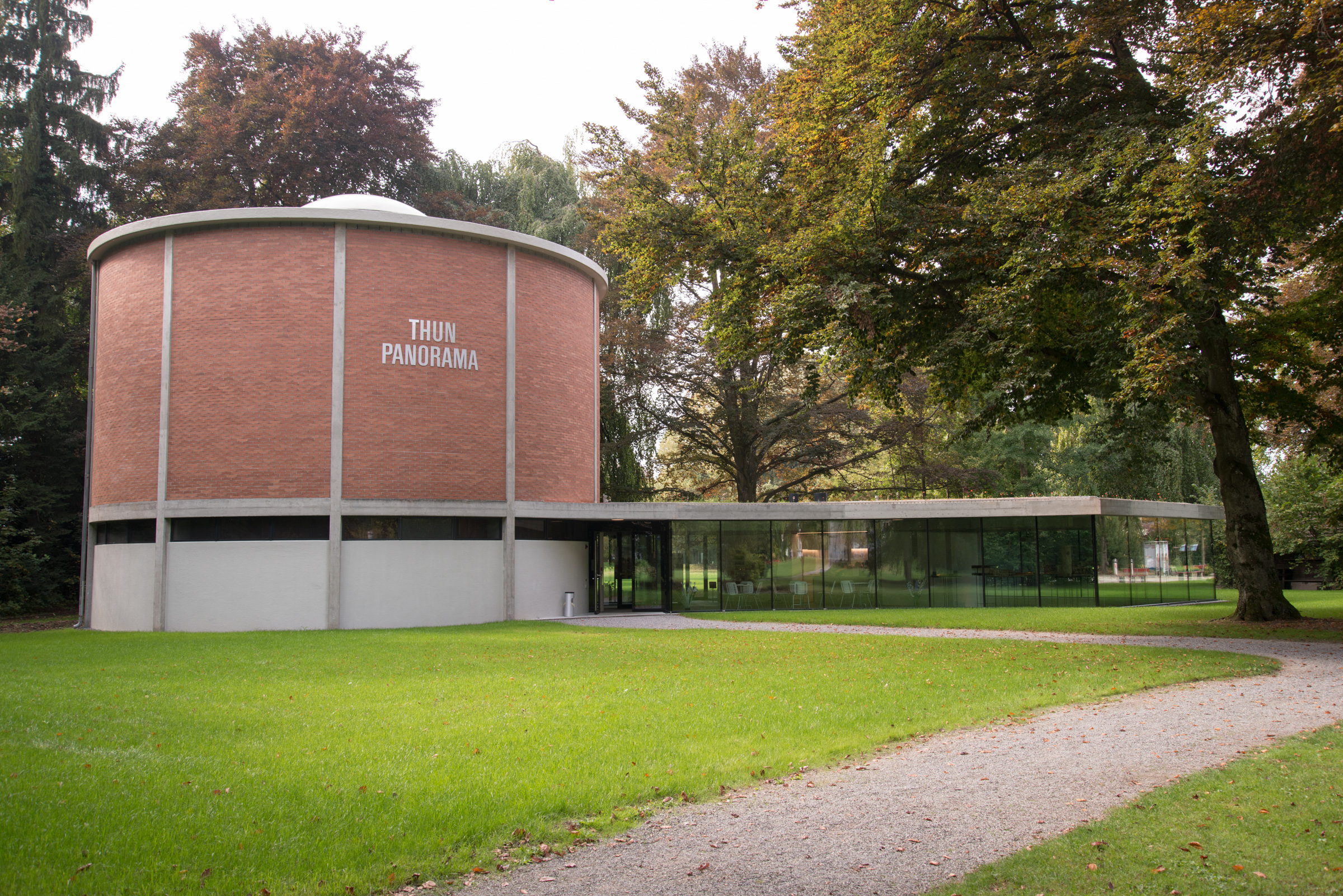
Exterior view of the Wocher Panorama, 2014

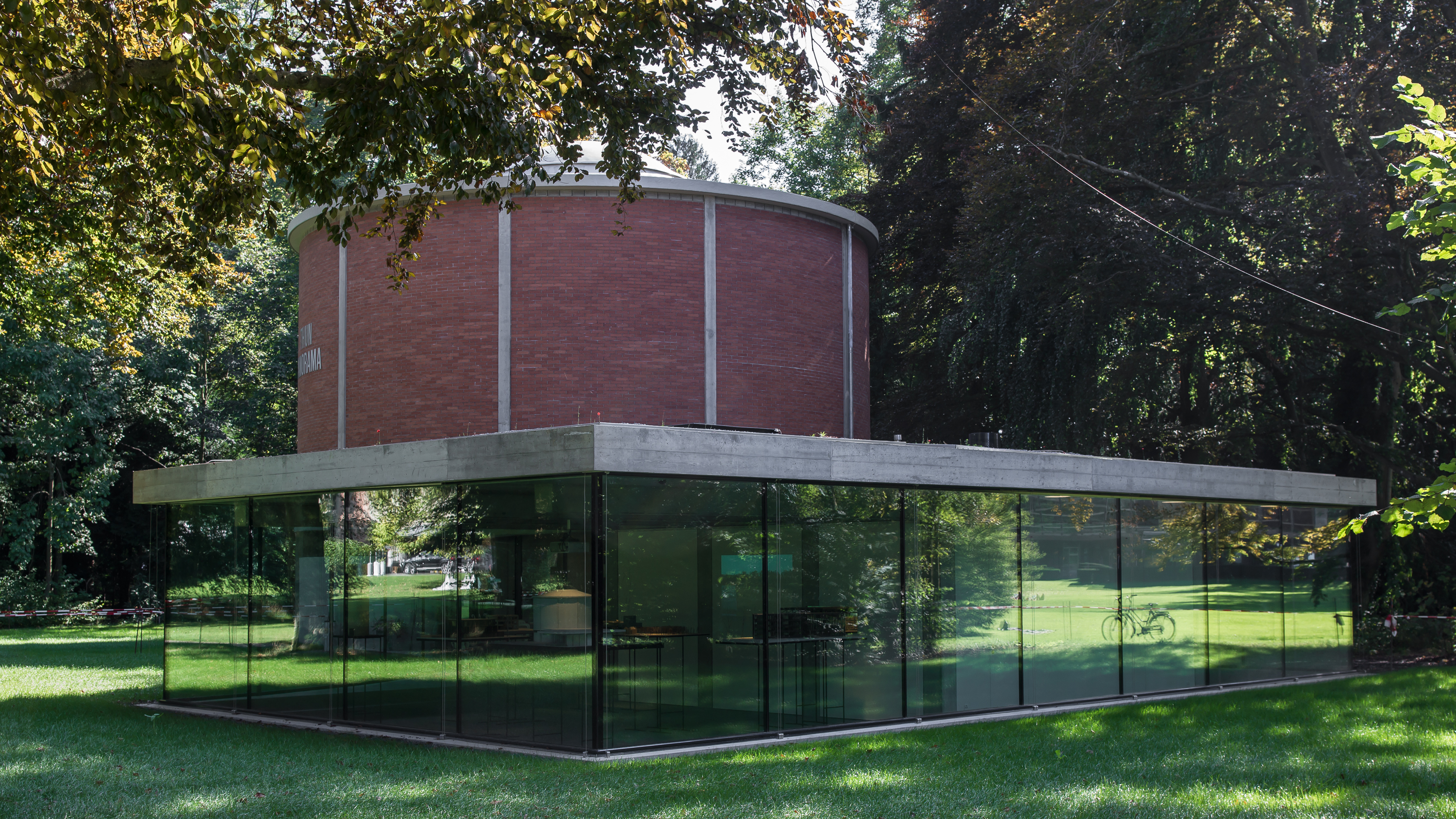
Extension by Graber & Steiger

Wocher began to publish sketches of Thun and its surroundings in 1804. Using these sketches, he painted the panorama from 1809 to 1814. The painting depicts the city of Thun, the mountain range of Stockhorn, further the Niesen, Blüemlisalp, Jungfrau and a part of Lake Thun. It is believed that Marquard Wocher portrayed himself as a man walking on the main place.

It was initially presented from 1814, but after Wocher’s death, it was sold, inherited and given away. It was rediscovered in the 1950s. The painting was first restored from 1958 to 1959 by Hans Fischer thanks to the Gottfried Keller Foundation. The panorama was installed in a new rotunda designed by Karl Keller and reopened in 1961. The painting was restored again in 2014 because of high humidity. An extension by Graber & Steiger was opened on March 28, 2015.

== Bibliography ==
- Ganz, Paul Leonhard. Das Rundbild der Stadt Thun. Das älteste erhaltene Panorama der Welt von Marquard Wocher (1760-1830). Basel: Gesellschaft für schweizerische Kunstgeschichte, 1975.
- Kunstmuseum Thun (ed.). Marquard Wocher – Das Panorama von Thun. Basel: Christoph Merian Verlag, 2009, ISBN 978-3-85616-463-8.
- Steiger-Bay, H. Albert. Marquard Wocher und sein Panorama von Thun. In: Zeitschrift für schweizerische Archäologie und Kunstgeschichte vol. 11, 1950, pp. 43–53 (Digitalisat).

== See also ==
- Cyclorama
- Panoramic painting
