= Von Allmen =

Swiss-German surname

von Allmen is a Swiss German surname originating from the Middle High German word alm, meaning "mountain pasture" or "common pastureland". Notable people with the surname include:

- Beat von Allmen (born 1941), Swiss alpine skier
- Franjo von Allmen (born 2001), Swiss alpine skier
- Heinz von Allmen (1913–2003), Swiss alpine and cross-country skier
- Patrick von Allmen (born 1985), Swiss luger
- Peter von Allmen (born 1978), Swiss cross-country skier

== See also ==
- Von Allmen Dairy Farm House, historic property in Louisville, Kentucky, U.S.
