= Marquard Wocher =

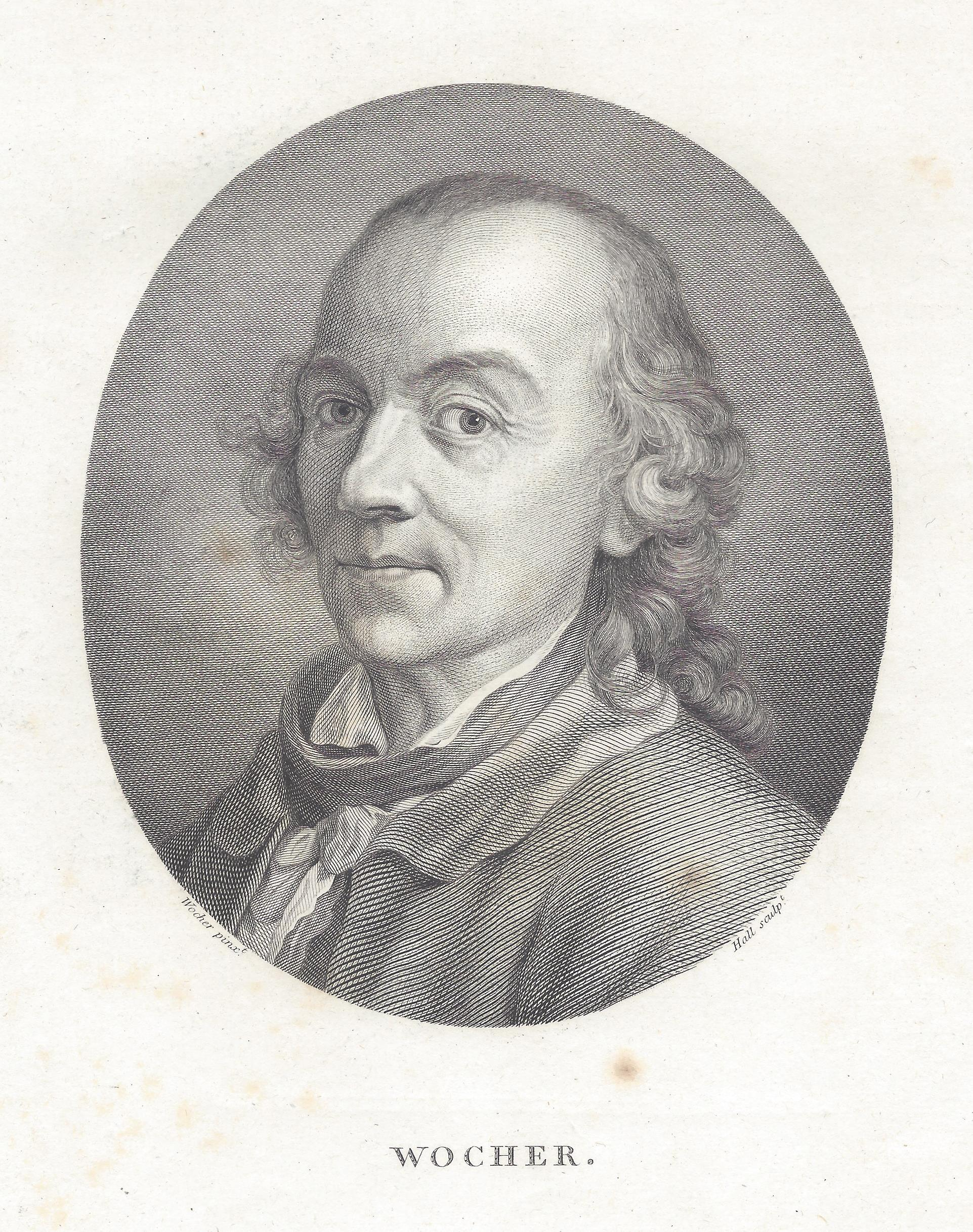
Marquard Wocher by John Hall

Marquard Wocher (7 September 1769, Mimmenhausen, Germany – 1830, Basel, Switzerland) was a German painter who spent most of his life in Switzerland. He is known for the Wocher Panorama, a cyclorama of Thun, one of the few still existing cycloramas in the world and the oldest still existing.

== Early life and education ==
Marquard Wocher was born on 7 September 1760 in the village Mimmenhausen near Salem, Holy Roman Empire as the son of the painter Tiberius Wocher. His father settled to Bern, Marquard followed him soon and was trained as a painter by him. For a short while he was employed at the workshop of the painter Johann Ludwig Aeberli, who introduced him to Johann Wolfgang von Goethe in 1779. In 1782 he eventually installed himself in Basel.

== Professional career ==
He created the seals for the Helvetic Republic in 1798. Initially mainly known for his portraits and miniatures, Wocher began to release sketches of the city of Thun in 1804. In 1809 he built a tower in which he began painting the panorama. It had 14 sides, had a height of about 19.5 meters and a diameter of 13.5. Between 1809 and 1814 he painted the panorama on a canvas of 7.40 meters height and about 38 meters breadth. The painting depicts the city of Thun, the mountain range of Stockhorn, further the Niesen, Blüemlisalp, Jungfrau and a part of Lake Thun. In 1814 Wocher announced the inauguration of the panorama and invited the public. The panorama was visited by guests from all countries in Europe, but also countries from America. Prominent visitors were Empress Marie Louise or the Grand Duke Michael of Russia. But the maintenance of the panorama was expensive and Wocher was also not able to sell it until he died.

Since 1961 the Panorama is accessible again in the Schadau-Park at the shores of Lake Thun.

== Gallery ==
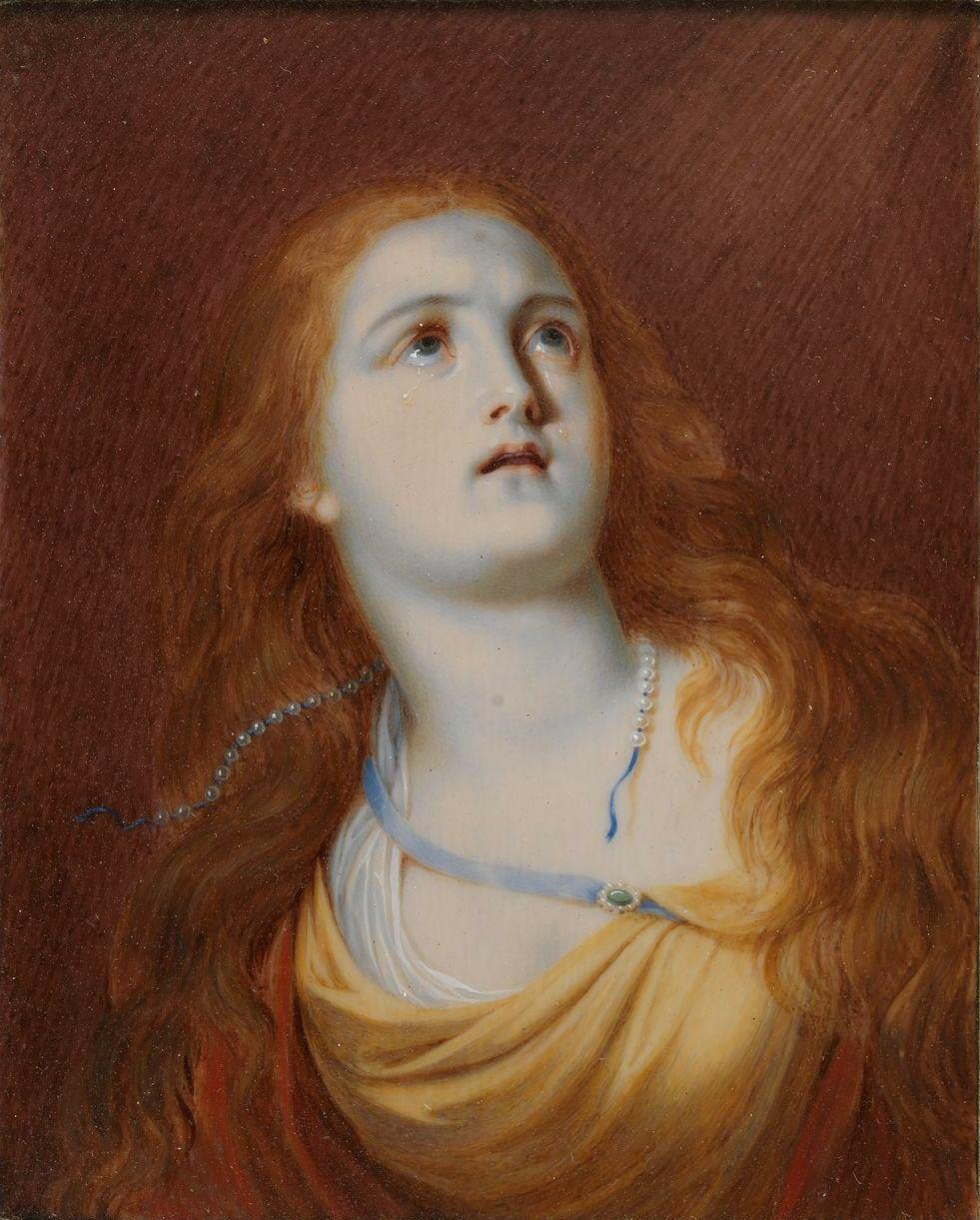
Mary Magdalene penitent after Guido Reni by Marquard Wocher

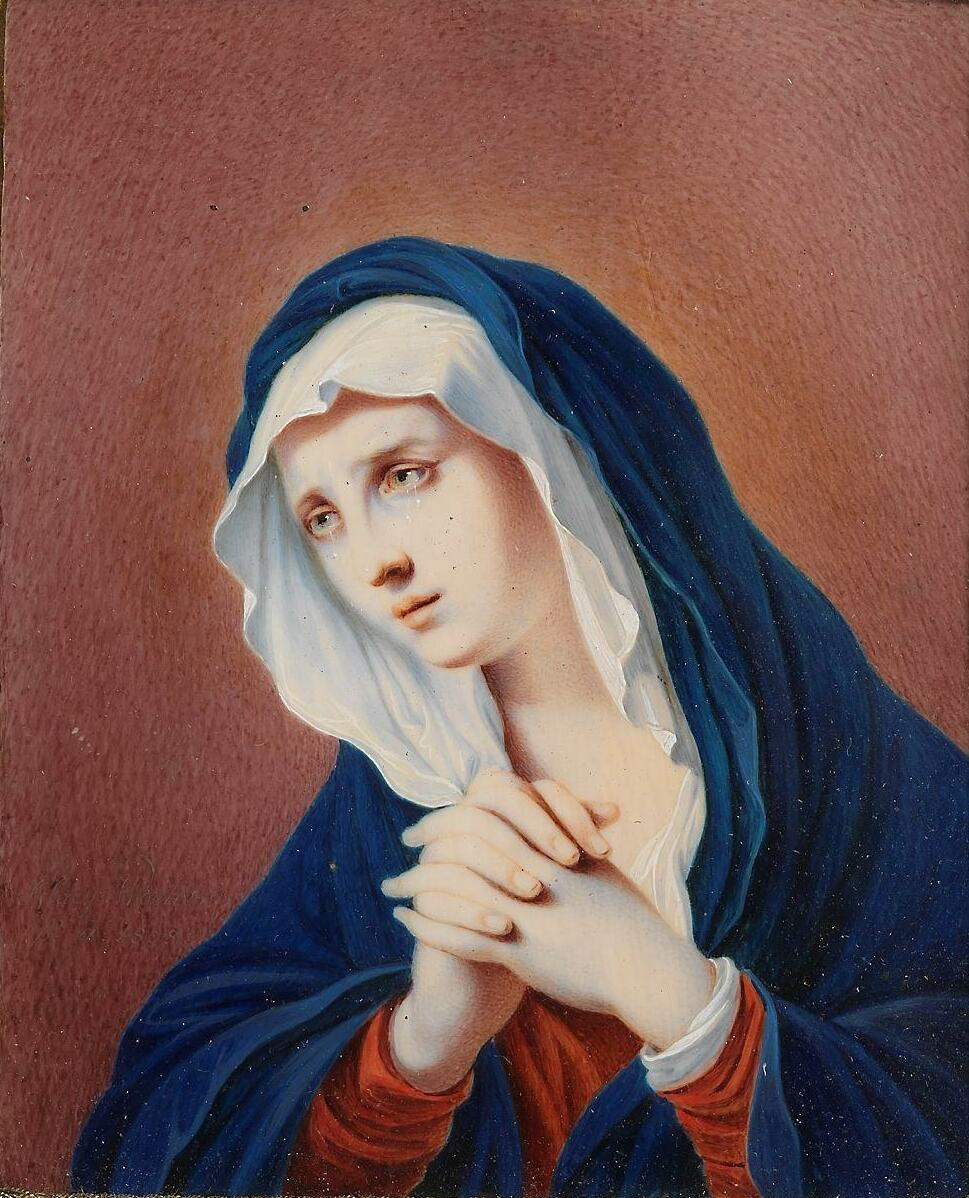
Our Lady of sorrows after Carlo Dolci by Marquard Wocher

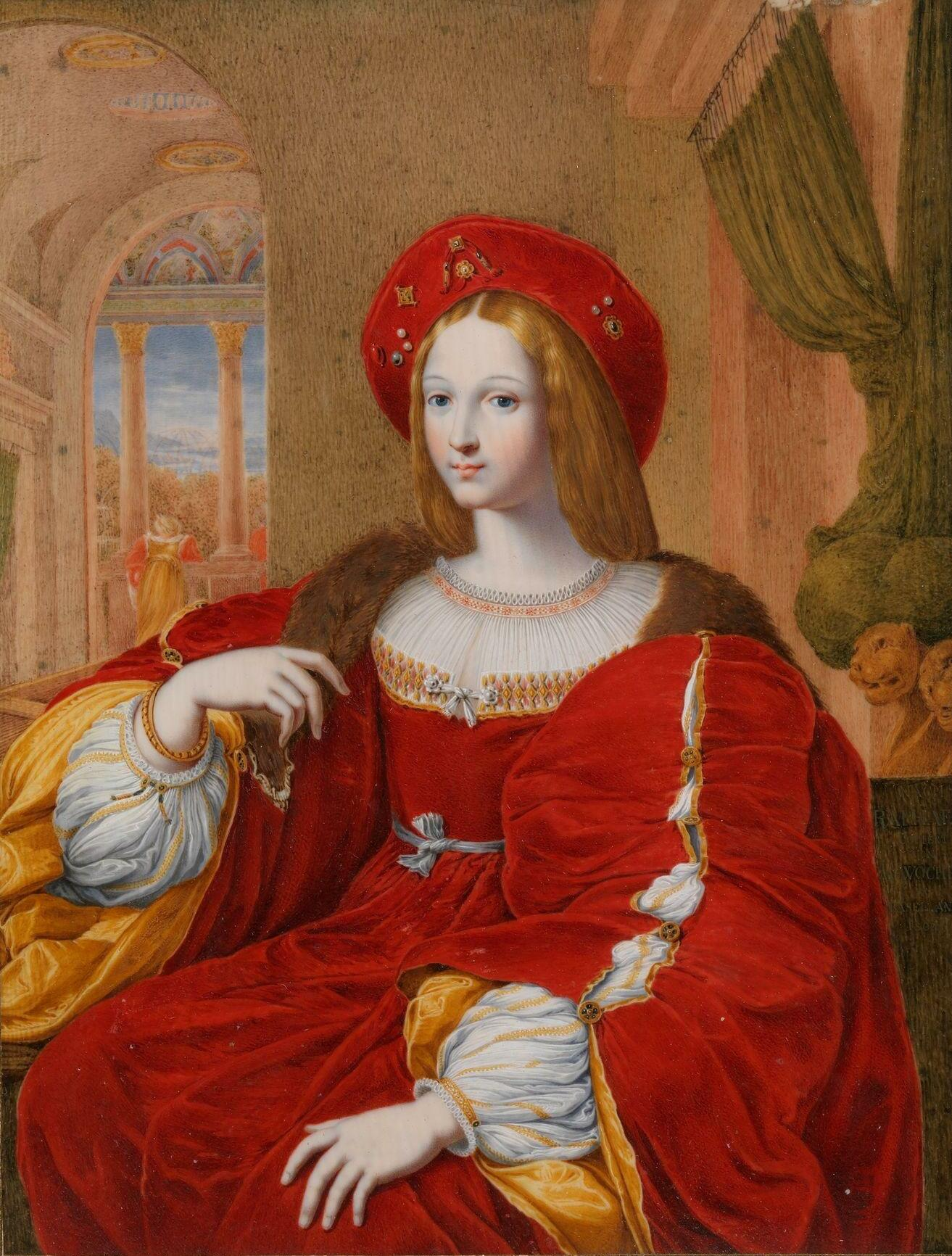
Portrait of Joanna after Raphael by Marquard Wocher

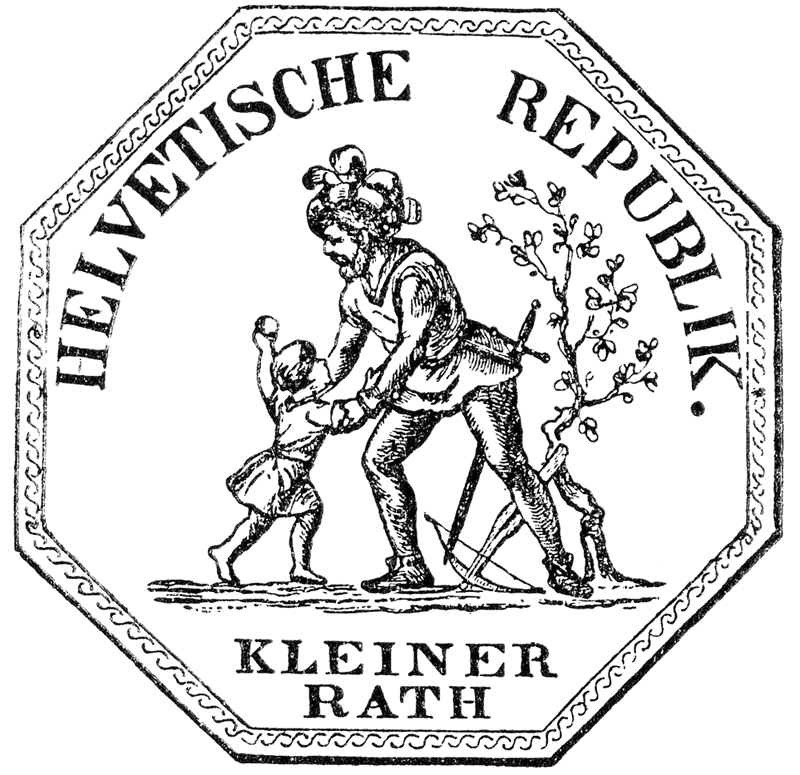
Seal of the Helvetic Republic

== Personal life ==
Marquard Wocher married Anna Büchel in 1800, who was the widow of the architect Johann Ulrich Büchel. He was also present at the Unspunnenfestival in 1808, which was organized by his student Franz Niklaus König.
