= Franz Niklaus König =

Swiss painter (1765–1832)

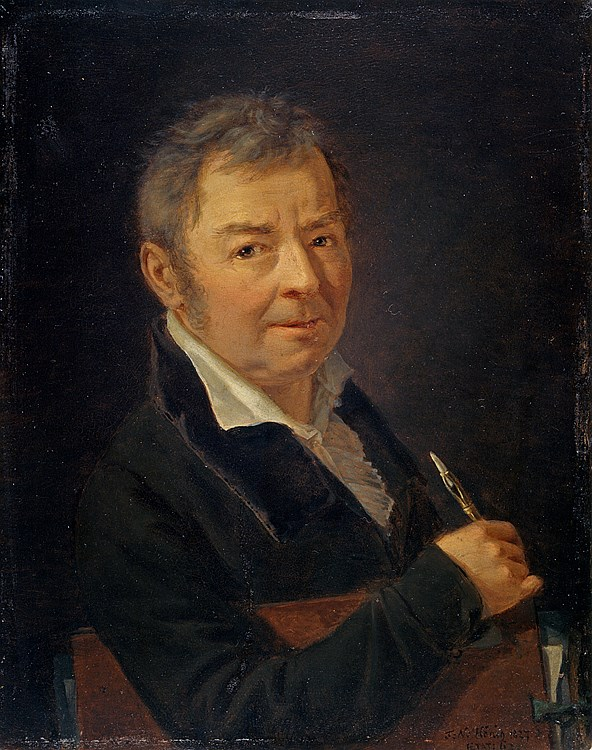
- Self-portrait, 1827
- Born: 6 April 1765; Bern, Switzerland
- Died: 27 March 1832 (aged 66); Bern, Switzerland
- Known for: Painting, printmaking

Franz Niklaus König (6 April 1765 – 27 March 1832) was a Swiss painter of portraits, genre scenes and landscapes. He also worked as a printmaker, producing etchings, copper engravings and lithographs. During his years in the Bernese Oberland, he made images of rural life and the region’s landscape. In his later career, he produced transparent paintings.

== Biography ==
Franz Niklaus König was born in Bern on 6 April 1765. He was the son of Emanuel König, a decorative painter.

König first worked in his father’s trade before studying in Bern with Marquard Wocher. From about 1782, he studied with Sigmund Freudenberger, and later received training in printmaking from Balthasar Anton Dunker. He married Maria Magdalena Wyss in 1786 and set up an independent decorative painting business in Bern.

In 1797, König and his family left Bern for the Bernese Oberland. Their residences there included Interlaken Castle and, from 1803 to 1809, Unterseen Castle. Much of his artistic activity took place during these years, although the period was disrupted by the French invasion of Switzerland and by his service as a captain of artillery. He served on the organising committee for the Unspunnen festivals in 1805 and 1808.

In 1809, König moved back to Bern because of financial difficulties and worked as a teacher. He died in Bern on 27 March 1832.

== Work ==
König painted portraits, genre scenes and landscapes. He also worked in watercolour, copper engraving, etching and lithography. His subjects included rural life and views of the Bernese Oberland.

During his years in the Bernese Oberland, König produced works aimed at visitors to the region, including coloured outline etchings, lithographs, watercolours and small oil paintings. His costume images and rural genre scenes were issued as popular print series. He also provided illustrations for publications including the Helvetischer Almanach and the Berner Neujahrsblätter.

In his later career, König turned to transparent paintings, including works with moonlit effects. After returning to Bern, he produced more than 100 of them. He presented these works to paying audiences by candlelight. In 1811, König began showing the Diaphanorama in Bern. In 1815, he opened a venue devoted to transparent paintings. He later showed these works on tours in Switzerland, Germany and Paris.

His works are held in collections including the Bern Historical Museum, the Swiss National Library, Kunstmuseum Bern, Kunsthaus Zürich and the Graphische Sammlung ETH Zürich.

== Gallery ==
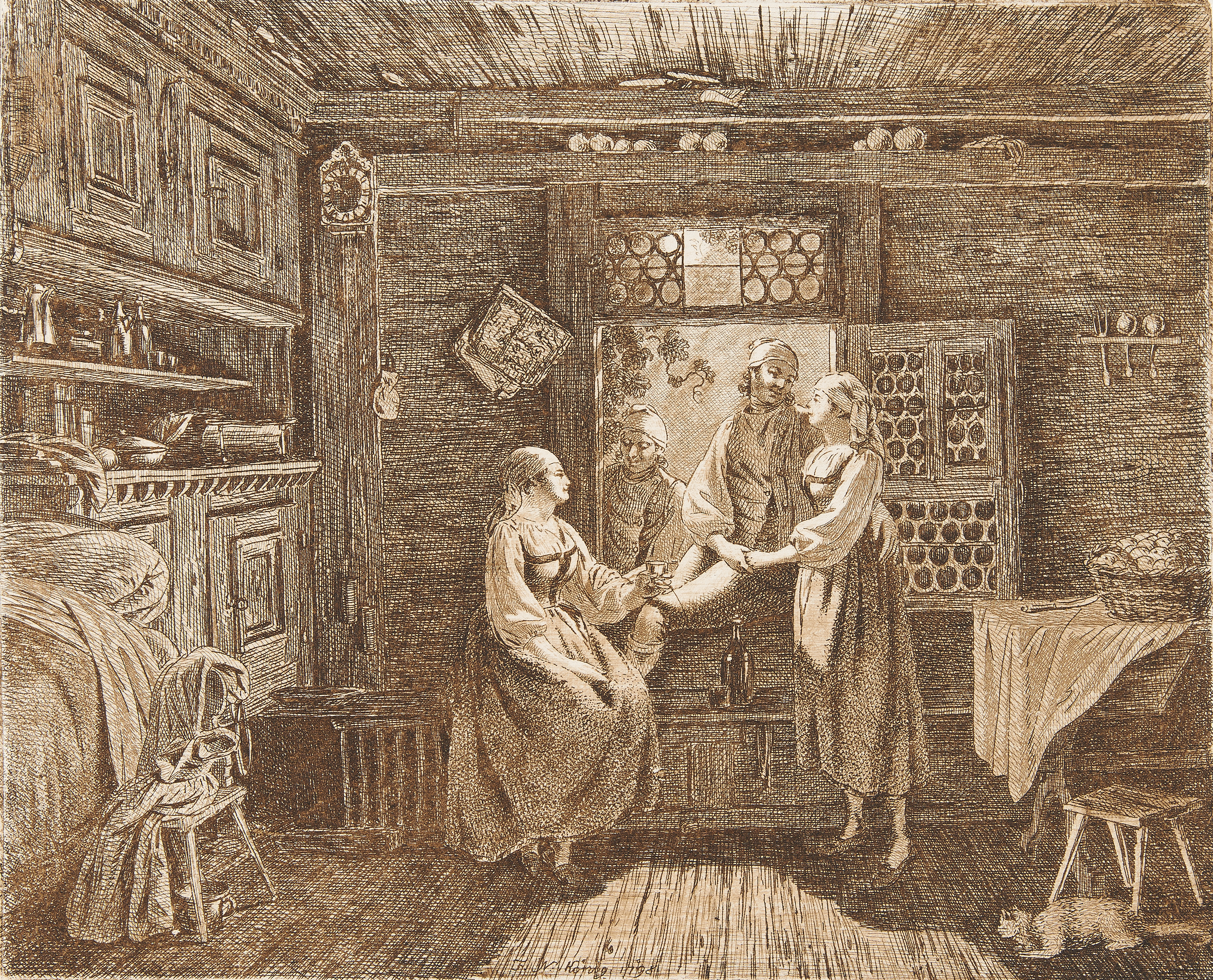
Kiltgang courtship custom, 1798

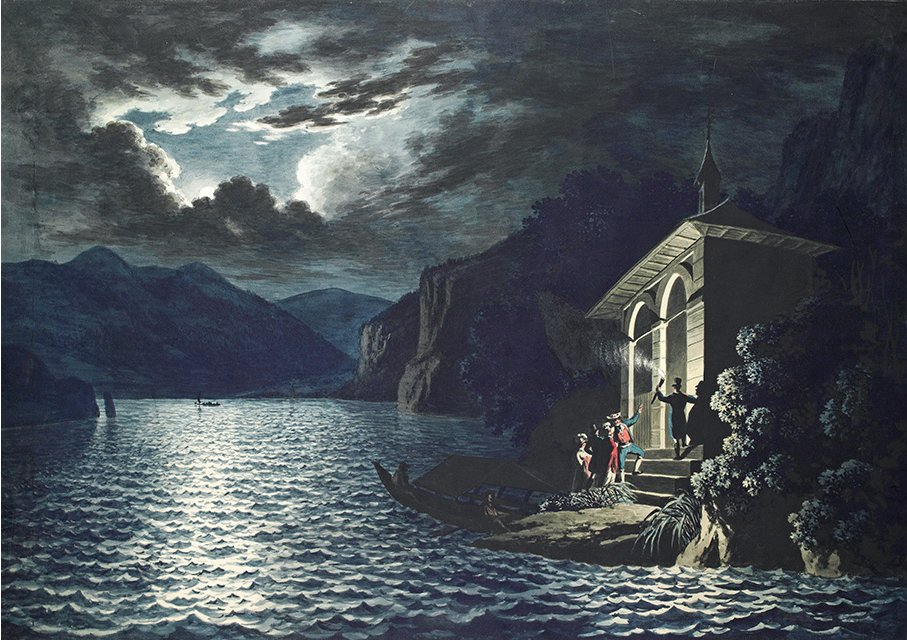
William Tell's Chapel on Lake Lucerne, c. 1810

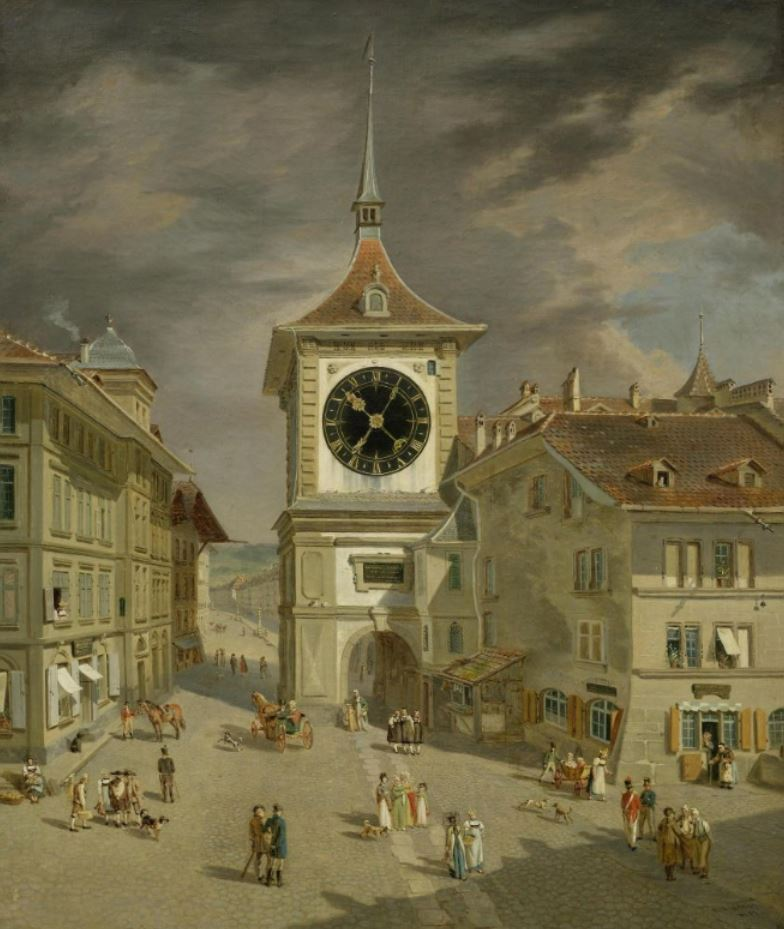
Zytglogge from the west, 1817
