= Patrick von Allmen =

Swiss luger

Patrick von Allmen (born 26 April 1985, in Thun) is a Swiss retired luger who competed on natural luge tracks in the Natural Track Luge World Cup from 2001 to 2005 and in two FIL World Luge Natural Track Championships.

== Career ==
He participated in international junior championships from 2000 to 2004. He usually finished in the middle of the pack, achieving his best result with 16th place at the 2004 Junior World Championships in Kindberg. Von Allmen participated twice in international championships in the senior category: After failing to finish the FIL World Luge Natural Track Championships 2001 in Stein an der Enns due to a DNF, he finished 32nd out of 47 competitors at the FIL World Luge Natural Track Championships 2005 in Latsch.

Von Allmen competed in the World Cup from 2001 to 2005. During these five years, he was the only male Swiss natural track luger to compete in the World Cup. He finished most of his World Cup races between 20th and 25th place, which generally corresponded to positions in the lower middle of the field. Besides a total of eight 22nd and 23rd place finishes, his best race result was 21st place in Hüttau at the end of his first World Cup season in 2000/2001. In the same winter, he also achieved his best overall World Cup ranking, finishing 22nd. In the 2003/2004 season, he again finished among the top 30 in the overall World Cup standings, placing 27th.

After 2005, von Allmen no longer participated in any international competitions, but still started in national races.
