= Schadau Castle =

Castle in Thun, Switzerland

Coordinates: 46.746111°N 7.637222°E

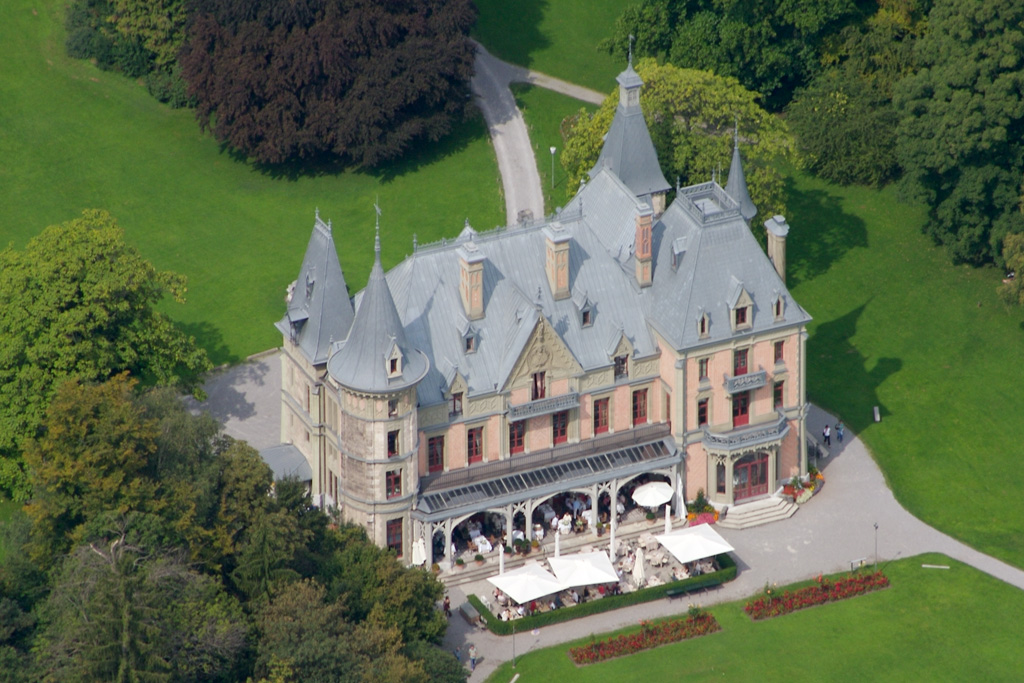
Schloss Schadau from the sky

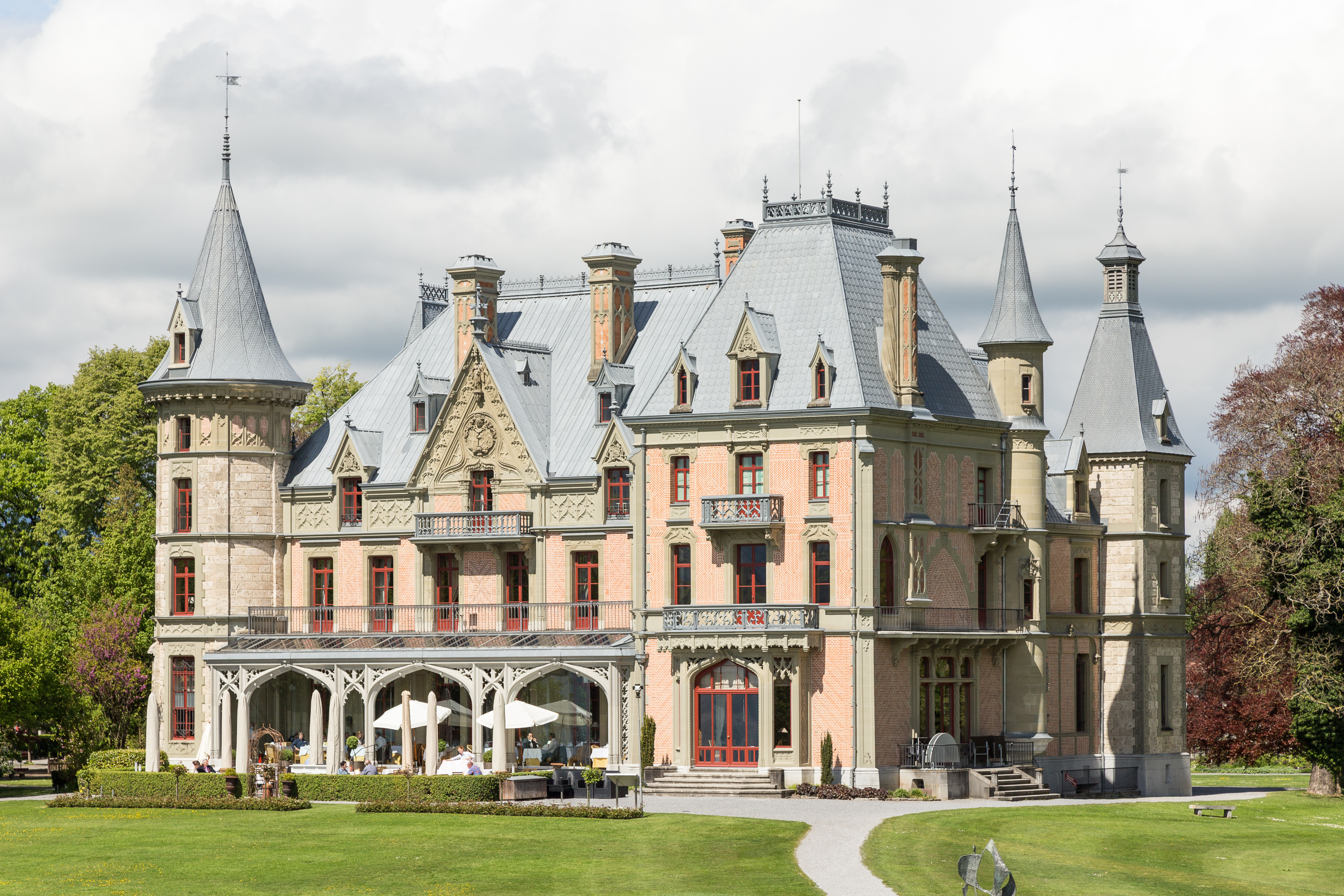
Schadau Castle in Thun

Schadau Castle (German: Schloss Schadau) is a castle on the south side of the Aare near Lake Thun in the city of Thun, Canton Bern, Switzerland. It is a Swiss heritage site of national significance.

== History ==
It is situated in the Schadaupark, and was built between 1846 and 1854 according to the plans of Pierre-Charles Dusillon in the Gothic Revival style, for the banker Abraham Denis Alfred de Rougemont

Since 1925 the castle has belonged to the city of Thun and contains a restaurant and the Swiss Gastronomy Museum. Between 1972 and 1992 the façade of the castle was renovated by the city's own quarrymen.

The oldest known surviving panorama was completed in 1814 by Marquard Wocher, and is on display at the Schadau Castle, depicting an average morning in the Swiss town of Thun. As of today it's owned by the Gottfried Keller Foundation.

== See also ==
- List of castles in Switzerland
