= Thun =

Town and municipality in Bern, Switzerland

- Municipality
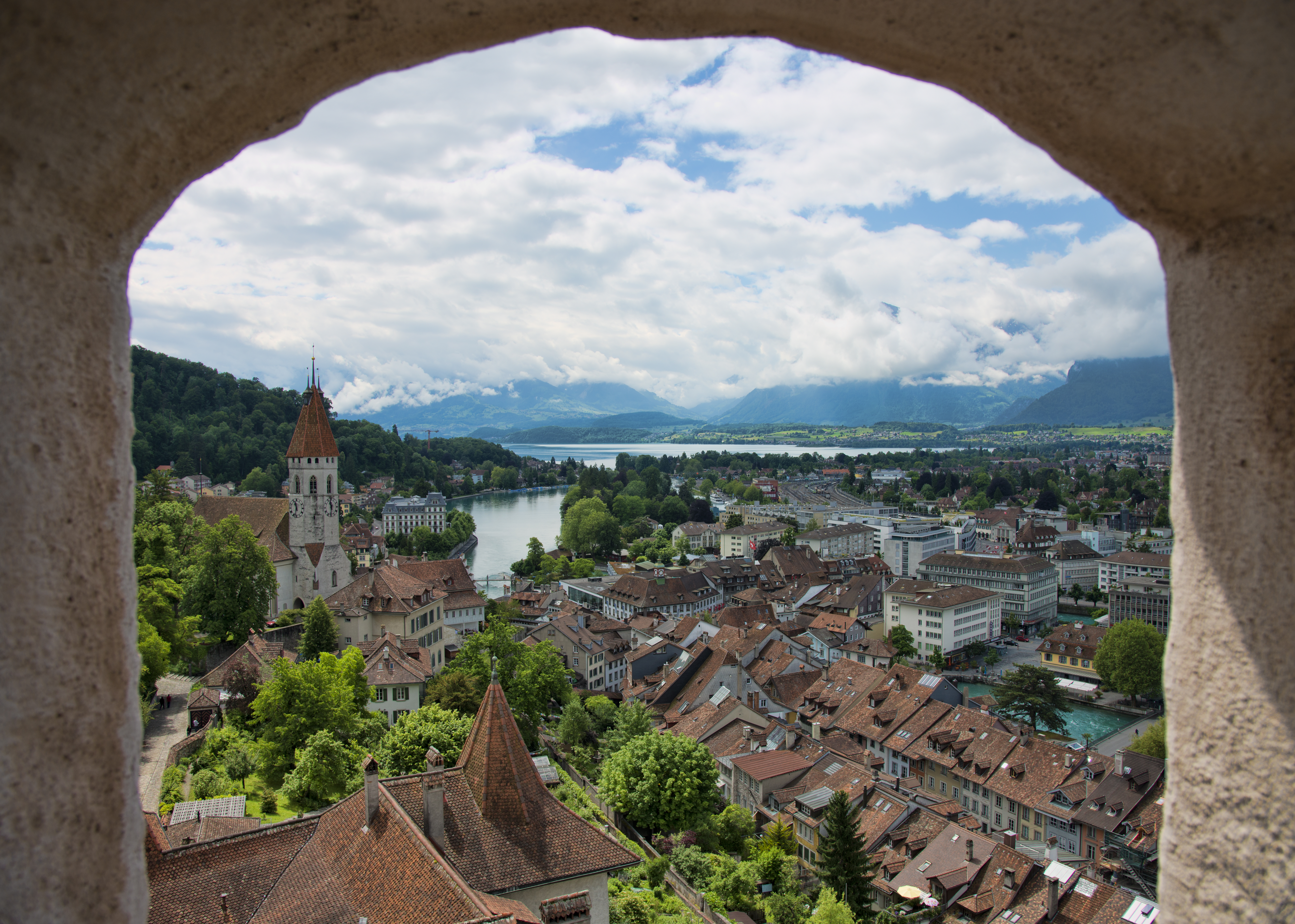
- Thun in 2012

- Flag Coat of arms
- Location of Thun
- Location within Switzerland Location within Canton of Bern
- Coordinates: 46°46′N 7°38′E
- Country: Switzerland
- Canton: Bern
- District: Thun

Government
  - Executive: Gemeinderat with 5 members
  - Mayor: Stadtpräsident (list); Raphael Lanz SVP/UDC (as of February 2014)
  - Parliament: Stadtrat with 40 members

Area
  - Total: 21.57 km^{2} (8.33 sq mi)
- Elevation (Railway station): 560 m (1,840 ft)
- Highest elevation (Dürrenbergwald): 1,172 m (3,845 ft)
- Lowest elevation (Aare at Lerchenfeld): 552 m (1,811 ft)

Population (Dec 2024)
  - Total: 44,125
  - Density: 2,046/km^{2} (5,298/sq mi)
- Demonym: German: Thuner(in)
- Time zone: UTC+01:00 (CET)
  - Summer (DST): UTC+02:00 (CEST)
- Postal code: 3600-3645
- SFOS number: 942
- ISO 3166 code: CH-BE
- Surrounded by: Amsoldingen, Heiligenschwendi, Heimberg, Hilterfingen, Homberg, Schwendibach, Spiez, Steffisburg, Thierachern, Uetendorf, Zwieselberg
- Website: www.thun.ch

Thun (German pronunciation: [tuːn]; French: Thoune [tun]) is a town and a municipality in the administrative district of Thun in the canton of Bern in Switzerland. It is located where the Aare flows out of Lake Thun (Thunersee), 30 kilometres (19 miles) southeast of Bern.

As of December 2018, the municipality has about 45,000 inhabitants and around 80,000 live in the agglomeration.

Besides tourism, machine and precision instrument engineering, the largest garrison in the country, the food industry, armaments and publishing are of economic importance to Thun.

== History ==
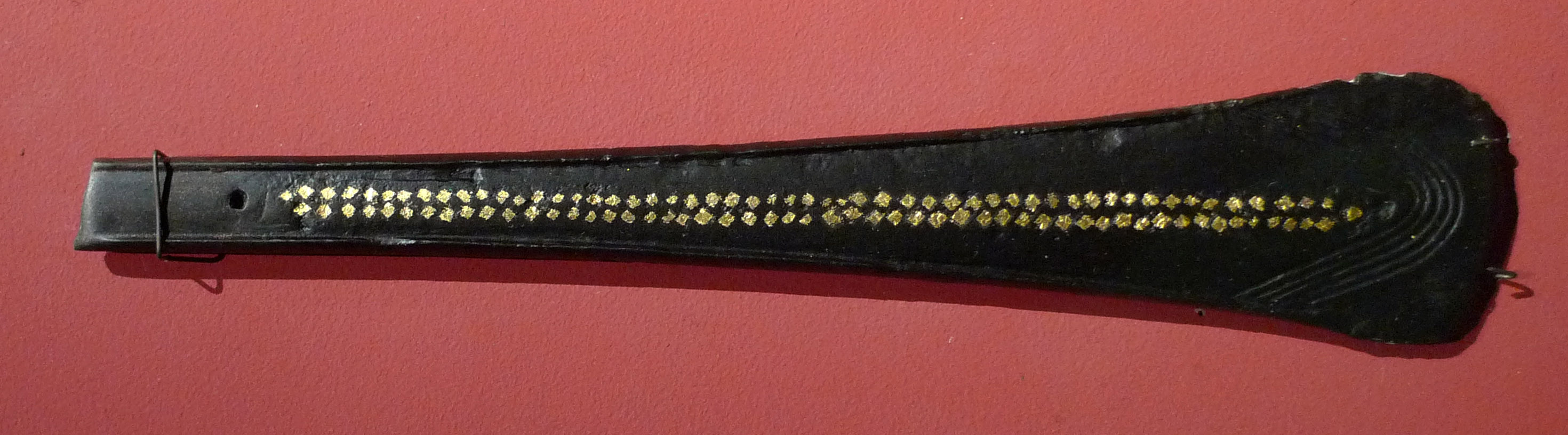
Thun-Renzenbühl axe, 1800 BC

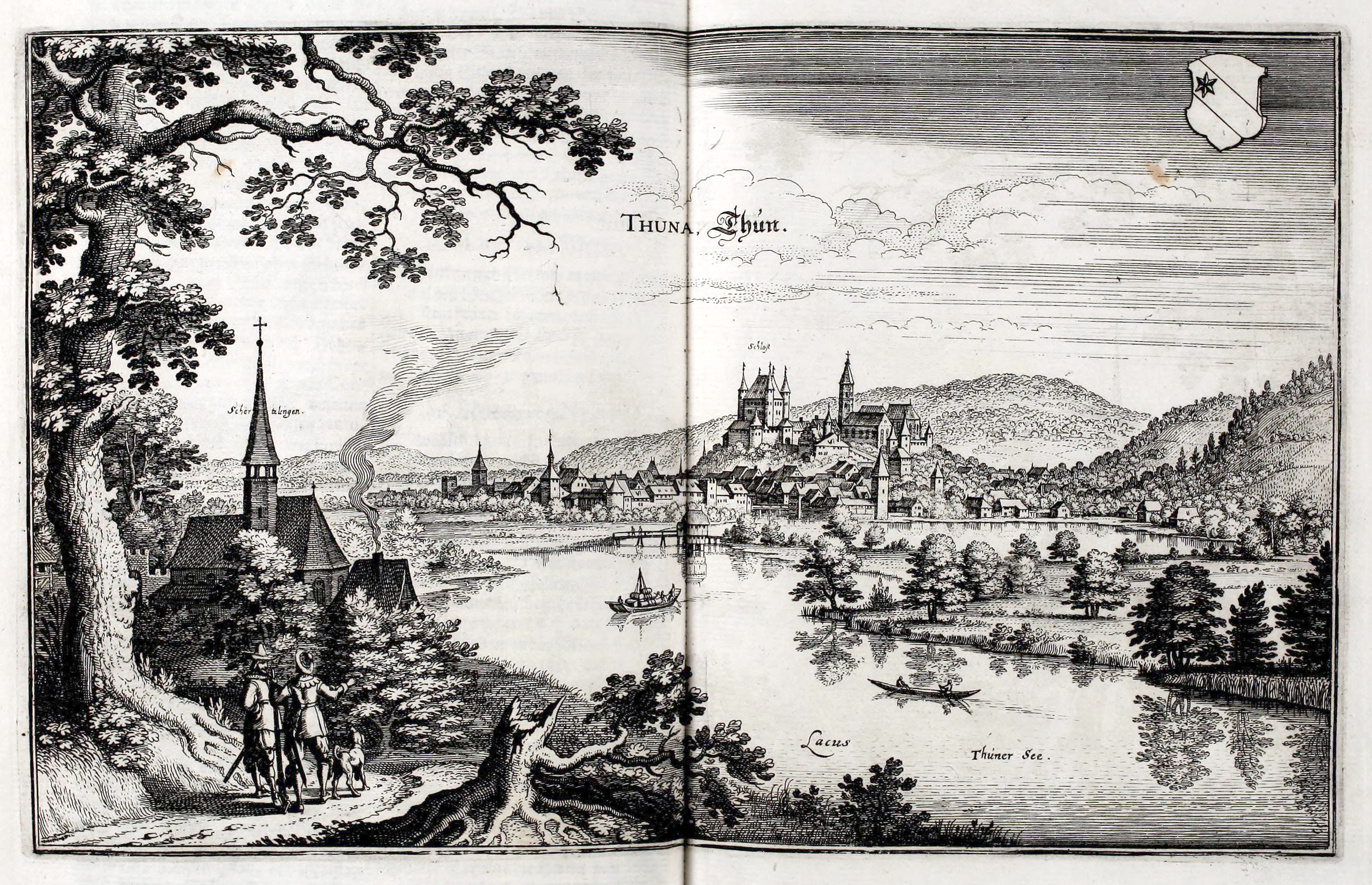
Thun in the "Topographia Helvetiæ, Rhætiæ et Valesiæ" by Matthäus Merian the Elder, 1654

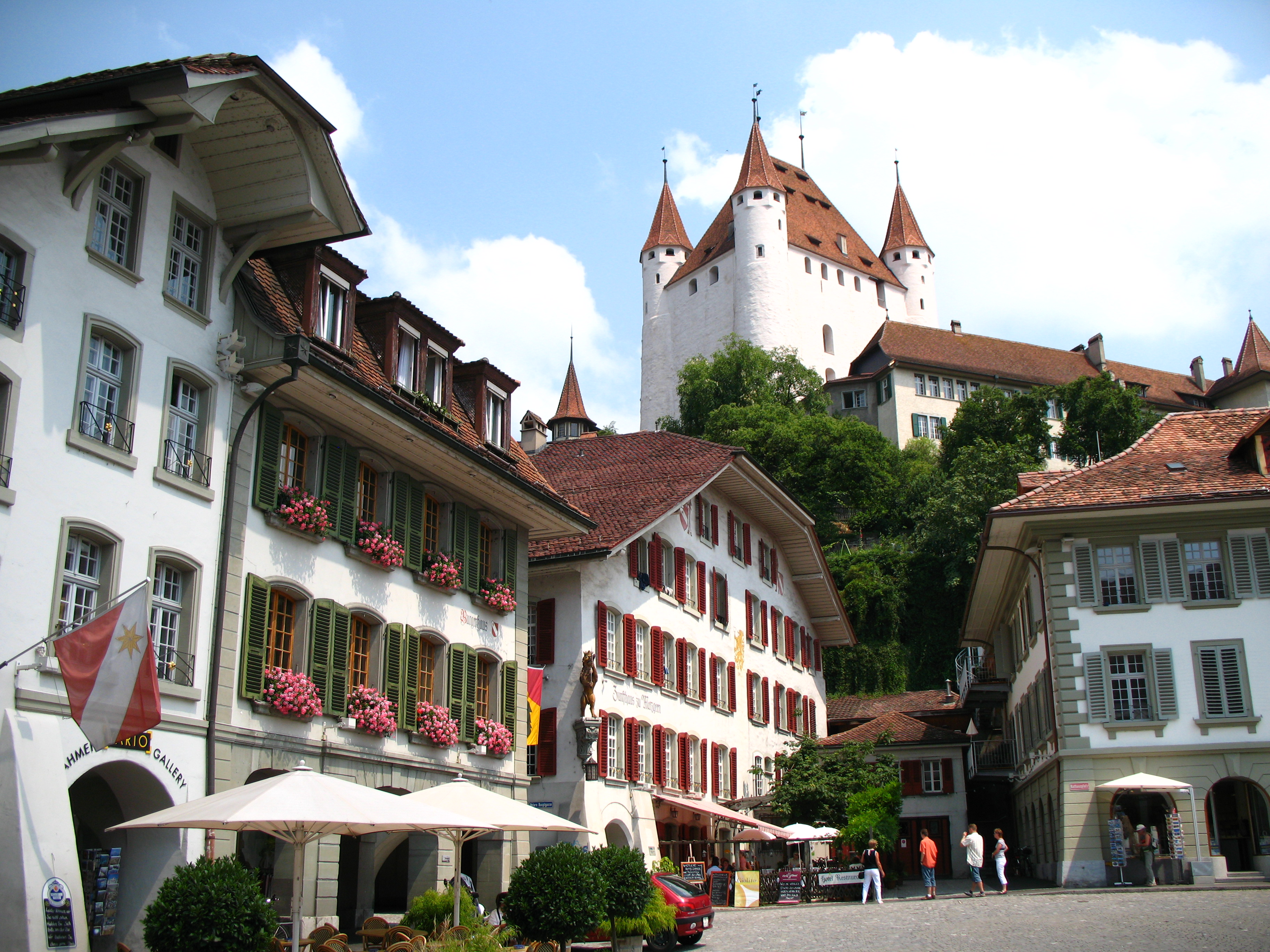
Castle Thun over City Hall Square

The area of what is now Thun was inhabited since the Neolithic age (mid-3rd millennium BC). During the early Bronze Age there were a number of settlements along the lake shore and the Aare. A site at Renzenbühl had a local chief or nobleman's grave which contained one of the richest collections of early Bronze Age artifacts in Europe. The Thun-Renzenbühl axe, dating from 1800 BC, is one of the earliest examples of damascening technique in the world. The gold inlay decoration on the axe may also have a numerical, astronomical meaning. Another site at Wiler contained approximately 1,500 maritime snail shells which were harvested from the Mediterranean and traded over the Alps.

The name of the town derives from the Celtic term Dunum, meaning "fortified town". It fell to Rome in 58 BC, when Roman legions conquered almost all of Switzerland, and it soon became one of the main centers of Roman administration in the region.

The Romans were driven out of Thun, and out of the rest of Switzerland, by the Burgundians around 400 AD. The Aare became the frontier between the Christian Burgundians and the Pagan, German-speaking Alemanni, who lived north. The region was mentioned for the first time during the 7th century, in the chronicle of Frankish monk Fredgar. The town is first mentioned in 1133 as Tuno.

The region of Thun became a part of the Holy Roman Empire in 1033, when Conrad II gained the title of King of Burgundy. The emperors entrusted the Zähringen family, centred in Bern, with subduing the unruly nobles of central Switzerland. Around 1190, Duke Bertold V of Zähringen, built Thun castle and expanded the town. After Bertold's death in 1218, his territories went to Ulrich III von Kyburg.

In 1264, Thun received town rights and in 1384, the town was bought by the canton of Bern. Thun was the capital of the Canton of Oberland of the Helvetic Republic, which lasted from 1798 until 1803.

In 1819, a Military School was founded in the town, which later developed into the main military school in Switzerland. Thun was connected to the railway network of Switzerland in 1859 and telephone access made available in 1888.

== Geography and climate ==
=== Topography ===
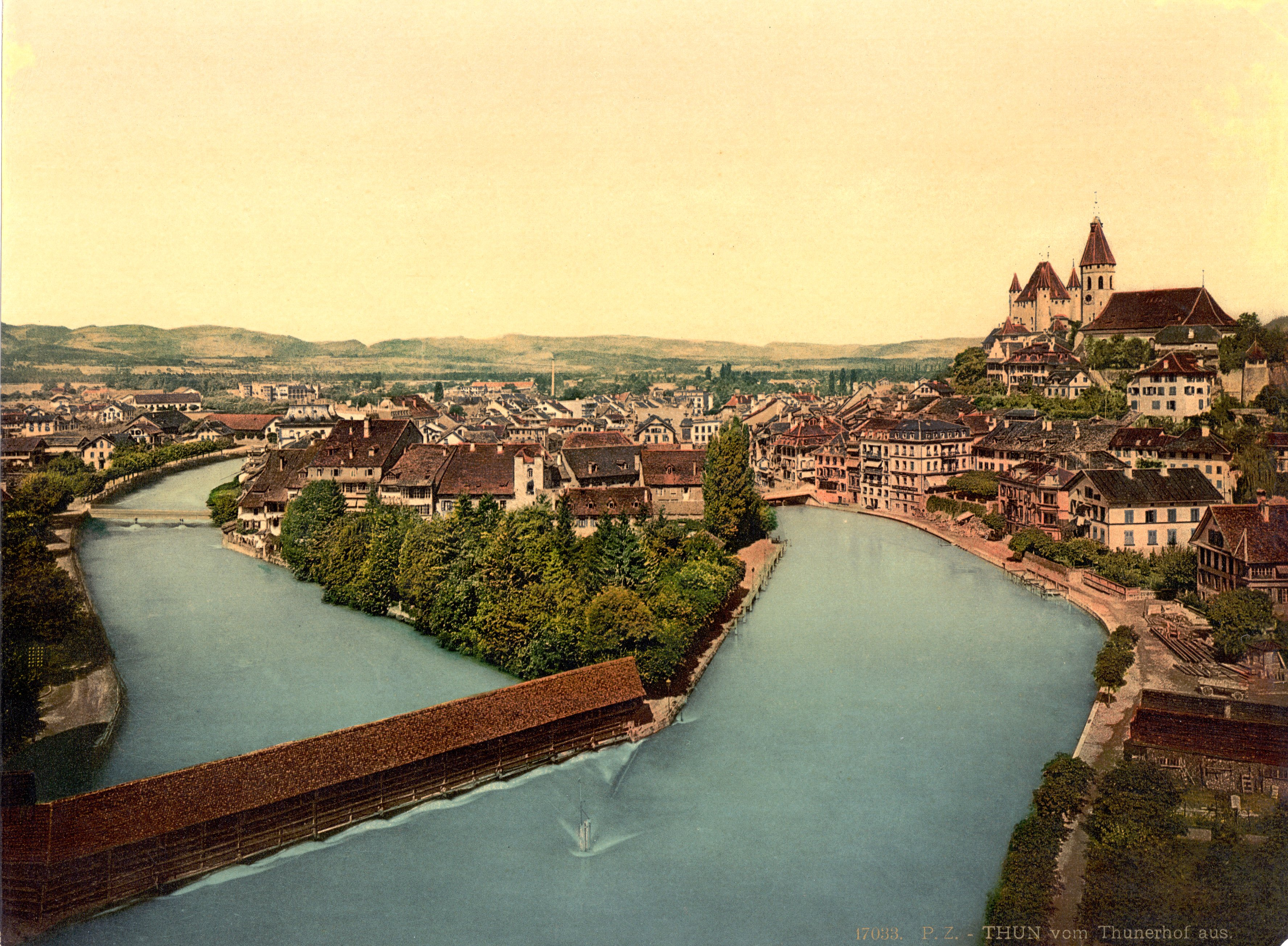
Photochrome of the Aare and Thun Castle from 1900

The center of Thun is on the Aare, just downstream of the point where it flows out of Lake Thun, and encompasses both banks of the river and an island between. The town covers an area of 21.6 km^{2} (8.3 sq mi), with the town boundaries reaching up to 4 km (2.5 mi) from the town centre. The town ranges in altitude between about 560 m (1,840 ft), in the town center, and 1,170 m (3,840 ft), on its eastern boundary.

Thun has an area of 21.57 km^{2} (8.33 sq mi). As of the 2004 survey, 6.03 km^{2} (2.33 mi^{2}) or 27.9% is used for agricultural purposes, while 4.32 km^{2} (1.67 mi^{2}) or 20.0% is forested. Of rest of the municipality, 10.76 km^{2} (4.15 mi^{2}) or 49.9% is settled (buildings or roads), 0.29 km^{2} (0.11 mi^{2}) or 1.3% is either rivers or lakes, and 0.19 km^{2} (0.073 mi^{2}) or 0.9% is unproductive land.

From the same survey, industrial buildings made up 5.7% of the area while housing and buildings made up 26.8% and transportation infrastructure 12.1%. Parks, green belts and sports fields made up 4.4%. All the forested land area is covered with heavy forests. Of the agricultural land, 11.4% is used for growing crops and 15.6% is pasturage. Of the water in the municipality, 0.9% is in lakes and 0.4% is in rivers and streams.

On 31 December 2009 Amtsbezirk Thun, of which it was the capital, was dissolved. On 1 January 2010, it became the capital of the larger Verwaltungskreis Thun.

Aerial view by Walter Mittelholzer (1919)

=== Climate ===
Between 1981 and 2010 Thun had an average of 123.7 days of rain or snow per year and on average received 1,024 mm (40.3 in) of precipitation. The wettest month was August, during which Thun received an average of 138 mm (5.4 in) of rain or snow and there was precipitation for an average of 11.7 days. The month with the most days of precipitation was June, with an average of 12.9, but with only 132 mm (5.2 in) of rain or snow. The driest month was February with an average of 46 mm (1.8 in) of precipitation over 8.3 days.

== Politics ==
=== Coat of arms ===
The blazon of the municipal coat of arms is Gules on a Bend Argent in chief a Mullet of Seven Or.

=== Elections ===
==== National Council ====
In the 2023 Swiss federal election for the Swiss National Council, the most popular party was the SVP which received 26.14% (-0.49%) of the vote. Followed by the SP at 21% (+4.1%), the GLP at 12.69% (+1.84%), and the Green Party of Switzerland at 11.32% (-3.74%). Voter participation 45.2%, up by 2.4% from the previous election.

In the 2019 federal election the most popular party was the SVP which received 26.6% (-4.2) of the vote. The next six most popular parties were the SP (16.9%, -2.1), the Green Party (15.1%, +5.6), the glp (10.9%, +4.0), FDP (7.6%, -1.0), the BDP (7.0%, -4.1), and the EVP (5.9%, +0.1). In the federal election a total of 13,904 votes were cast, and the voter turnout was 42.8%.

In the 2011 federal election the most popular party was the Swiss People's Party (SVP) which received 25.5% of the vote. The next three most popular parties were the Social Democratic Party (SP) (19.6%), the Conservative Democratic Party (BDP) (16.1%) and the Green Party (8.9%). In the federal election, a total of 15,012 votes were cast, and the voter turnout was 46.8%.

=== International relations ===
==== Twin & sister towns ====
From 1996 to 2019 Thun was twinned with Gabrovo in Bulgaria.

==== Zähringer towns ====
For 30 years, authorities, associations and other population groups have been visiting the Zähringer towns. In Germany, this friendly alliance includes: Freiburg im Breisgau, Villingen-Schwenningen, Neuenburg am Rhein, Bräunlingen, St. Peter in the Black Forest and Weilheim an der Teck, and in Switzerland: Bern, Freiburg, Burgdorf, Murten and Rheinfelden.

== Demographics ==
=== Population ===
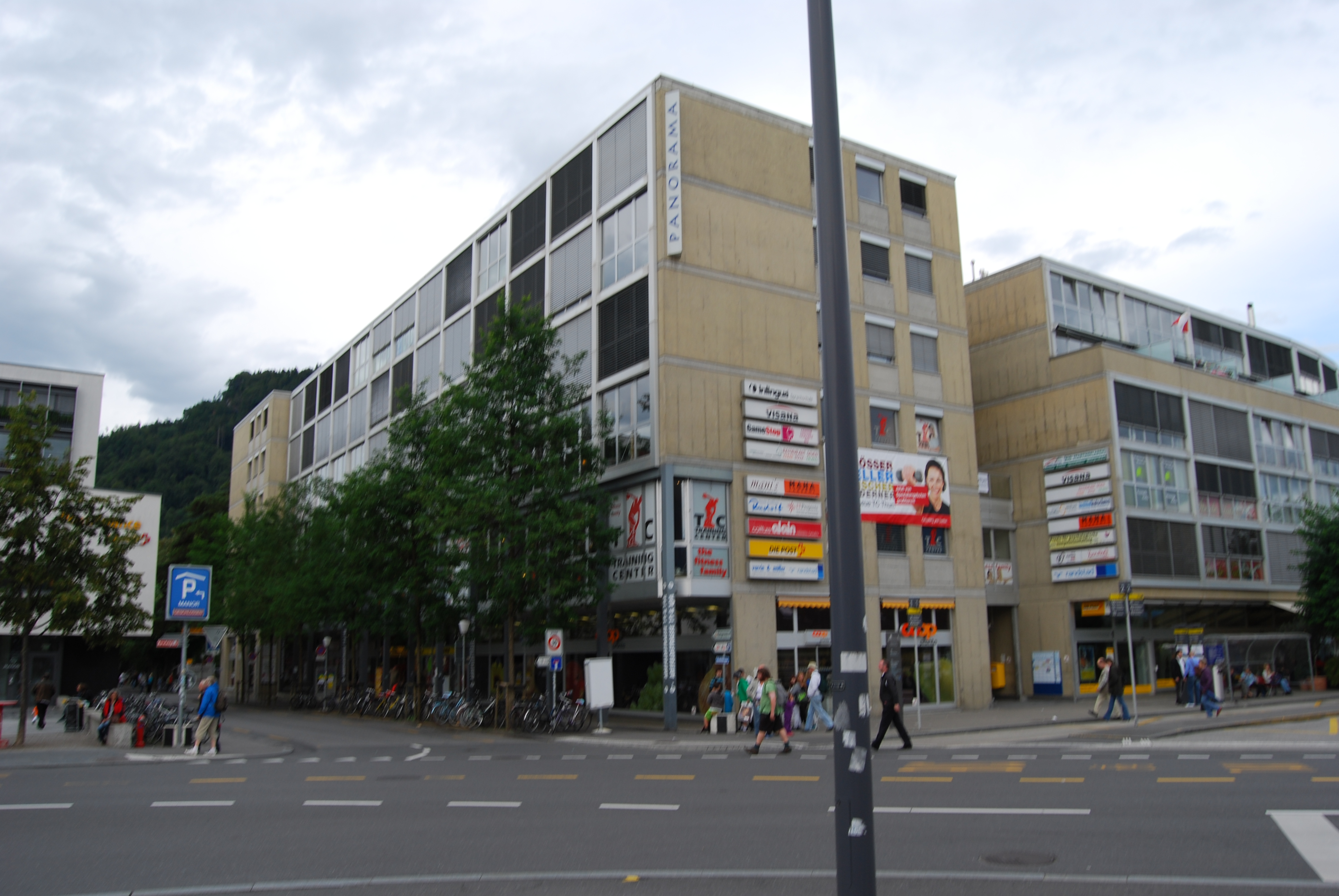
Low rise apartments in Thun

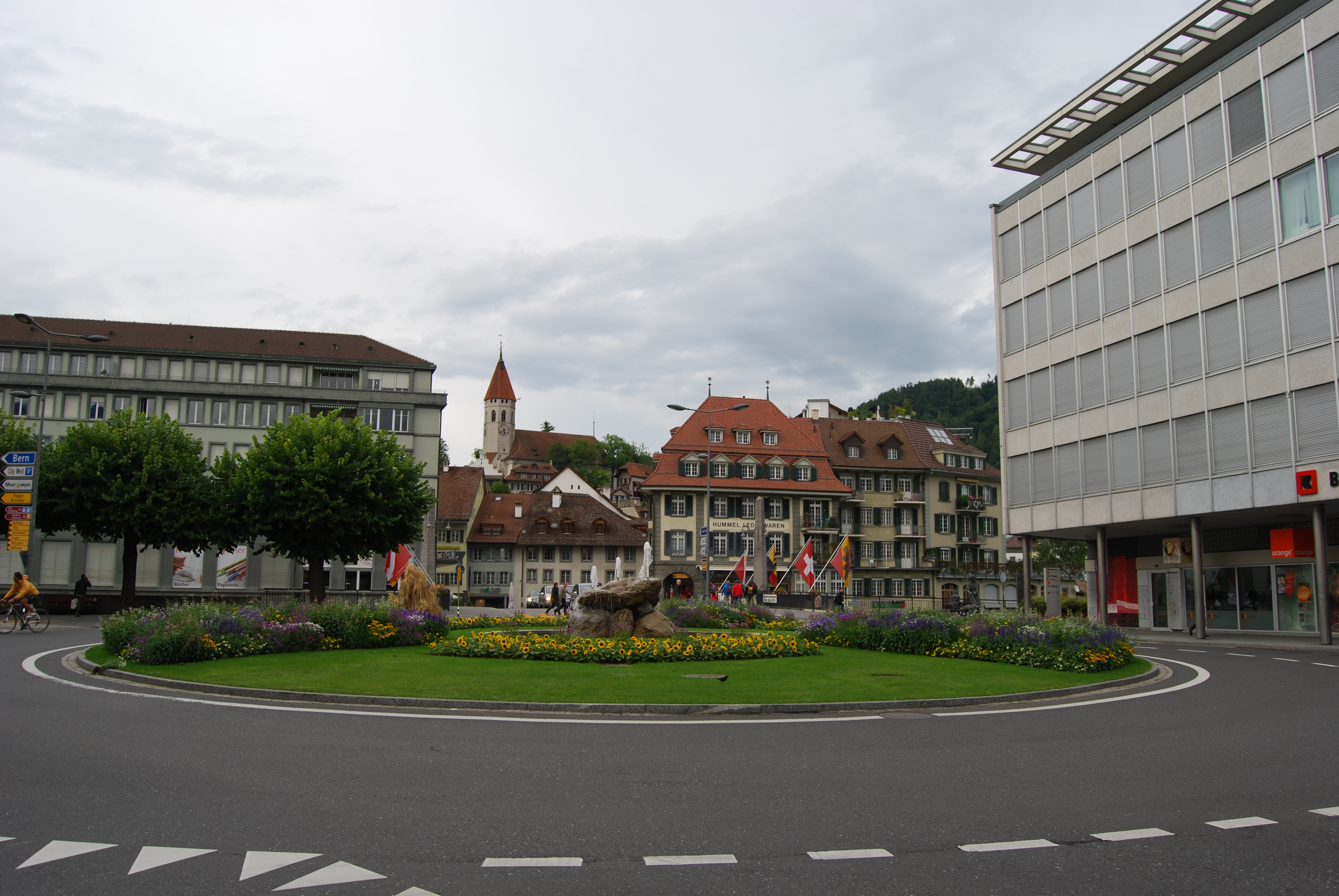
Historic and modern buildings in Thun

Thun has a population (as of December 2020) of 43,476. As of 2012, 12.3% of the population are resident foreign nationals. Between the last 2 years (2010–2012) the population changed at a rate of 0.3%. Migration accounted for 0.4%, while births and deaths accounted for -0.4%.

Most of the population (as of 2000) speaks German (36,551 or 90.5%) as their first language, Italian is the second most common (728 or 1.8%) and Albanian is the third (511 or 1.3%). There are 399 people who speak French and 31 people who speak Romansh.

As of 2013, the population was 47.5% male and 52.5% female. The population was made up of 17,629 Swiss men (41.1% of the population) and 2,779 (6.5%) non-Swiss men. There were 19,956 Swiss women (46.5%) and 2,559 (6.0%) non-Swiss women. Of the population in the municipality, 12,265 or about 30.4% were born in Thun and lived there in 2000. There were 15,105 or 37.4% who were born in the same canton, while 5,846 or 14.5% were born somewhere else in Switzerland, and 5,699 or 14.1% were born outside of Switzerland.

As of 2012, children and teenagers (0–19 years old) make up 17.5% of the population, while adults (20–64 years old) make up 60.7% and seniors (over 64 years old) make up 21.8%.

As of 2000, there were 15,905 people who were single and never married in the municipality. There were 18,969 married individuals, 2,875 widows or widowers and 2,628 individuals who are divorced.

As of 2010, there were 7,537 households that consist of only one person and 919 households with five or more people. In 2000, a total of 18,153 apartments (92.4% of the total) were permanently occupied, while 1,080 apartments (5.5%) were seasonally occupied and 406 apartments (2.1%) were empty. As of 2012, the construction rate of new housing units was 5.5 new units per 1000 residents.

As of 2003 the average price to rent an average apartment in Thun was 1017.63 Swiss francs (CHF) per month (US$810, £460, €650 approx. exchange rate from 2003). The average rate for a one-room apartment was 601.00 CHF (US$480, £270, €380), a two-room apartment was about 784.97 CHF (US$630, £350, €500), a three-room apartment was about 927.87 CHF (US$740, £420, €590) and a six or more room apartment cost an average of 1821.24 CHF (US$1460, £820, €1170). The average apartment price in Thun was 91.2% of the national average of 1116 CHF.

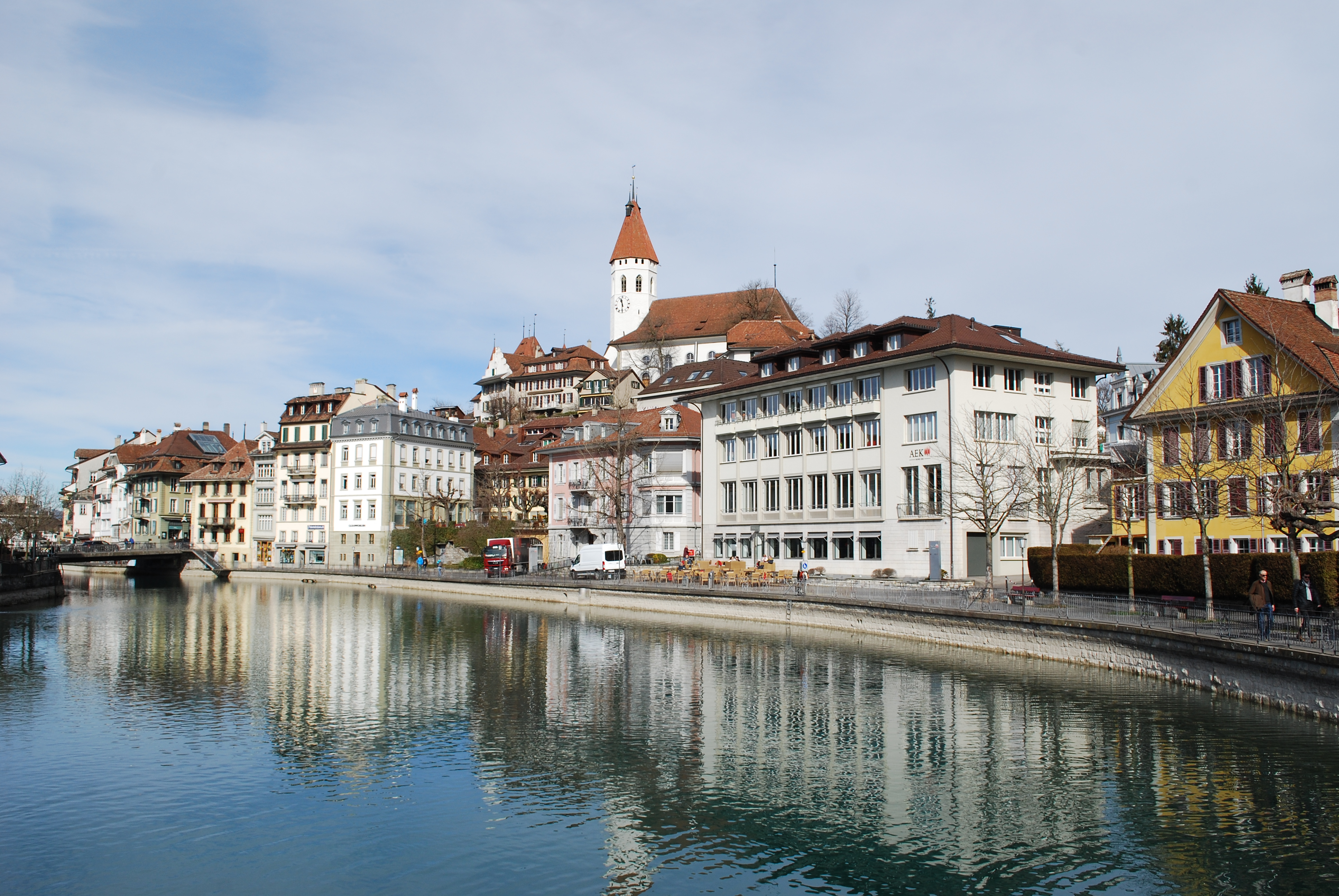
Historic Thun

The vacancy rate for the municipality, in 2013, was 0.1%. In 2012, single family homes made up 46.7% of the total housing in the municipality.

==== Historic population ====
The historical population is given in the following chart:

Historic Population Data
Year	Total Population	German Speaking	Italian Speaking	Protestant	Catholic	Other	Jewish	Muslim	No religion given	Swiss	Non-Swiss
Beginning 15th century	ca. 1400										
1764	1,414										
1798	1,566										
1818	1,936										
1836	2,646										
1850	6,019			5,897	121	1				5,866	153
1870	7,290			7,076	236	6				7,034	284
1888	8,286	8,154	13	8,038	233	15	4			8,007	279
1900	10,213	9,951	55	9,762	417	34	26			9,904	309
1910	12,173	11,805	107	11,540	537	96	27			11,693	480
1930	16,524	15,979	114	15,372	968	184	35			16,060	464
1950	24,157	23,105	273	21,774	2,150	233	34			23,667	490
1970	36,523	33,566	1,663	30,825	5,325	373	22	16	178	33,662	2,861
1990	38,211	34,944	895	29,426	5,314	3,471	22	307	1,093	34,932	3,279
2000	40,377	36,551	728	28,120	5,852	6,405	17	1,365	2,765	35,315	5,062

=== Religion ===
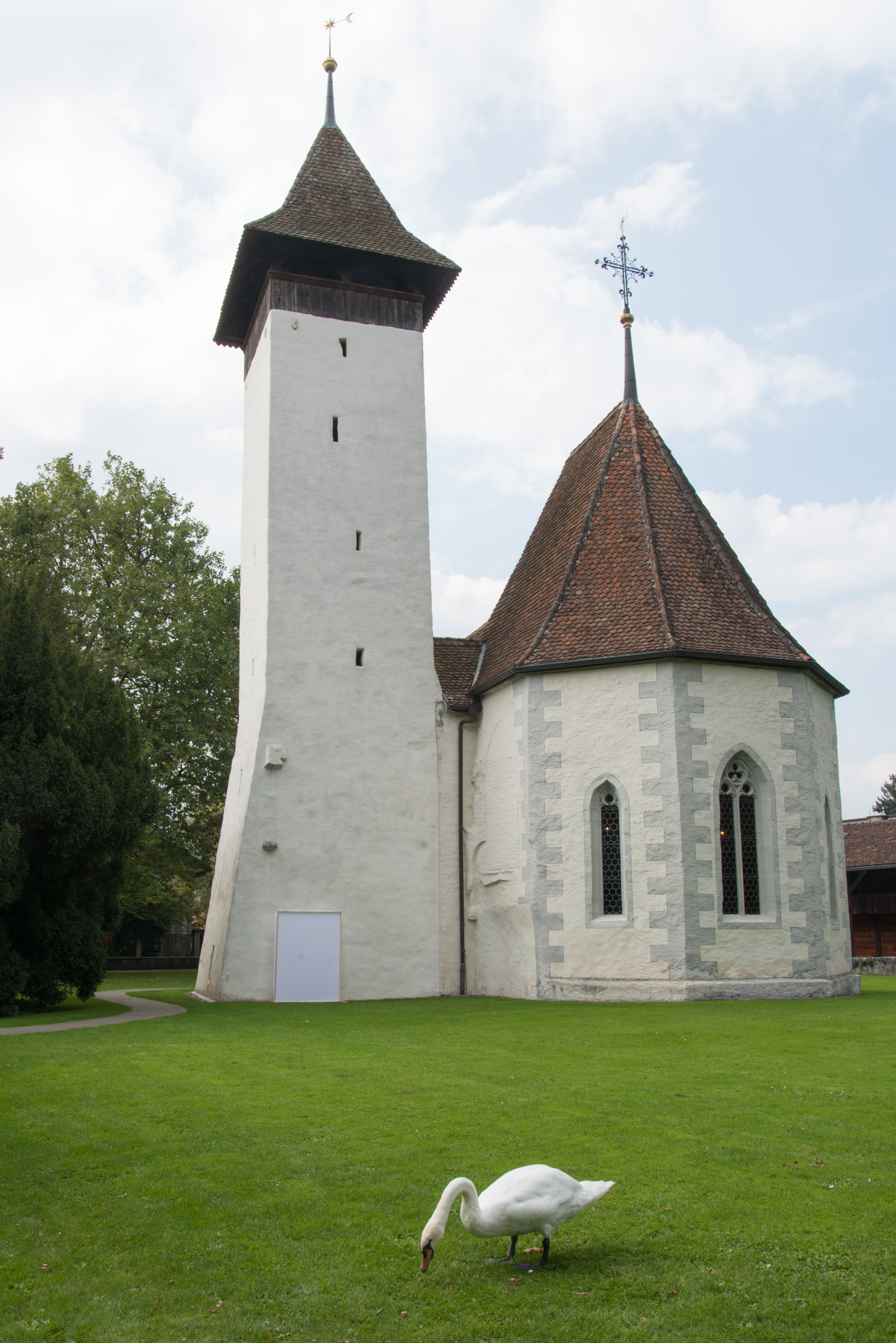
The historic Scherzligen Church in Thun

From the 2000 census, 26,334 or 65.2% belonged to the Swiss Reformed Church, while 5,852 or 14.5% were Roman Catholic. Of the rest of the population, there were 441 members of an Orthodox church (or about 1.09% of the population), there were 37 individuals (or about 0.09% of the population) who belonged to the Christian Catholic Church, and there were 1,823 individuals (or about 4.51% of the population) who belonged to another Christian church. There were 17 individuals (or about 0.04% of the population) who were Jewish, and 1,365 (or about 3.38% of the population) who were Muslim. There were 115 individuals who were Buddhist, 347 individuals who were Hindu and 35 individuals who belonged to another church. 2,765 (or about 6.85% of the population) belonged to no church, are agnostic or atheist, and 1,246 individuals (or about 3.09% of the population) did not answer the question.

=== Economy ===
As of 2011, Thun had an unemployment rate of 2.41%. As of 2011, there were a total of 28,536 people employed in the municipality. Of these, there were 114 people employed in the primary economic sector and about 44 businesses involved in this sector. The secondary sector employs 6,625 people and there were 450 businesses in this sector. The tertiary sector employs 21,797 people, with 2,696 businesses in this sector. There were 20,515 residents of the municipality who were employed in some capacity, of which females made up 44.5% of the workforce.

In 2008 there were a total of 20,331 full-time equivalent jobs. The number of jobs in the primary sector was 66, of which 63 were in agriculture, 1 was in forestry or lumber production and 1 was in fishing or fisheries. The number of jobs in the secondary sector was 6,159 of which 3,898 or (63.3%) were in manufacturing and 2,092 (34.0%) were in construction. The number of jobs in the tertiary sector was 14,106. In the tertiary sector; 2,910 or 20.6% were in wholesale or retail sales or the repair of motor vehicles, 918 or 6.5% were in the movement and storage of goods, 968 or 6.9% were in a hotel or restaurant, 345 or 2.4% were in the information industry, 663 or 4.7% were the insurance or financial industry, 1,075 or 7.6% were technical professionals or scientists, 692 or 4.9% were in education and 2,457 or 17.4% were in health care.

In 2000, there were 12,673 workers who commuted into the municipality and 9,195 workers who commuted away. The municipality is a net importer of workers, with about 1.4 workers entering the municipality for every one leaving. A total of 11,320 workers (47.2% of the 23,993 total workers in the municipality) both lived and worked in Thun. Of the working population, 27% used public transportation to get to work, and 41.2% used a private car.

The local and cantonal tax rate in Thun is one of the lowest in the canton. In 2012 the average local and cantonal tax rate on a married resident, with two children, of Thun making 150,000 CHF was 12.1%, while an unmarried resident's rate was 18.1%. For comparison, the average rate for the entire canton in 2011, was 14.2% and 22.0%, while the nationwide average was 12.3% and 21.1% respectively.

In 2010 there were a total of 20,367 tax payers in the municipality. Of that total, 6,140 made over 75,000 CHF per year. There were 133 people who made between 15,000 and 20,000 per year. The greatest number of workers, 6,238, made between 50,000 and 75,000 CHF per year. The average income of the over 75,000 CHF group in Thun was 113,507 CHF, while the average across all of Switzerland was 131,244 CHF.

In 2011 a total of 2.4% of the population received direct financial assistance from the government.

== Public transport ==
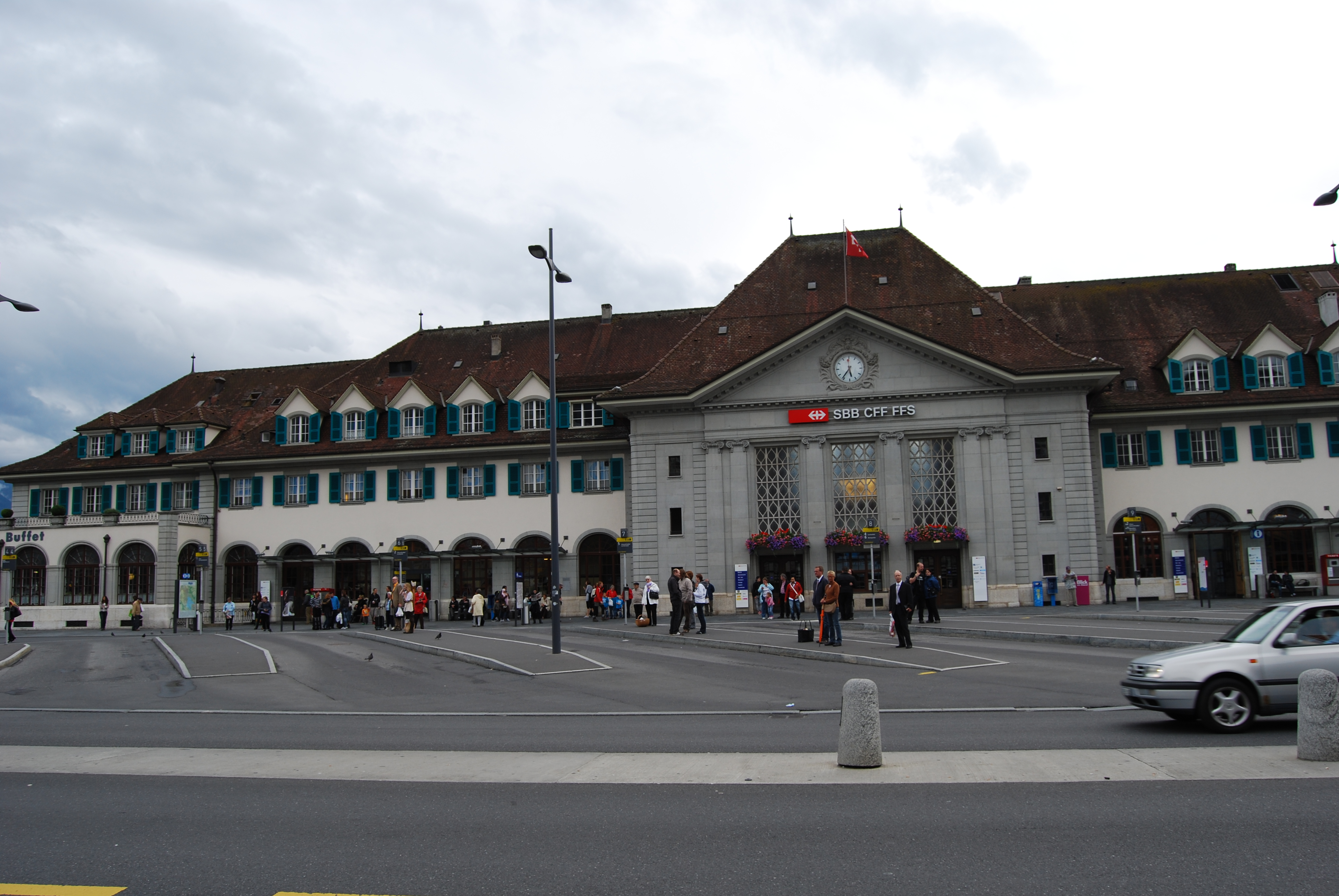
Thun railway station

Thun's main node for public transport is Thun railway station. Here public transport bus service, both within the urban area and connecting Thun with nearby towns, is provided by Verkehrsbetriebe STI. Intercity passenger rail service is provided by BLS AG and by Swiss Federal Railways (SBB CFF FFS). BLS also operates passenger ships on Lake Thun, which reach the station by means of the Thun ship canal.

== Main sights ==
- Thun Castle (twelfth century) with a history museum. The museum spans seven floors and covers Thun’s history, the Thun Town Hall Collection, the medieval Knights’ Hall, the former prison, the Bernese hipped roof, and Thun majolica collections.
- The Rathaus (town hall), erected in the 16th century
- Lake Thun and the view of the Bernese Alps, including the Niederhorn, Niesen, Stockhorn and Eiger, Mönch, and Jungfrau peaks.
- The Wocher Panorama, the oldest remaining panorama drawing in the world.
- The Kunstmuseum Thun
- Schloss Schadau
- Panzermuseum Thun, with several World War II armored vehicles and weapons

=== Heritage sites of national significance ===
The Steamship Blüemlisalp, the former Hotel Bellevue-Du Parc, the former Hotel Thunerhof, the zum Rosengarten House, the Landsitz Bellerive, the armory (Mannschaftskaserne), the former hospital at Platzschulhaus, the Rathaus (Town council house), the Reformed Church of Scherzligen and the Sammlung Historisches Armeematerial (Collection of Historical Military Equipment) are listed as Swiss heritage site of national significance.

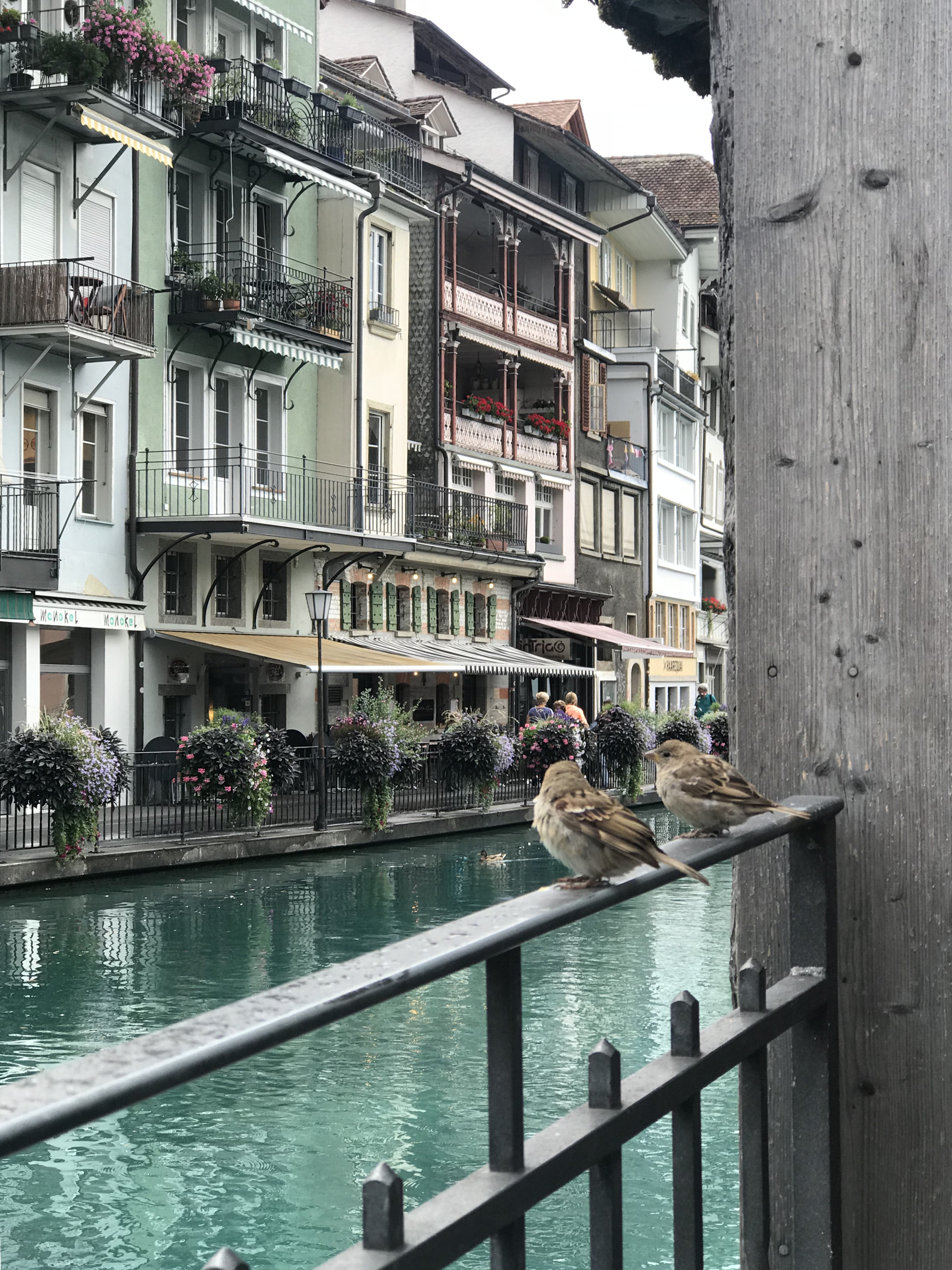
Thun with birds

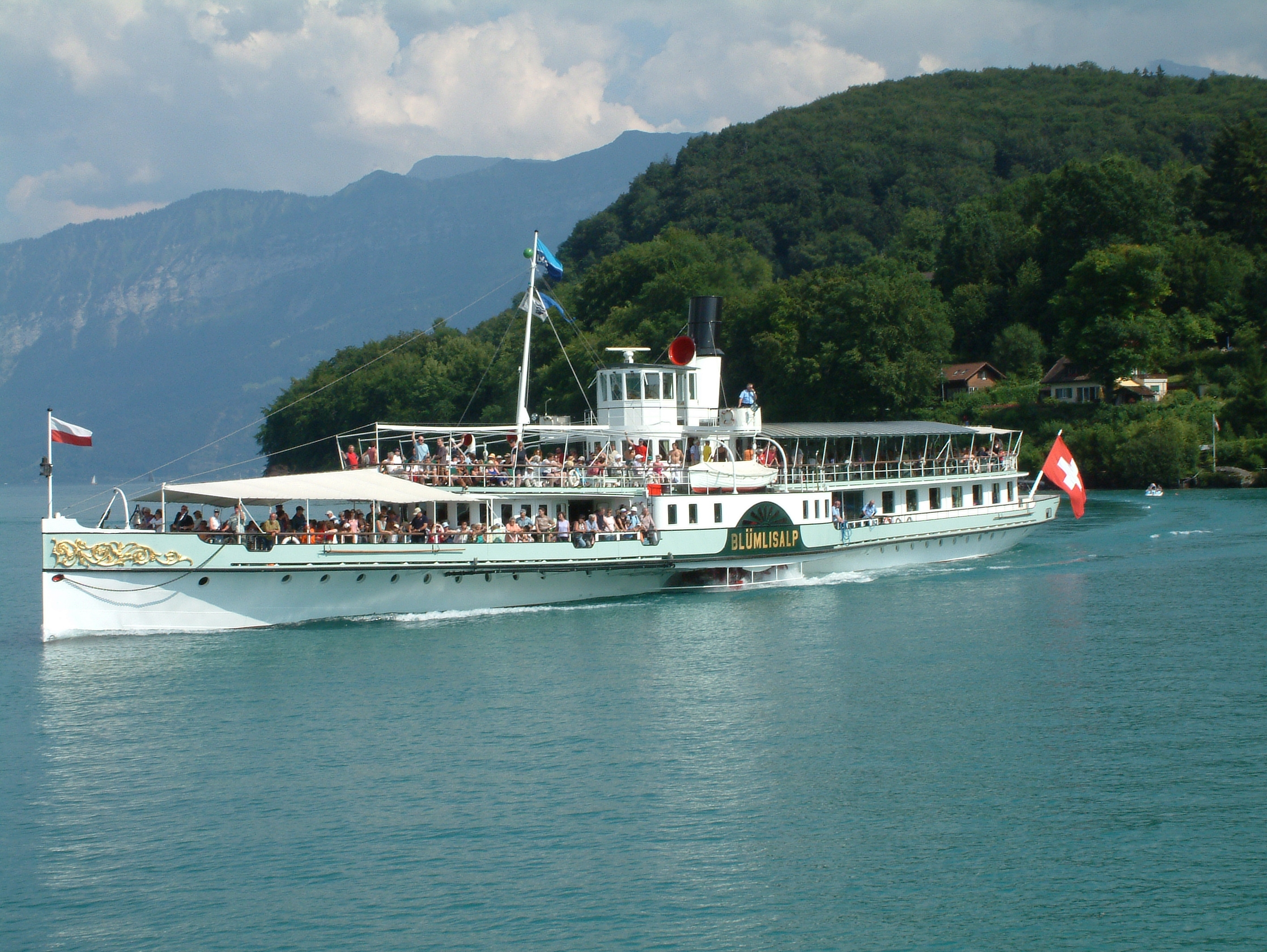
Steamship Blüemlisalp

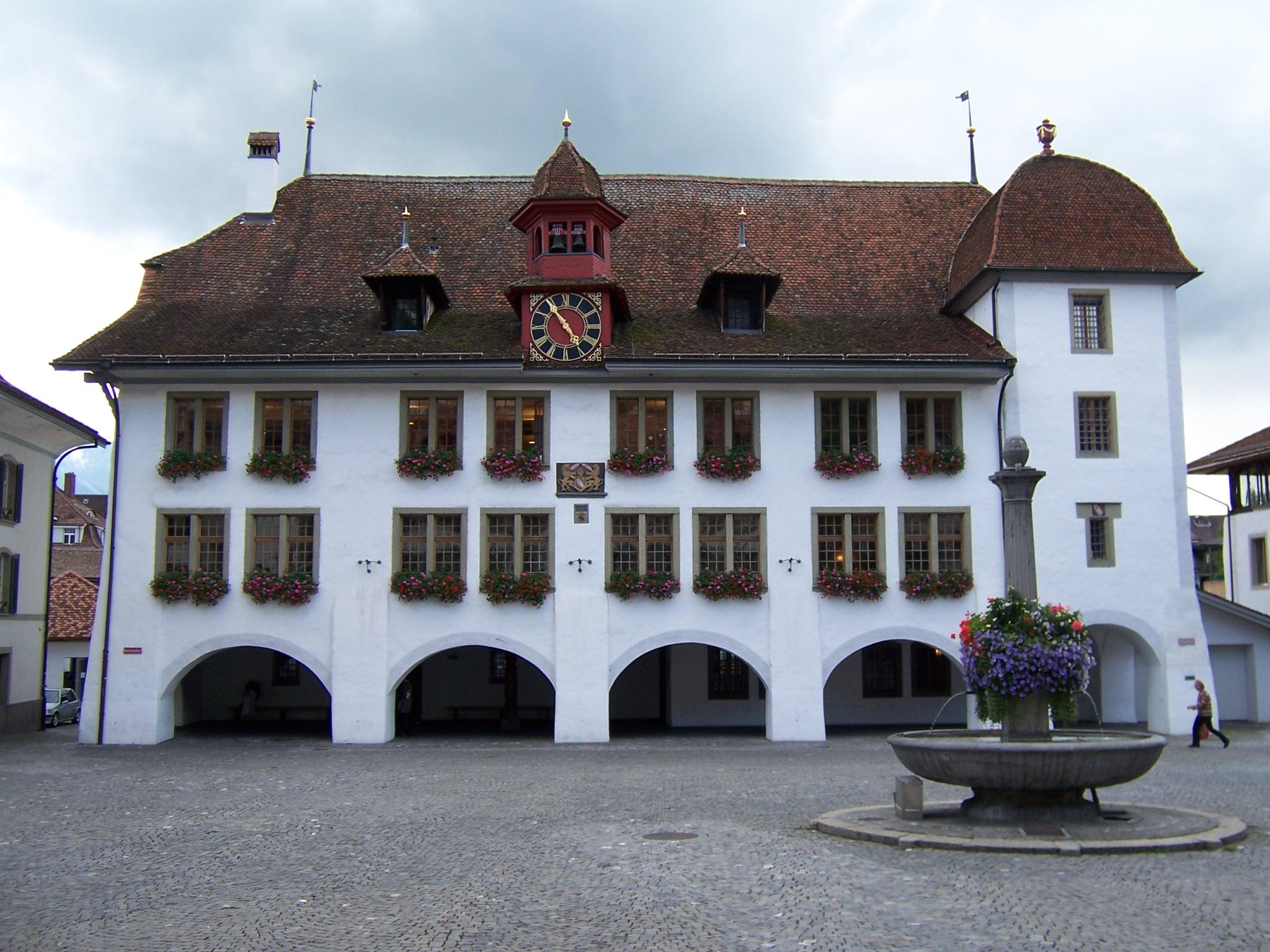
Town council house

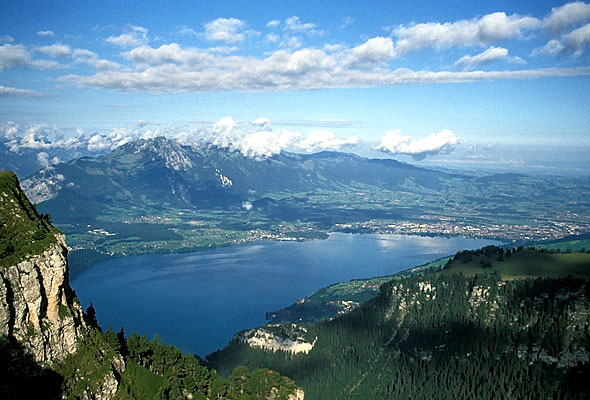
View of Thun and Lake Thun from the Niederhorn

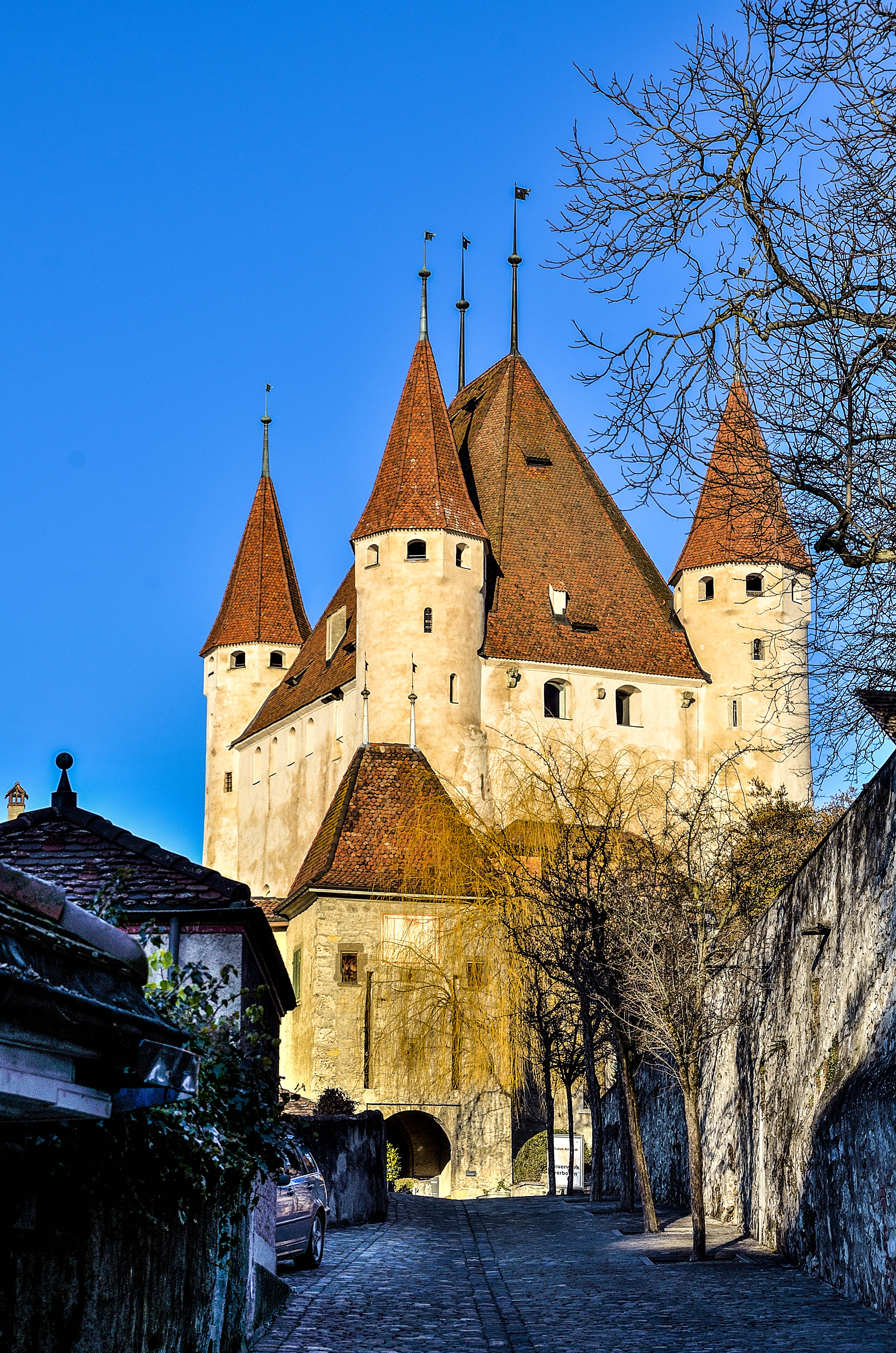
Thun Castle

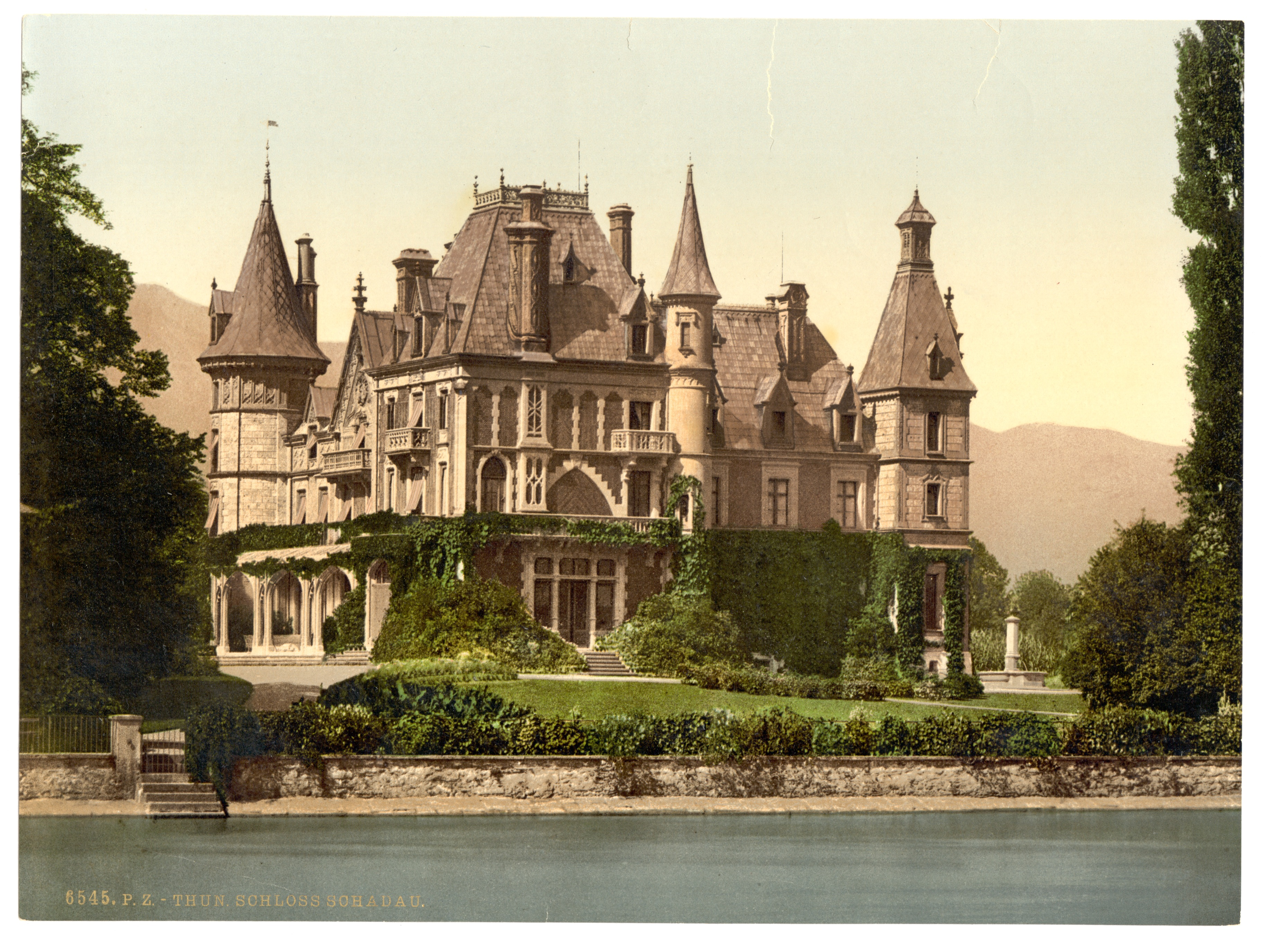
The Castle of Schadau in an early 20th-century image

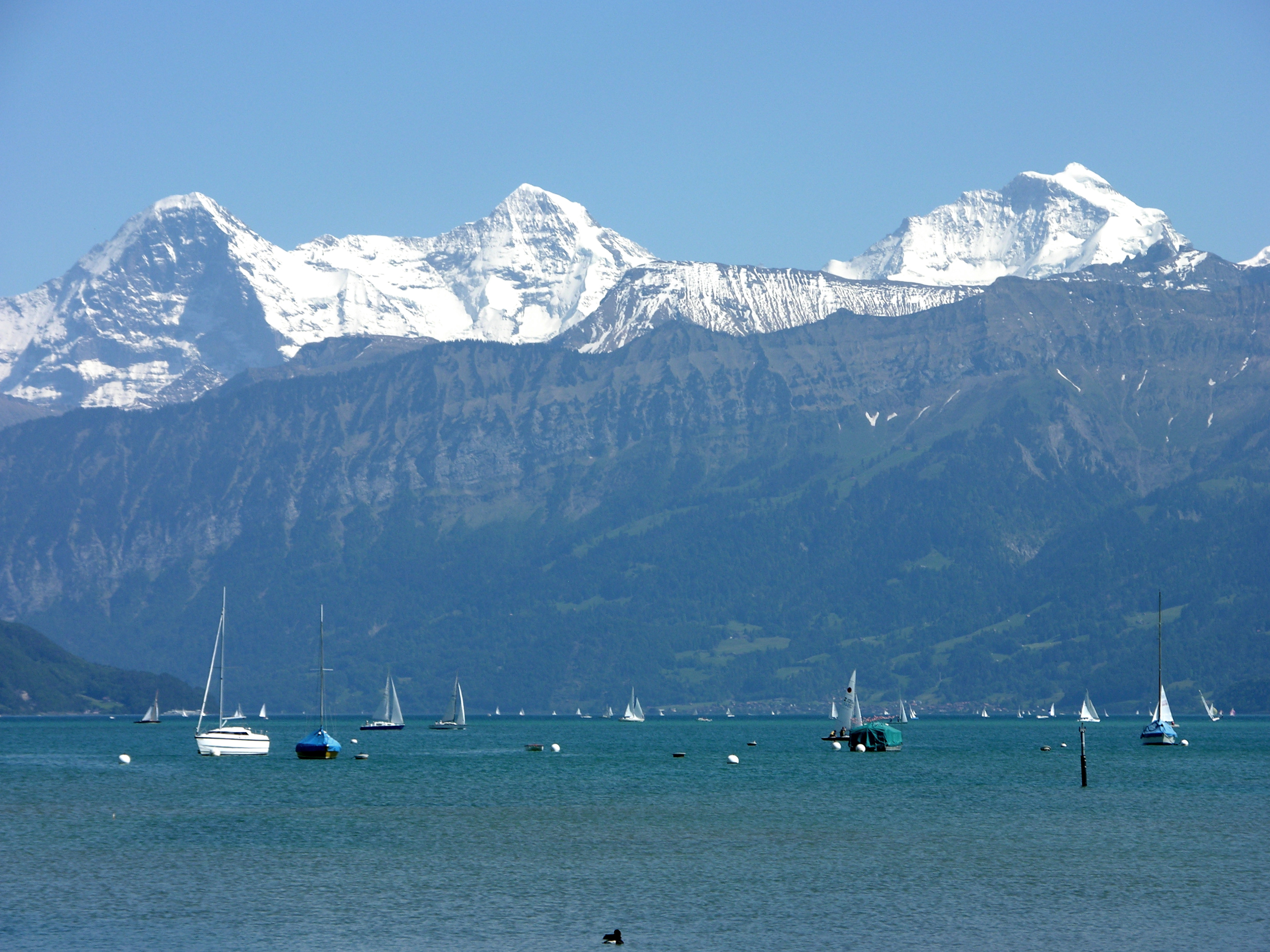
Eiger, Mönch and Jungfrau

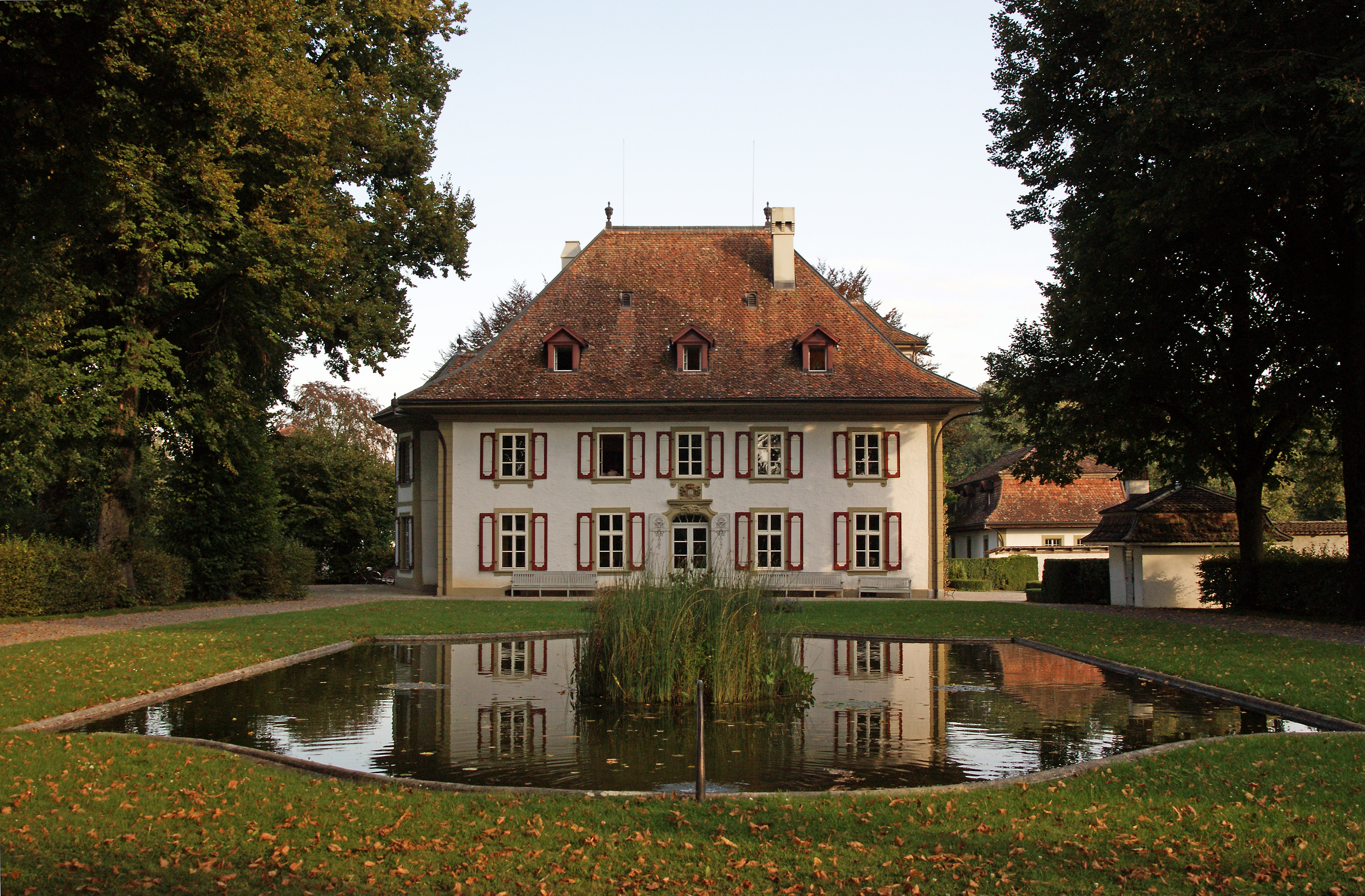
Landsitz Bellerive

== Education ==
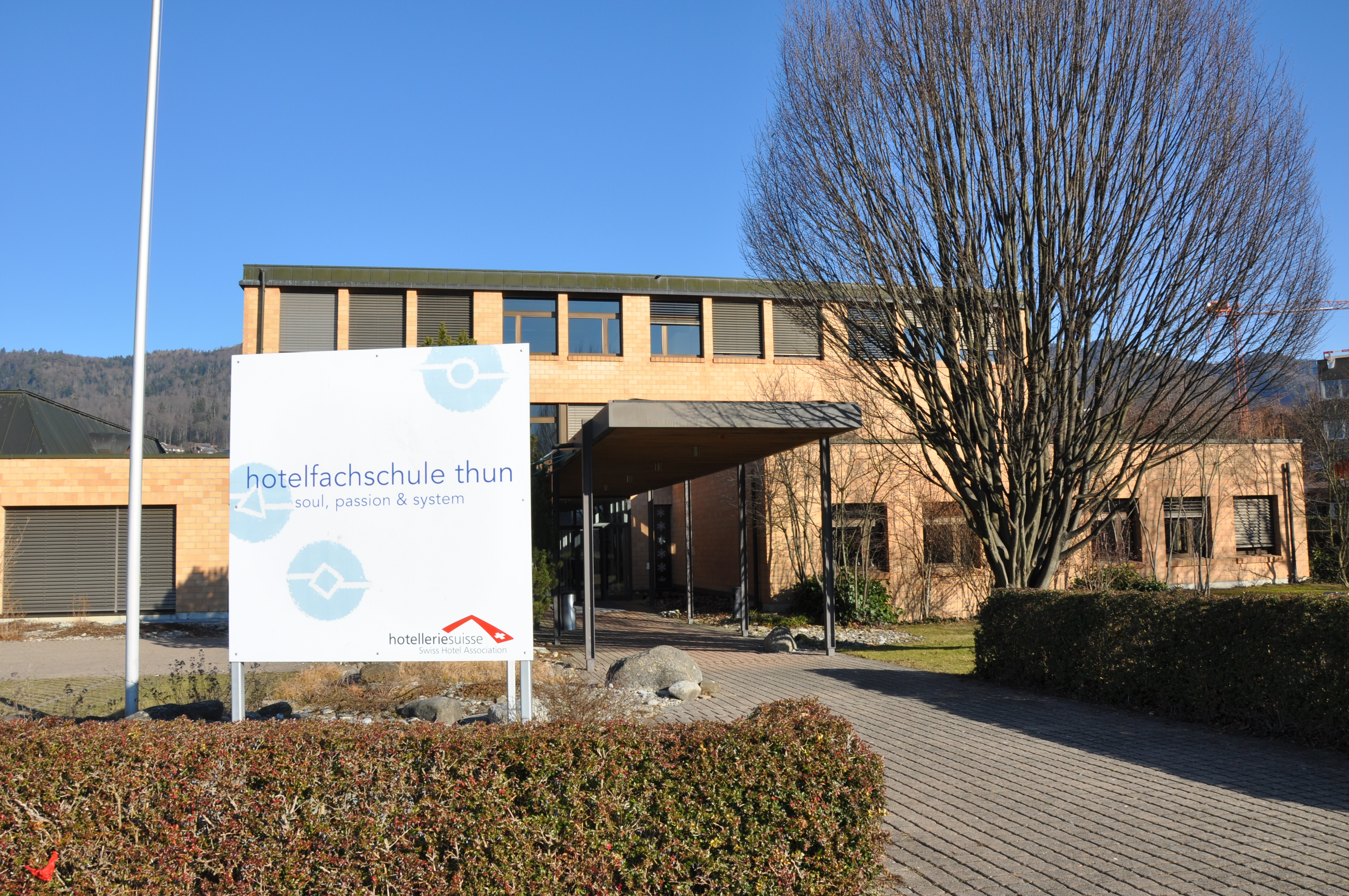
The Hotelfachschule (Hotel management school) in Thun

In Thun about 57.3% of the population have completed non-mandatory upper secondary education, and 17.6% have completed additional higher education (either university or a Fachhochschule). Of the 4,675 who had completed some form of tertiary schooling listed in the census, 68.6% were Swiss men, 22.5% were Swiss women, 5.8% were non-Swiss men and 3.1% were non-Swiss women.

The Canton of Bern school system provides one year of non-obligatory Kindergarten, followed by six years of Primary school. This is followed by three years of obligatory lower Secondary school where the students are separated according to ability and aptitude. Following the lower Secondary students may attend additional schooling or they may enter an apprenticeship.

During the 2012–13 school year, 3,923 students attended classes in Thun. There were 603 students in the German language kindergarten classes in the municipality. Of the kindergarten students, 18.7% were permanent or temporary residents of Switzerland (not citizens) and 29.9% have a different mother language than the classroom language. The municipality's primary school had 2,050 students in German language classes. Of the primary students, 15.7% were permanent or temporary residents of Switzerland (not citizens) and 26.3% have a different mother language than the classroom language. During the same year, the higher secondary school had a total of 1,270 students. There were 12.5% who were permanent or temporary residents of Switzerland (not citizens) and 23.1% have a different mother language than the classroom language.

As of 2000, 5,562 students attended a school in the municipality. Of those, 4,331 both lived and attended school in the municipality, while 1,231 came from another municipality. During the same year, 427 residents attended schools outside the municipality.

Thun is home to the Stadtbibliothek Thun library. The library has (as of 2008) 56,800 books or other media, and loaned out 330,316 items in the same year. It was open a total of 300 days with average of 35 hours per week during that year.

== Sports ==
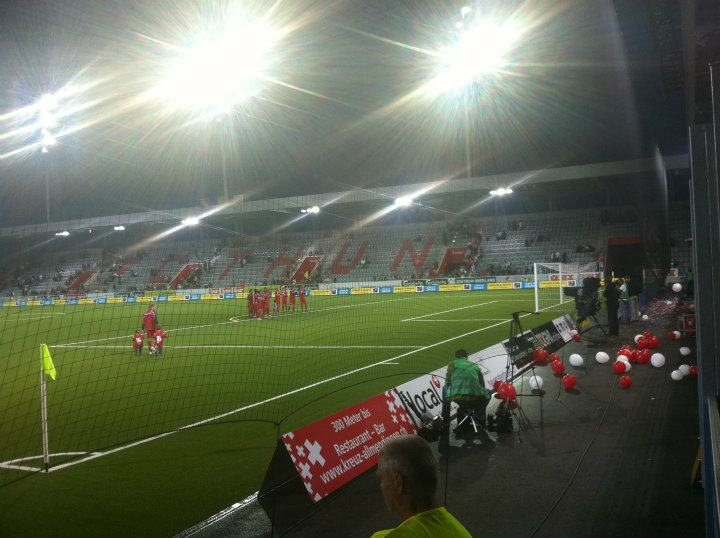
The Thun Arena at night

- Football: FC Thun plays in the Swiss Super League. Their home ground is Arena Thun. On 23 August 2005 FC Thun qualified for the group stages of the UEFA Champions League.
- Handball: Wacker Thun plays in the SHL. Their home ground is the 2,000-seat Sporthalle Lachen. They have won the swiss championship twice.
- Ice hockey : EHC Thun plays in the MySports League, the third tier of Swiss hockey. They play their home games in the 4,000-seat Grabengut.
- Orienteering: Thun hosted the 1981 World Orienteering Championships.
- Freestyle Kayak: Thun hosted the 2009 ICF Freestyle World Championships.
- Thun Tigers: American football club that currently plays in the top division in Switzerland Nationalliga A (American football). The Tigers play their home games at Stadion Lachen in Thun which holds 10,000.

== In fiction ==
- A scene in the spy novel Smiley's People by John le Carré is set here.
- Robert Walser's 1913 short story Kleist in Thun is set here. The story is a fictional imagining of Heinrich Von Kleist's stay in the town in 1802.

== Notable residents ==
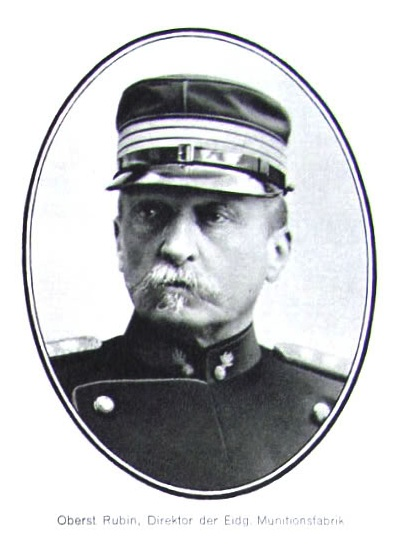
Kolonel Eduard Alexander Rubin, 1920

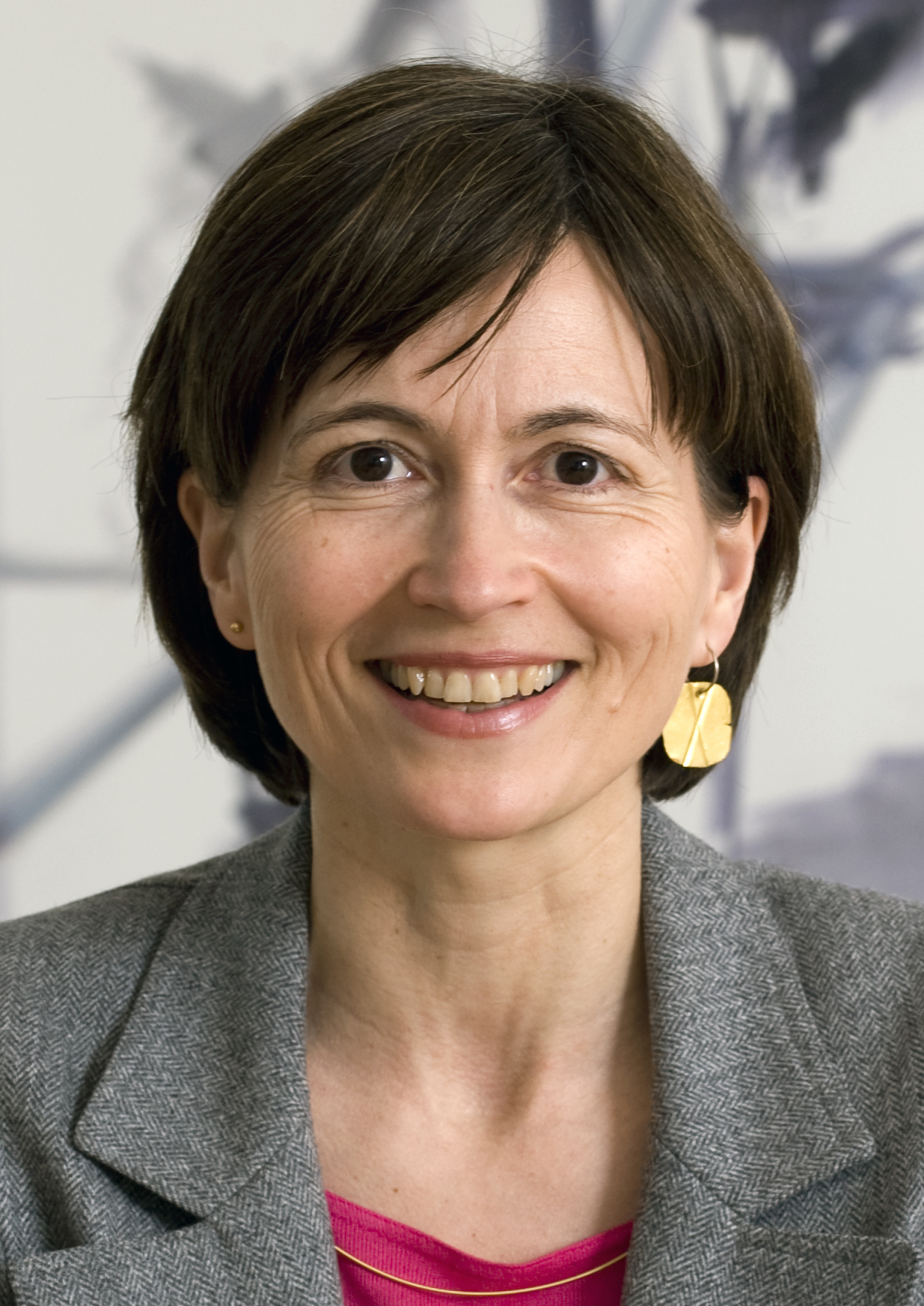
Regula Rytz

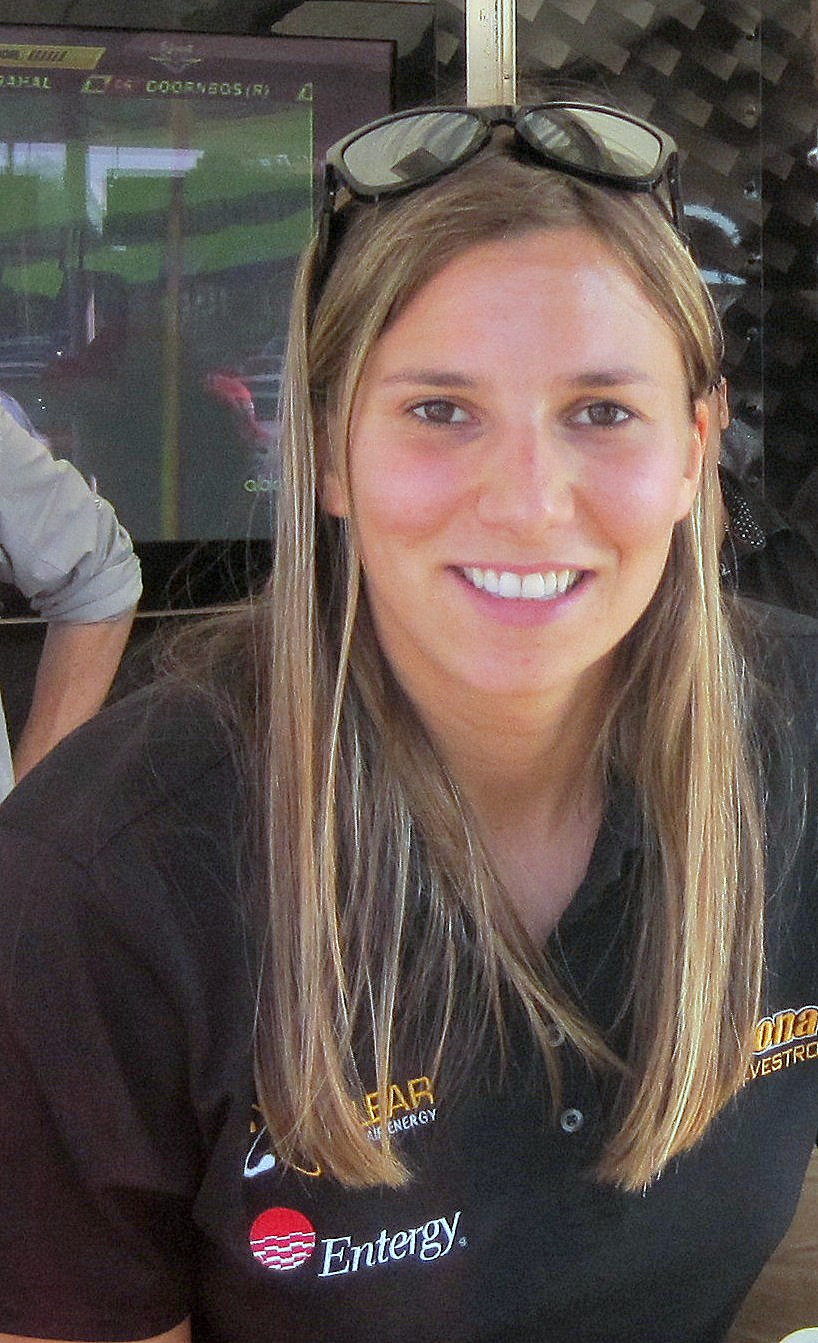
Simona de Silvestro, 2010

19th century

- Eduard Rubin (1846-1920), a Swiss mechanical engineer, invented the full metal jacket bullet
- Niklaus Gerber (1850-1914), a Swiss dairy chemist and industrialist
- Edward Bullough (1880–1934), an English aesthetician and scholar of modern languages
- Renée Schwarzenbach-Wille (1883–1959), a passionate horsewoman, photographer and music-lover about which she kept a photographic diary
- Markus Feldmann (1897–1958), a Swiss politician, member of the Swiss Federal Council 1951-1958

20th century

- Drs. P (Heinz Hermann Polzer) (1919–2015), a Swiss singer-songwriter, poet, and prose writer in the Dutch language
- Jean Ziegler (born 1934), politician, professor and author
- Guy Bovet (born 1942), a Swiss organist and composer
- Alexandre Dubach (born 1955), a Swiss violinist
- Peter Maurer (born 1956), President of the International Committee of the Red Cross since 2012
- Stefan Haenni (born 1958), a Swiss painter and a crime novel writer
- Regula Rytz (born 1962), politician, sociologist and historian
- Philipp Fankhauser (born 1964), a Swiss blues musician and songwriter
- Sandra Moser (born 1969), a Swiss stage and film actress

Sport

- Heinz Schneiter (1935–2017), a football player and manager
- Hanspeter Latour (born 1947), a football manager and former goalkeeper
- Walter Balmer (1948-2010), an international footballer, played 20 games for the national side
- Ralph Pichler (born 1954), a bobsledder, competed at the 1984 Winter Olympics
- Markus Eggler (born 1969), a retired curler, competed in the 2002 and 2010 Winter Olympics
- Bruno Kernen (born 1972), an alpine ski racer, bronze medallist in the 2006 Winter Olympics
- Ivan Rieder (born 1976), a Nordic combined skier, competed in the 2006 Winter Olympics
- Marc Schneider (born 1980), a footballer, played over 330 games, current manager of FC Thun
- Patrick von Allmen, (born 1985), luger
- Zdravko Kuzmanovic, (born 1987), a footballer
- Simona de Silvestro (born 1988), a race car driver
- Stjepan Kukuruzović (born 1989), a Swiss-born Croatian footballer
- Nico Müller (born 1992), a race car driver

== See also ==
- Thunerseespiele
