= Mesdag =

Mesdag may refer to:

- Taco Mesdag (1829–1902), Dutch banker and painter
- Hendrik Willem Mesdag (1831–1915), Dutch marine painter
  - Museum Mesdag, in The Hague, Netherlands
  - Panorama Mesdag, a 1881 panorama
  - Sina Mesdag-van Houten (1834–1909), wife of Hendrik Willem Mesdag
- Rob van Mesdag (1930–2018), Dutch Olympic rower
- Jan Mesdag (1953–1988), Dutch singer
