= Betzy Akersloot-Berg =

Norwegian-born seascape painter (1850-1922)

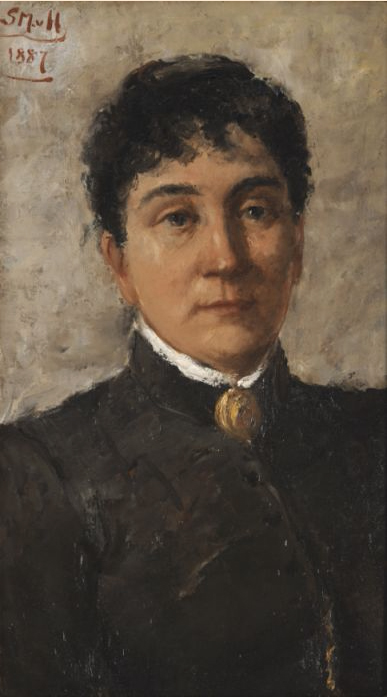
Betzy Akersloot-Berg, by Sientje van Houten (1887)

Betzy Rezora Akersloot-Berg (16 December 1850 – 18 December 1922) was a Norwegian-born seascape and landscape painter who spent most of her career on the Dutch island of Vlieland in Friesland.

== Biography ==
She was born in the village of Aurskog in Akershus, Norway. Her parents, Casper Cristiansen Berg (1828-1914) and Bartha Nordbye (1829-1912) were landowners. Later, they moved to Christiania (now Oslo) where her father became a businessman.

Originally, she trained as a nurse, then worked as a combination nurse and missionary among the Sami in Finnmark. However, she found herself attracted to painting and ultimately decided to take lessons at the Norwegian National Academy of Craft and Art Industry (Statens håndverks- og kunstindustriskole), where she studied with Wilhelm von Hanno and Frits Thaulow. Later, she worked with Otto Sinding and followed him when he moved to Munich in Germany.

During a trip to Vienna, she saw some works by the Dutch marine painter, Hendrik Willem Mesdag, which greatly impressed her. In 1885, she had a chance meeting with him and his family. This led to studies with him at his workshop in The Hague. She became close friends with his wife, Sientje van Houten, who painted a portrait of her. In 1890, she studied briefly with Puvis de Chavannes in Paris.

Through them, she met Gooswinus Gerardus Akersloot (1843-1929), the former mayor of Hoevelaken, who had recently lost his wife. They were married in 1893. Three years later, they settled in Oost-Vlieland where they bought the oldest house in town and named it "Tromp's Huys", in honor of Admiral Cornelis Tromp. Although isolated, she travelled every summer and was able to participate in exhibitions throughout Europe. She traveled to the coast of Norway as well as to other European coastal communities to paint coastal landscapes. In addition to painting, she ran a Sunday School and a sewing society for girls. She remained there until her death in 1922.

"Tromp's Huys" became a museum in 1956. Most of her approximately 300 works are kept there and sent out for exhibits, including a major retrospective at the Noordelijk Scheepvaartmuseum in 1992. They were also shown at a special exhibition in Aurskog (1996), and another at the Nordkappmuseet in Honningsvåg, near the place where she worked with the Sami (2004).

== Selected paintings ==
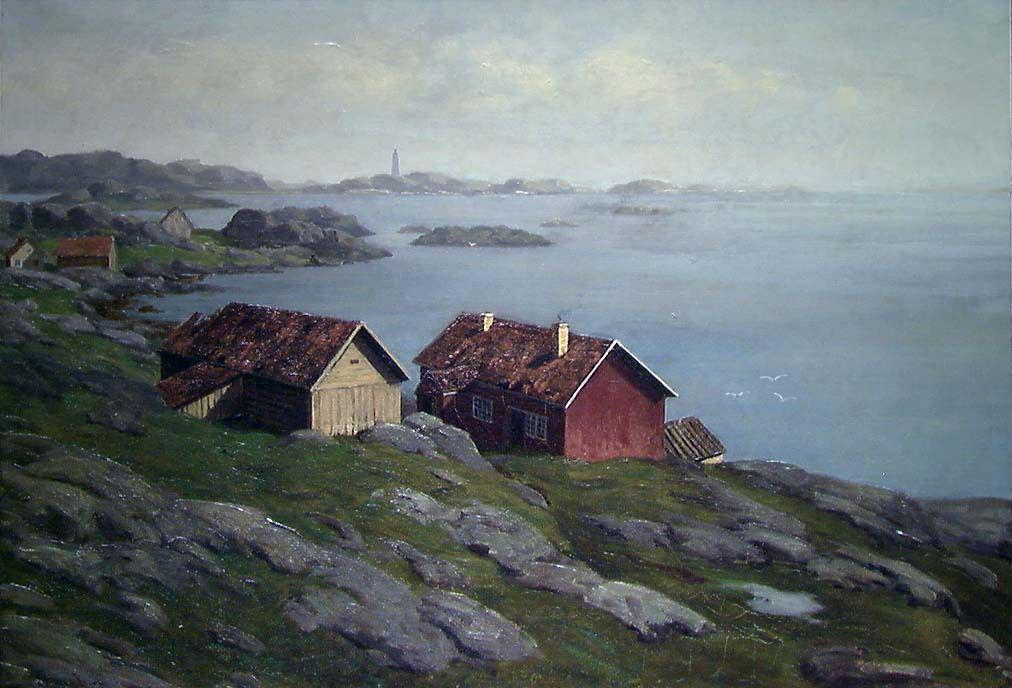
Coastal Landscape in Norway

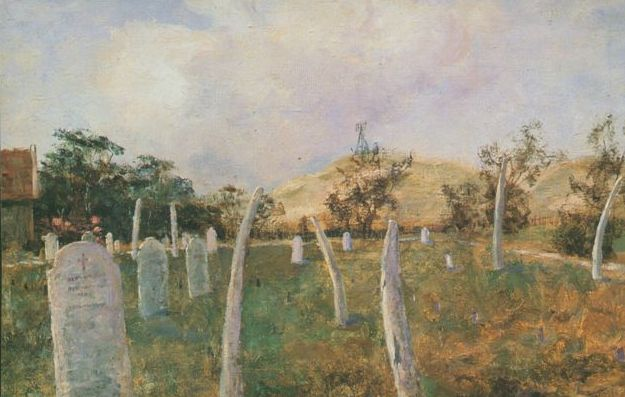
Cemetery with Whalebone Grave Markers

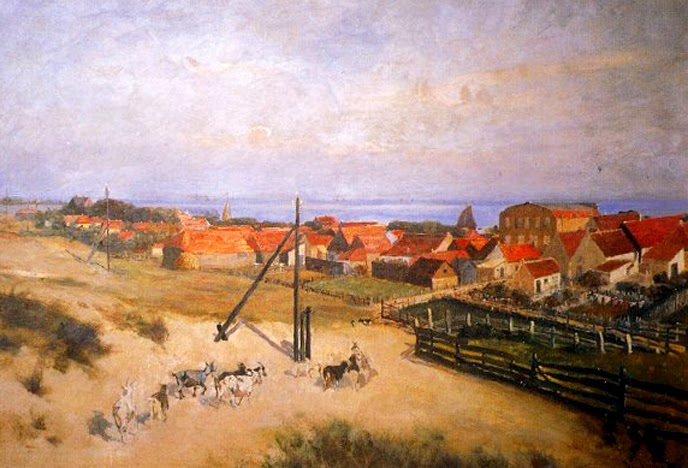
Oost-Vlieland

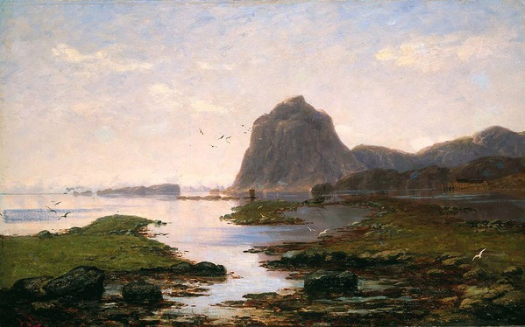
Lofoten
