= International Panorama Council =

Professional media association

The International Panorama Council (IPC) is a nongovernmental, not-for-profit organization, subject to Swiss law. It is a global network involving museum directors, managers, artists, restorers and historians who deal with the historical or the contemporary art and media forms of the panorama. The organization comprises members from all over the world who are either representatives of museums and research institutes or private researchers and enthusiasts. The organization was founded in 1992 as the European Panorama Conference in Szeged, Hungary, and renamed in 1998 in Altötting, Germany, at the International Panorama Conference. Since 2003 the organization is called International Panorama Council. IPC has been a Membership Association since 2010. It is governed by a member-elected Executive Board whose Secretary-general acts as the operational center for the Board’s members.

== Main goals ==
The purpose of the International Panorama Council is to stimulate worldwide research and communication about existing and future panoramas and cycloramas, advocate for and help preserve the few surviving heritage panoramas, and promote professional affiliation. IPC serves as a bridge connecting the heritage era of the panorama art form to its contemporary and future manifestations, and strives to facilitate the formal international recognition and protection of panoramas by organizations like UNESCO and the Council of Europe. The International Panorama Council actively supports the preservation of historical panoramas and cycloramas. In 2007 and 2008 it started a lobbying campaign to save the endangered panorama painting and building in Innsbruck, Austria. An initiative was taken to support the protection of the endangered Panorama Mesdag. A further goal of the IPC is to have the most important historical panoramas from 19c. enrolled as UNESCO World Heritage sites. A first step has been taken in July 2008 when the Waterloo Panorama was added to Belgium's tentative proposal for the UNESCO list. In February 2009 Panorama Mesdag applied for inclusion in the tentative list of the Netherlands.

== Activities ==
IPC is active in the fields of restoration, research, financing, exhibiting and marketing of panoramas and related art forms from the heritage era to its contemporary and future manifestations. IPC maintains a database of existing panoramas/cycloramas, Moving panoramas, large-scale dioramas and semi-circle panoramas and many other related art and media forms.

== Annual conferences ==
Since 1992 the International Panorama Council has held annual conferences throughout the world. The conferences are planned to provide a meaningful, professional exchange of ideas with lunches and dinners included, and a joint post-conference excursion to a panorama related site. Presentations in the conference proceedings range from illustrated essays on topographical mapping to restoration and conservation techniques.

- 1992 Szeged-Ópusztaszer, Hungary: Past, Present and Future of Panoramas, founding conference of IPC as a European-based group of interest. In cooperation with Móra Ferenc Museum, Szeged
- 1993 Bonn, Germany: Sehsucht – Eräugnis und Ent-Täuschung, über die Veränderung der visuellen Wahrnehmung im 20. Jahrhundert. In cooperation with Kunst- und Ausstellungshalle, Bonn
- 1994 Wrocław, Poland: 100th Anniversary of the Panorama Racławicka
- 1995 Szeged-Ópusztaszer, Hungary: Inauguration of the Feszty Panorama (Arrival of the Hungarians)
- 1996 Innsbruck, Austria: 100th Anniversary of Panorama "Battle of Mt. Isel"
- 1998 Altötting, Germany, The World of Panoramas, Panoramas of the World, 1st IPC World Conference
- 1999 Lucerne, Switzerland, The ongoing restoration Bourbaki Panorama
- 2000 Szeged-Ópusztaszer, Hungary, Panoramas and Tourism, PR and Management
- 2001 Beijing, China, Panorama Development and Maintenance. In cooperation with The Museum of the War of Chinese People's Resistance Against Japanese Aggression at Beijing
- 2002 Pleven, Bulgaria, 25th Anniversary of the Panorama 'Battle of Pleven'. In cooperation with the Military Historical Museums and the Pleven Epopee 1877 Panorama
- 2003 Altötting/Lorsch, Germany, 100th anniversary of panorama "Jerusalem on the Day of the Crucifixion" and opening of "Stauffer Panorama" at the Lorsch Abbey
- 2004 New York City, United States, Panoramas in the Old World and the New. In cooperation with Hunter College
- 2005 Shenyang, China, Panorama Conservation and Restoration Technology. In cooperation with Lu Xun Academy of Fine Arts
- 2006 The Hague, Netherlands, The Quest for Illusion – 125th Anniversary of Panorama Mesdag
- 2007 New Haven, United States, New Perspectives on the Panorama. In cooperation with Yale Center for British Art, Yale University
- 2007 Plymouth, United Kingdom, Panoramas in the Virtual World. In cooperation with Innovate – Centre for Creative Industries, University of Plymouth
- 2008 Leipzig/Dresden, Germany, Spatial Simulation and the Future of Panorama. In cooperation with Asisi Factory GmbH, Berlin
- 2009 Brussels, Belgium, Panorama Redevelopment: Restoration and Repositioning. In cooperation with the Royal Museum of the Armed Forces and of Military History
- 2010 Istanbul, Turkey, Panoramas Bridging Cultures and Time. In cooperation with the Culture Co., a subsidiary of the Greater City of Istanbul
- 2011 Gettysburg, United States, Preserving and Understanding the Battlefield Panorama Heritage. In cooperation with the Gettysburg Foundation
- 2012 Pleven, Bulgaria, Historic Battles in Panorama Format messages and challenges. In cooperation with the Military Historical Museums and the Pleven Epopee 1877 Panorama
- 2013 Lucerne, Switzerland, Panoramic Spectacles – A Tourist Attraction Then and Now
- 2014 Altötting, Germany, The Panoramic Experience: Real – Virtual – Spiritual. In cooperation with the Foundation for the Panorama Altötting
- 2015 Namur, Belgium, Layers of History: Panoramas from Classical to Digital Age. In cooperation with the City of Namur the University of Namur and the Luxembourg City History Museum
- 2016 Ópusztaszer, Hungary, Fiction and Reality in Panoramas. In cooperation with the Ópusztaszer National Heritage Park and the Feszty-Panorama
- 2017 New York City-Queens, United States, (Re)Thinking The Panorama. In cooperation with the Queens Museum
- 2018 Istanbul, Turkey, Memory and the Panorama. In cooperation with the Panorama 1453 History Museum, Istanbul.
- 2019 Atlanta, United States, Panoramic Ironies. In cooperation with the Atlanta History Center, Atlanta, United States.
- 2020 Bursa, Turkey, Online 29th International Panorama Council Conference. In cooperation with the Panorama 1326 Bursa Conquest Museum, Bursa, Turkey.
- 2021 New Bedford, United States, Online 30th International Panorama Council Conference. Hosted by the New Bedford Whaling Museum, New Bedford, Massachusetts
- 2022 Luxembourg, Luxembourg, 31st International Panorama Council Conference. Hosted by Lëtzebuerg City Museum, Grand Duchy of Luxembourg, Luxembourg.
- 2023 Iowa City, United States, 32nd International Panorama Council Conference. Hosted by University of Iowa Museum of Natural History Iowa City, Iowa, US, Panoramas.

== See also ==
- Panoramic painting
- Cosmorama
- Immersion (virtual reality)
- Virtual reality
