= Sergent =

Sergent may refer to:

== Places ==
- Sergent, Kentucky

== People ==
- Annette Sergent
- Bernard Sergent (born 1946), French ancient historian and comparative mythologist
- Brian Sergent
- Brian Sergent (footballer)
- Harold Sergent
- Jesse Sergent
- Lucien-Pierre Sergent (1849–1904), French academic painter
- Matthew Sergent, American politician
- Michel Sergent (born 1943), French politician
- René Sergent (1865–1927), French architect
- Stéphane Sergent (born 1973), French footballer

== See also ==
- Sergeant (disambiguation)
