= Greater Britain Exhibition =

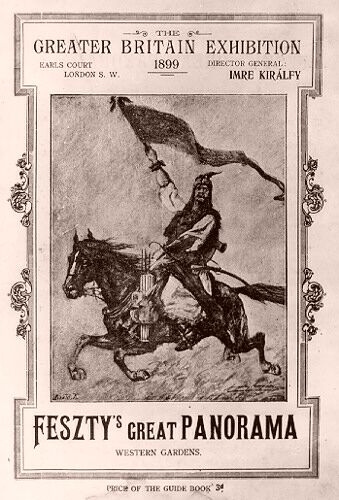
- Advertising for the Feszty Panorama at the exhibition

Overview
- BIE-class: Unrecognized exposition
- Name: Greater Britain Exhibition
- Organized by: Imre Kiralfy Director General

Location
- Country: United Kingdom
- City: London
- Venue: Earls Court Exhibition Centre
- Coordinates: 51.489°N 0.198°W

Timeline
- Opening: 8 May 1899

The Greater Britain Exhibition was a colonial exhibition held at Earls Court, London, in 1899 and opened by Prince George, Duke of Cambridge. on 8 May 1899.

== Exhibits ==
Exhibits included a mineral exhibition from Victoria colony; a 120-metre-long (390 ft) cyclorama, Arrival of the Hungarians (also known as the Feszty Panorama); a model gold mine; and a twice-daily equestrian show called "Savage South Africa", directed by Frank E. Fillis, which inspired the 1899 silent film Major Wilson's Last Stand.

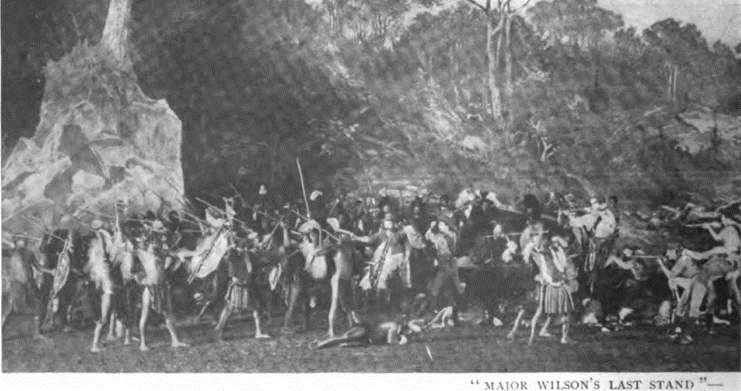
The final scene from "Savage South Africa"

One of the gold medals awarded by the exhibition was won by Hans Irvine.
