= Cosmorama (disambiguation) =

Cosmorama may refer to:

- Cosmorama, São Paulo, a municipality in the state of São Paulo in Brazil.
- Cosmorama, a perspective picture of the landmarks of the world.
- Cosmorama an entertainment in 19th century London involving cosmorama images.
- Kosmorama is the name of Trondheim International Film Festival in Norway.
