= Sergen =

Sergen may refer to:

== People ==
=== Given name ===
- Sergen Piçinciol (born 1995), Turkish footballer
- Sergen Yalçın (born 1972), Turkish football commentator, coach and former international footballer
- Sergen Yatağan (born 1999), Turkish footballer

=== Surname ===
- Burak Sergen (born 1961), Turkish actor

== Places ==
- Sergen, Hani, a village in the Hani District of Diyarbakır Province in Turkey

== See also ==
- Sergent (disambiguation)
