= Port-au-Prince Cosmorama =

Port-au-Prince Cosmorama was an exhibition of perspective pictures of different places and landmarks in the world, held on March 2, 1834 in Port-au-Prince, Haiti.

== Cosmoramic Views Exhibited ==
1. View of Paris, with Place Vendôme and the beautiful high column by Napoéon.
2. View the Père Lachaise cemetery in Paris, presenting the graves of Molière, Lafontaine Delisle, Grétri etc.
3. View of the beautiful and pistoresque fall of Te-quendama in Colombia, near Santa Fe de Bogota.
4. Perspective view of Madrid and the palace King of Spain.
5. Interior view of London with a view of the Thames from Black Friars Bridge, the prospect of the beautiful church of St. Paul.
6. View of the Battle of New Orleans, between the Americans and the English. (January 8, 1815)
