= Kosmorama =

Film festival in Trondheim, Norway

- Location: Trondheim, Norway
- Founded: 12 April 2005
- Language: International
- Website: http://www.kosmorama.no

Kosmorama is the annual international film festival in the city of Trondheim, Norway first held in 2005.

== Festival name ==
The word “kosmorama” (in English: cosmorama) means an exhibition of perspective pictures of (usually) landmarks of the world. In other words: a display of different perspectives and vistas from around the World.

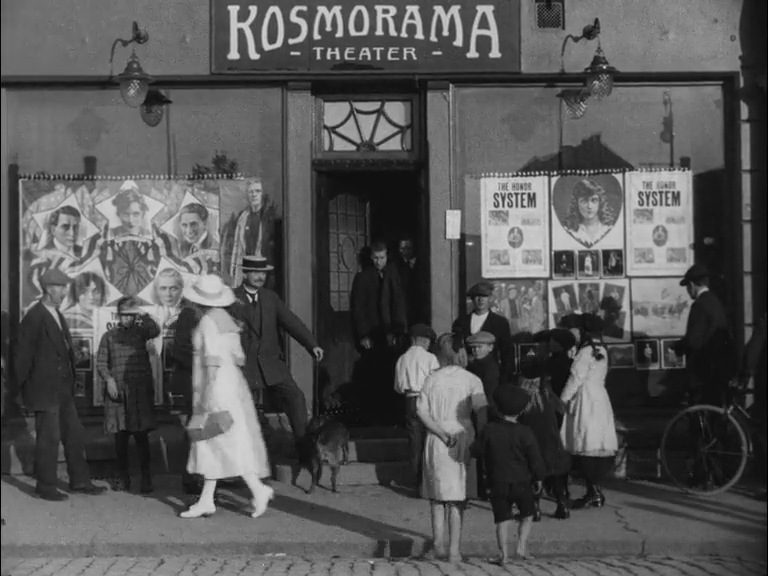
The Kosmorama Theater

The film festival has been named Kosmorama after one of Trondheim's first big cinemas. Kosmorama Theater was founded in 1910 by Paul Kraüsslich. In addition to running the cinema, Kraüsslich travelled all around the country, filming everything from the fisheries in Lofoten to the World Speed Skating Championship. In 1906, he filmed the coronation of King Haakon VII of Norway in the Nidaros Cathedral in Trondheim, and was able to show his film of that event just three hours later to the public. In 1908, he had the additional honour of showing films for the Royal Family at The Royal Palace Stiftsgården in Trondheim.

== Organization ==
The Kosmorama Film Festival is owned and run by the limited company Filmfest Trondheim AS, which is a subsidiary of Trondheim Kino AS. Trondheim Kino is entirely owned by the Municipality of Trondheim, which during the autumn of 2003 took the initiative to establish a film festival. The festival's goal is to strengthen the film medium in the region of Middle Norway and to contribute to innovations in the intersection between film, culture and business life.

== Profile ==
Instead of employing one chief of programming, Kosmorama employs the permanent services of three film curators, responsible for their own film program which together constitutes the main program. The curators are Eli Gjerde, Ola Lund Renolen and Sindre Kartvedt.

== Awards ==
Kosmorama Film Festival has a number of competitions and awards. There is a prize for new talents who pitch their ideas for a film to a professional jury in front of an audience. The winner of the competition will receive 100,000 Norwegian kroner in development support, and be one step closer to realize their dream of producing their own film.

=== Kanon ===
Kanonprisen (The Kanon Award) is Norway's equivalent to the Academy Awards. The members of the different unions in the movie industry can vote for Best actor, actor in a supporting role, edit, sound mix, cinematography, script producer and finally, best director. These awards are given out in a grand show during the festival and most of Norway's film industry is present.

In addition to these awards the public can vote for their favorite Norwegian film from the previous year, for Folkets Kanonpris (The People's Kanon Award).

== Prominent guests ==
Kosmorama has been visited by many national and international film celebrities. Most notably Oscar winner writer/producer James Schamus and actor/director Liv Ullmann in 2006, director Peter Greenaway and writer/director John Sayles in 2008, Oscar winner writer/director Alexander Payne in 2011 and director Mohsen Makhmalbaf in 2013.

== See also ==
- Kosmorama - Official homepage
- Hollywood på trøndersk
- Filmvisning i Nidarosdomen
