= Cyclorama =

Panoramic painting on the inside of a cylindrical canvas

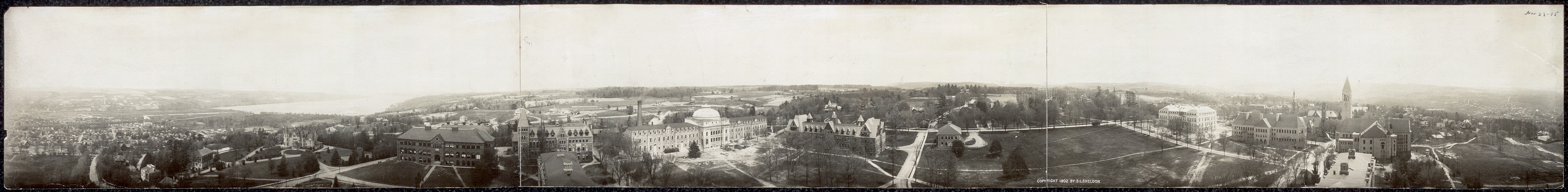
A cyclorama view of Cornell University from McGraw Hall embracing 360 degrees (1902)

A cyclorama is a panoramic image on the inside of a cylindrical platform, designed to give viewers standing in the middle of the cylinder a 360° view, and also a building designed to show a panoramic image. The intended effect is to make viewers, surrounded by the panoramic image, feel as if they were standing in the midst of the place depicted in the image.

== Background ==
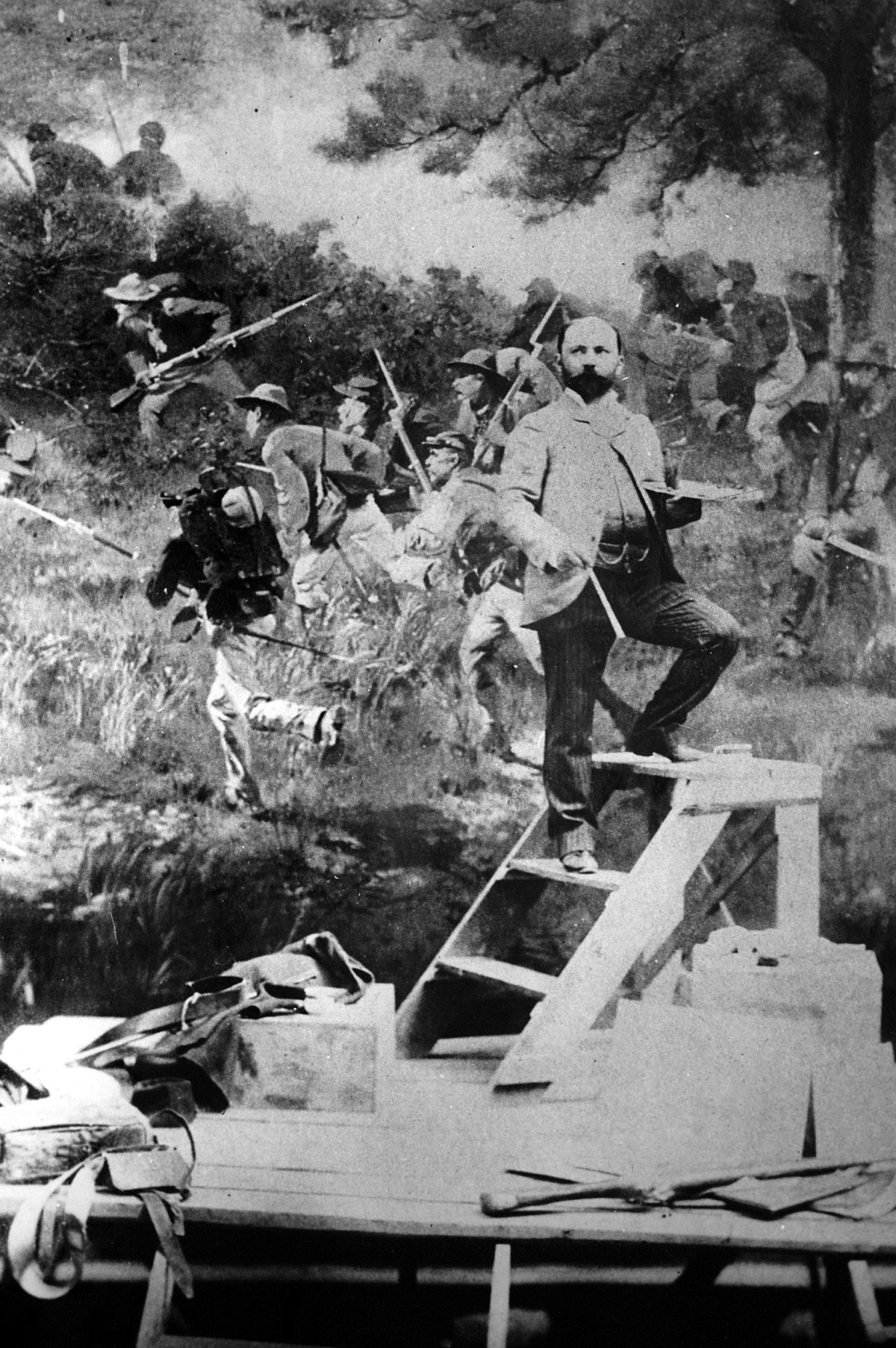
Paul Philippoteaux painting the Gettysburg Cyclorama circa 1883. From the archives of Gettysburg National Military Park

Panoramas were invented by Irish painter Robert Barker, who wanted to find a way to capture the panoramic view from Calton Hill in central Edinburgh, Scotland. He subsequently opened his first cyclorama building in Edinburgh in 1787.

Cycloramas were very popular in the late 19th century. The most popular traveled from city to city to provide local entertainment – much like a modern movie. As the viewers stood in the center of the painting, there would often be music and a narrator telling the story of the event depicted. Sometimes dioramas were constructed in the foreground to provide additional realism to the cyclorama. Most major cities had one; circular and hexagonal-shaped buildings were constructed in almost every major US and European city to provide a viewing space for the cycloramas. For example, a 360° depiction of the land and naval battles of Vicksburg was completed and first exhibited in Paris. This work by Lucien-Pierre Sergent and Joseph Bertrand traveled to New York, Chicago and San Francisco and Tokyo. In 1885 the Philadelphia Panorama Company installed the "Battle of Chattanooga" in two units in Kansas City and Philadelphia, it was painted by Eugen Bracht. In 1892 a cyclorama was made of the 1876 "Battle of Little Bighorn." Buffalo, New York has a surviving cyclorama building from 1888 that has long since been converted to use as private offices.

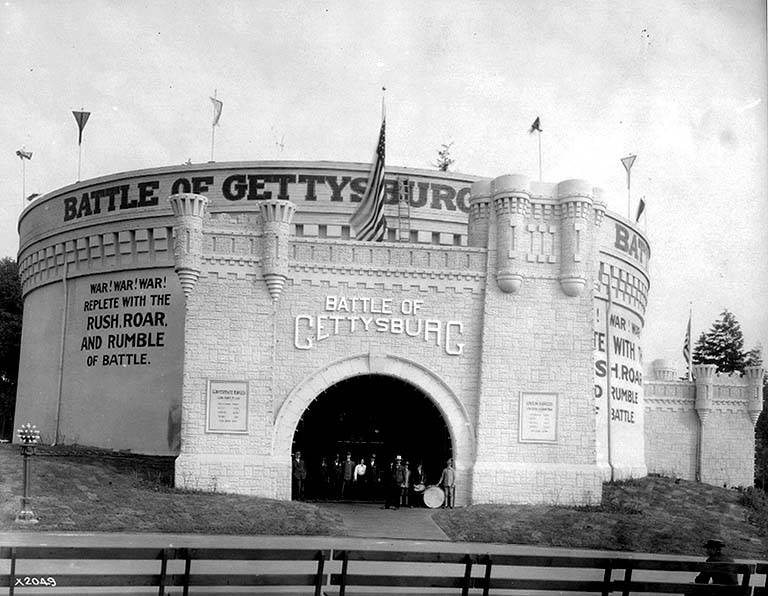
Battle of Gettysburg Cyclorama building at the Alaska Yukon Pacific Exhibition in 1909

Hundreds of cycloramas were produced; however, only about thirty survive.

An extension of this concept into motion pictures was pioneered with the invention of the Cinéorama that debuted at the 1900 Paris Exposition. This evolved into such formats as IMAX and Circle-Vision 360°.

== Ben-Hur dramatisation ==
The main action centerpiece of the 1899 play Ben-Hur was the use of a live chariot race using real horses and real chariots set against a cyclorama. The Era's drama critic detailed how it was achieved by "four great cradles, 20ft in length and 14ft wide, which are movable back and front on railways". The horses galloped full-pelt towards the audience, secured by invisible steel cable traces and running on treadmills. Electric rubber rollers spun the chariot wheels. A vast cyclorama backdrop revolved in the opposite direction to create an illusion of massive speed, and fans created clouds of dust. The critic for The Illustrated London News described it as "a marvel of stage-illusion" that was "memorable beyond all else". The Sketch's critic called it "thrilling and realistic ... enough to make the fortune of any play" and noted that "the stage, which has to bear 30 tons' weight of chariots and horses, besides huge crowds, has had to be expressly strengthened and shored up". It went on to inspire the multi-Oscar-winning 1959 film adaptation of Ben Hur, starring Charlton Heston – featuring the key live chariot race.

== Surviving examples ==
Some notable cycloramas are:

- Wocher-Panorama, depicting the city of Thun. On display in the Kunstmuseum Thun. 38 metres long by 7.5 metres high (Created by Marquard Wocher in 1814 it may be the oldest surviving example on display).
- Borodino Panorama, depicting the Battle of Borodino between Napoleon I of France and a Russian Army outside Moscow in 1812. On display in Moscow. 115 metres long by 15 metres high.
- Stalingrad Battle Panorama, depicting the Battle of Stalingrad between Nazi Germany army and the Russian Army in 1942–1943. On display in Volgograd, Russia. 120 metres long by 16 metres high (the biggest canvas of Russia).
- Pleven Panorama, depicting the Siege of Plevna in 1878, in Pleven, Bulgaria - also known as the panorama with the world's biggest canvas. 115 metres long by 15 metres high and 12-metre foreground.
- Racławice Panorama, depicting the Battle of Racławice during the Kościuszko Uprising is on display in Wrocław, Poland. 115 metres long by 15 metres high.
- Atlanta Cyclorama, depicting the Battle of Atlanta during the American Civil War is on display in Atlanta, Georgia
- Behalt Cyclorama, depicting the heritage of the Amish and Mennonite people, is on display at the Amish and Mennonite Heritage Center in Berlin, Ohio
- Gettysburg Cyclorama, depicting the Battle of Gettysburg during the U.S. Civil War is displayed at Gettysburg National Military Park, Pennsylvania. The version on display is the second of four known versions of this painting, and one of only two extant. The original was lost in 1933, and although rediscovered in 1965, has not returned to public display. The second version, originally created for a Boston exhibition, is now on display at the Gettysburg National Military Park Museum and Visitor Center.
- Cyclorama of Jerusalem, depicting Jesus Christ's Crucifixion is on display in Sainte-Anne-de-Beaupré, Quebec
- Waterloo Cyclorama, depicting the Battle of Waterloo is displayed in Belgium near the city of Waterloo
- 1973 October War panorama in Cairo, Egypt, depicting the attack on the Bar Lev Line and the subsequent fighting during the Yom Kippur/1973 October War between Israel and Egypt.
- The Riesenrundgemälde (giant circular painting) in Innsbruck, Austria, shows the Battles of Bergisel, still in its original building.
- Panorama Mesdag, depicting the Dutch village of Scheveningen in 1881, displayed in The Hague, Netherlands.
- Palace and Gardens of Versailles cyclorama, painted by John Vanderlyn on display in the American Wing at the Metropolitan Museum of Art in New York City.
- A modern recreation of a lost Bunker Hill Cyclorama, depicting the Battle of Bunker Hill, is displayed at the Bunker Hill Museum, along with a fragment of the study for the missing original.
- Arrival of the Hungarians (also called Feszty Panorama), by Árpád Feszty et al., completed in 1894. It was painted to commemorate the 1000th anniversary of the 895 AD conquest of the Carpathian Basin by the Hungarians. It is displayed at the Ópusztaszer National Heritage Park, Hungary.
- Taejon Cyclorama, depicting the Battle of Taejon. On display at the Victorious Fatherland Liberation War Museum in Pyongyang, North Korea.
- Fletcher's Mutiny Cyclorama, depicting the history of Norfolk Island and the Bounty mutiny.
- The Laysan Island Cyclorama at the University of Iowa Museum of Natural History, depicts the ecology of Laysan Island, near Hawaii. It was begun by Charles Cleveland Nutting and opened in 1914.
- The Panorama of the Battle of Lipany by Luděk Marold in Prague, in the Czech Republic.
- Panorama 1453 History Museum, depicting the Fall of Constantinople, in Istanbul, Turkey. It is a hemisphere 38 meters in diameter with a surface area of 2,350 m^{2}
- The October War Panorama in Damascus, Syria, a 3-D panorama of the Yom Kippur War, specifically the battle for Quneitra in the Golan Heights.
- The Altötting panorama in Altötting, Bavaria, a panorama depicting the Crucifixion.

== See also ==
- Cyclorama Building, Boston
- Cosmorama
- Diorama
- Eidophusikon
- Moving panorama
- Myriorama
- Panorama
- Panoramic painting
- Planetarium
- International Panorama Council
