= Árpád Feszty =

Hungarian artist (1856–1914)

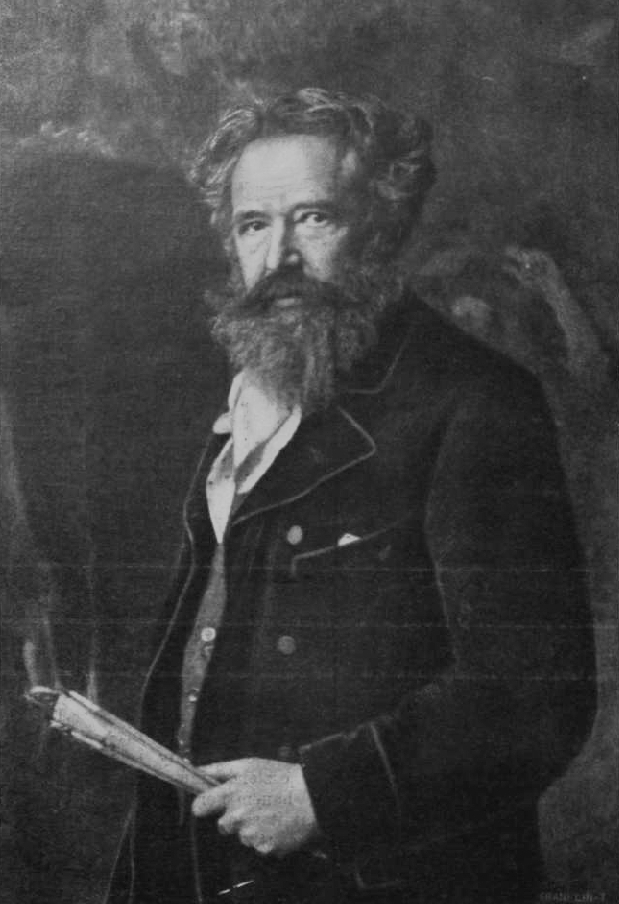
Árpád Feszty

Árpád Feszty (Hungarian: [ˈaːrpaːd ˈfɛsc]; 21 December 1856 – 1 June 1914) was a Hungarian painter. He was born in the town of Ógyalla (then Hungary, now Hurbanovo, Slovakia). His ancestors were German settlers (the original family name was Rehrenbeck). He was the fifth child of Silvester Rehrenbeck (1819–1910), an affluent landowner at Ógyalla, and his wife Jozefa (Linzmayer). Silvester was ennobled by the emperor on 21 April 1887, and the family thereafter took the name Martosi Feszty (or, in German: Feszty von Martos). Feszty mostly painted scenes from Hungarian history and religion.

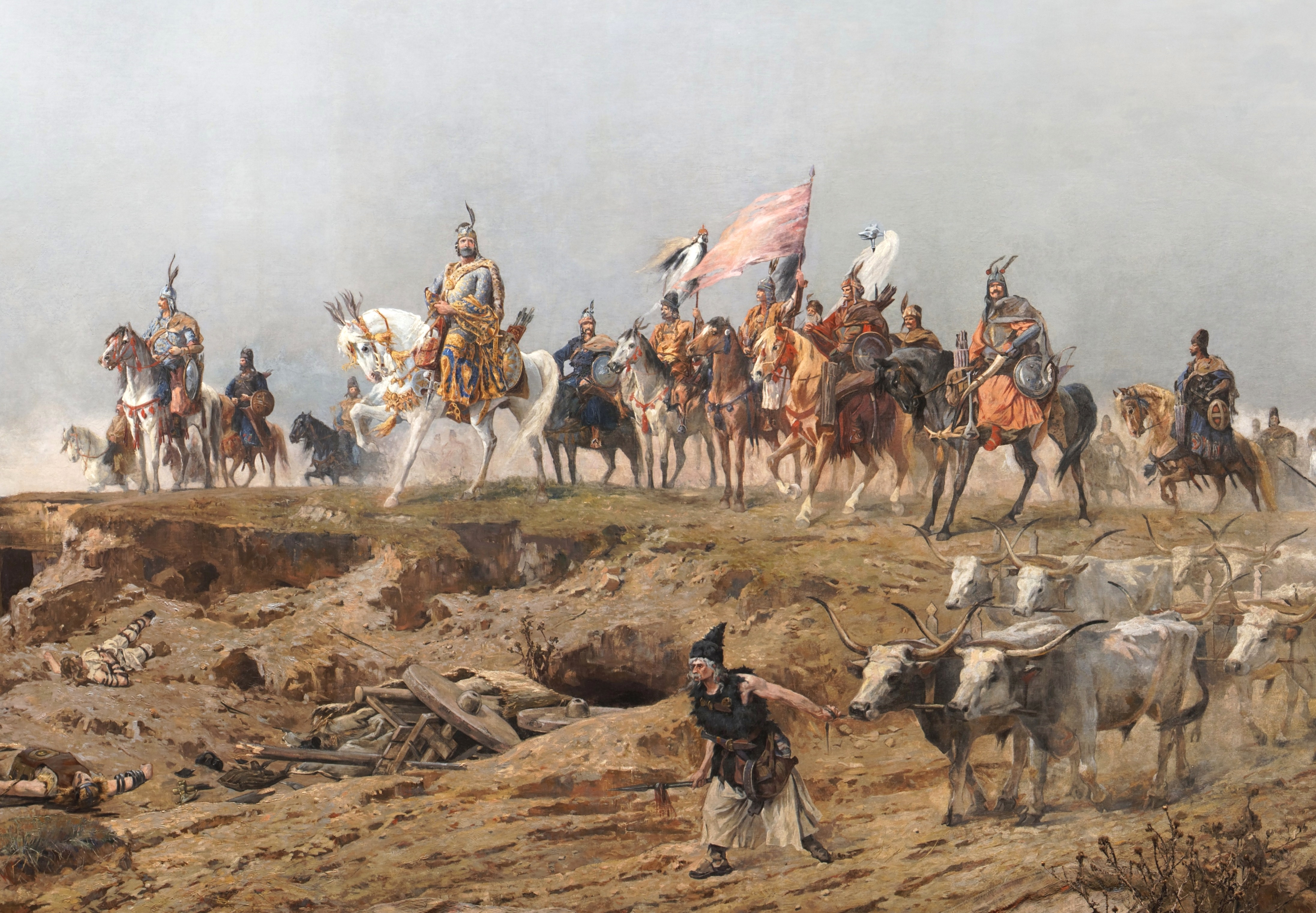
A detail of the Arrival of the Hungarians, Árpád Feszty's and his assistants' vast (1800 m^{2}) cyclorama, painted to celebrate the 1000th anniversary of the Magyar conquest of Hungary, now displayed at the Ópusztaszer National Heritage Park in Hungary

He studied at the Academy of Fine Arts, Munich, from 1874, and later (1880–81) in Vienna. After returning home to Hungary, he was made famous by his two works entitled Golgota ("Calvary") and Bányaszerencsétlenség ("Accident in a Quarry"). He painted his well-known monumental picture, the Arrival of the Hungarians, depicting the Magyar conquest of Hungary in 896, for the 1000th anniversary of the Conquest, with the help of many others, including Jenő Barcsay, Dániel Mihalik and László Mednyánszky. It was seriously damaged during World War II (the painting, a cyclorama with a circumference of almost 120 metres and 15 metres tall, and thus some 1800 m^{2} in area, was cut up into 8-metre-long pieces, which were rolled up and stored in various museum warehouses). It wasn't until 1995 that it was restored and exhibited at the Ópusztaszer National Heritage Park in Hungary.

He lived in Florence from 1899 to 1902. After returning home, he painted smaller pictures and increasingly suffered from financial difficulties.

His art combined academic and naturalist tendencies. Several of his works are in the possession of the Hungarian National Gallery, Budapest.

His brothers Adolf and Gyula Feszty were both known architects; his daughter Masa (Mária) Feszty also became a painter of mainly landscapes, portraits and religious scenes. Among others, her portrait of the Hungarian sculptor Ede Kallós is owned by the Hungarian National Gallery.
