= Arrival of the Hungarians =

Panoramic painting by Árpád Feszty

Arrival of the Hungarians (Feszty Panorama)
- A magyarok bejövetele (Feszty-körkép) (Hungarian)
- Artist: Árpád Feszty et al.
- Year: 1892–94
- Type: Oil on canvas, cyclorama
- Dimensions: 15 m × 120 m (49 ft × 390 ft)
- Location: Ópusztaszer National Heritage Park, Ópusztaszer, Hungary

The Arrival of the Hungarians (Hungarian: A magyarok bejövetele; commonly known as Feszty Panorama or Feszty Cyclorama, Hungarian: Feszty-körkép) is a large cyclorama – a circular panoramic painting – by Hungarian painter Árpád Feszty and his assistants, depicting the beginning of the Hungarian conquest of the Carpathian Basin in 895.

It was completed in 1894 for the 1000th anniversary of the event. Since the 1100th anniversary of the event in 1995, the painting has been displayed in the Ópusztaszer National Heritage Park, Hungary.

== The cyclorama ==
The 1760 m² cyclorama depicts approximately 2,000 persons.

The painting is nearly 15 meters (50 feet) tall and almost 120 meters (400 feet) in length.

== History ==
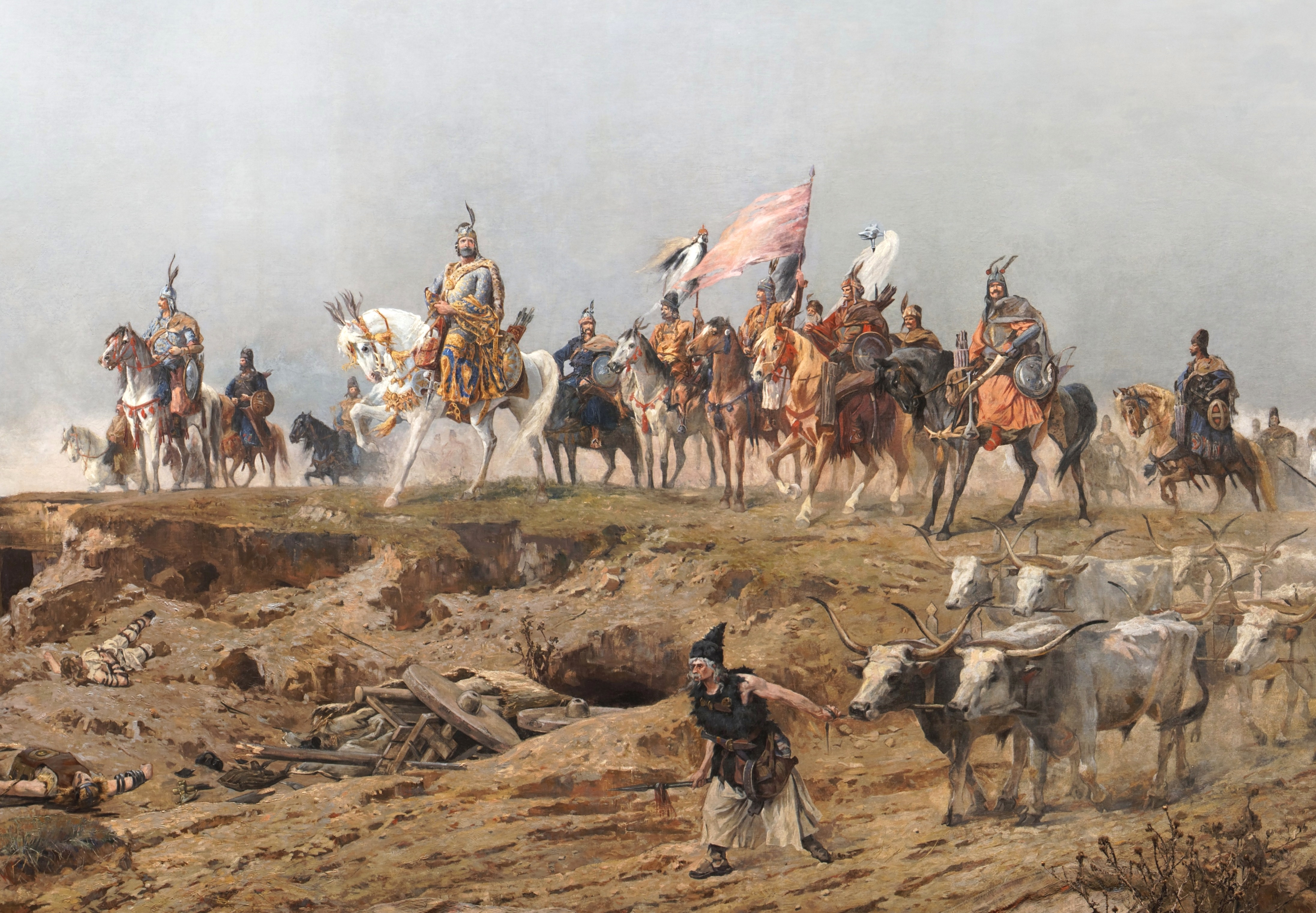
The seven chieftains of the Hungarians, a detail of the cyclorama

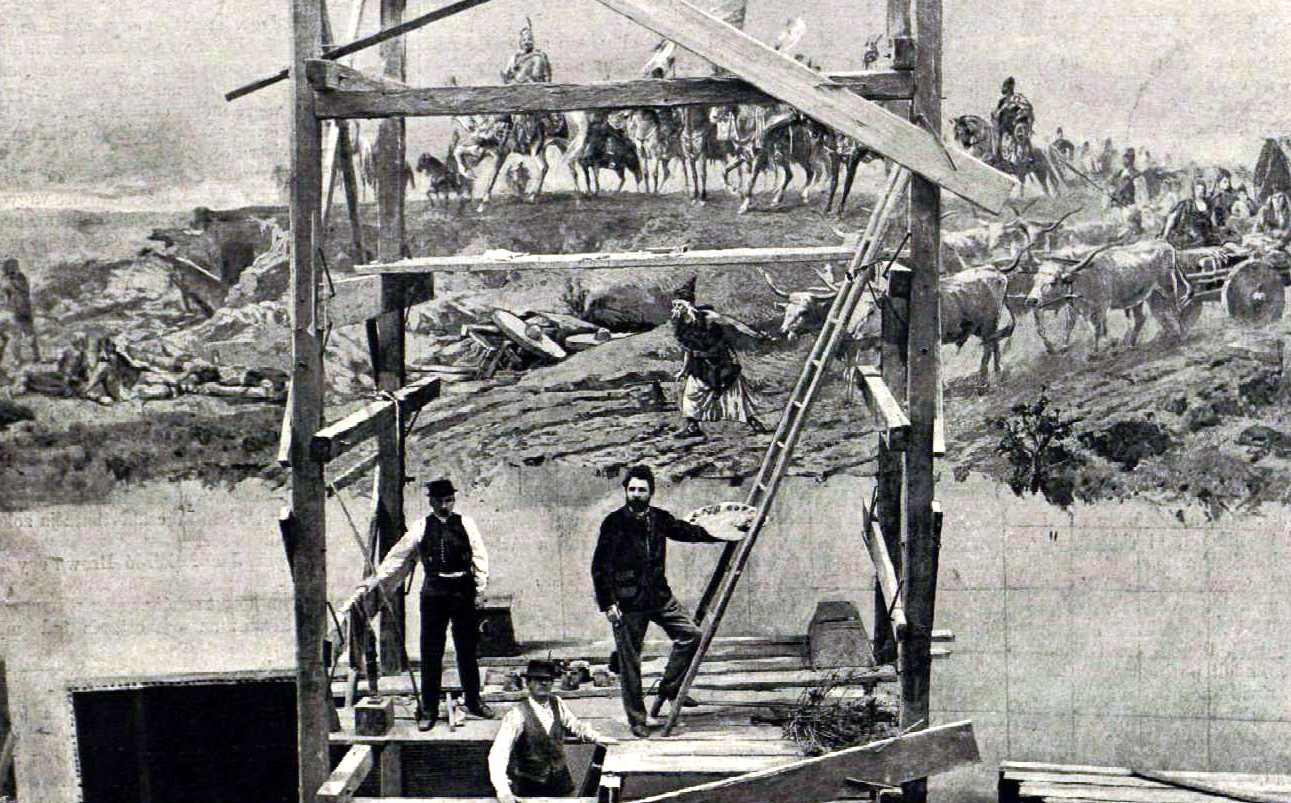
Feszty and his assistants at work

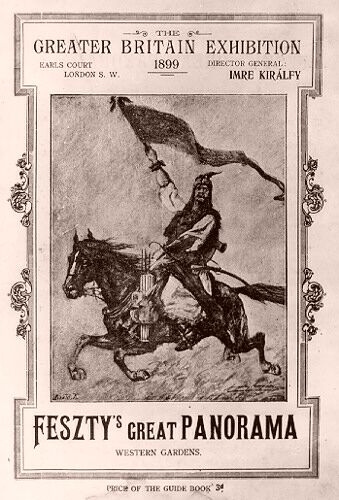
Feszty's Panorama was displayed at the Greater Britain Exhibition (World's Fair) of 1899

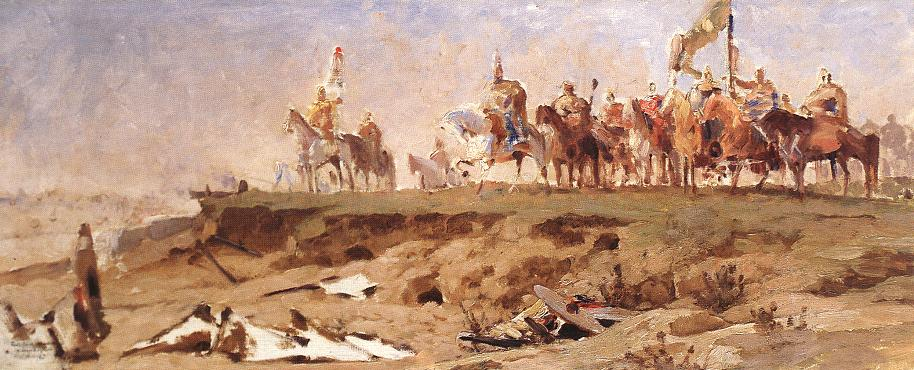
The first sketch by Feszty, from 1891

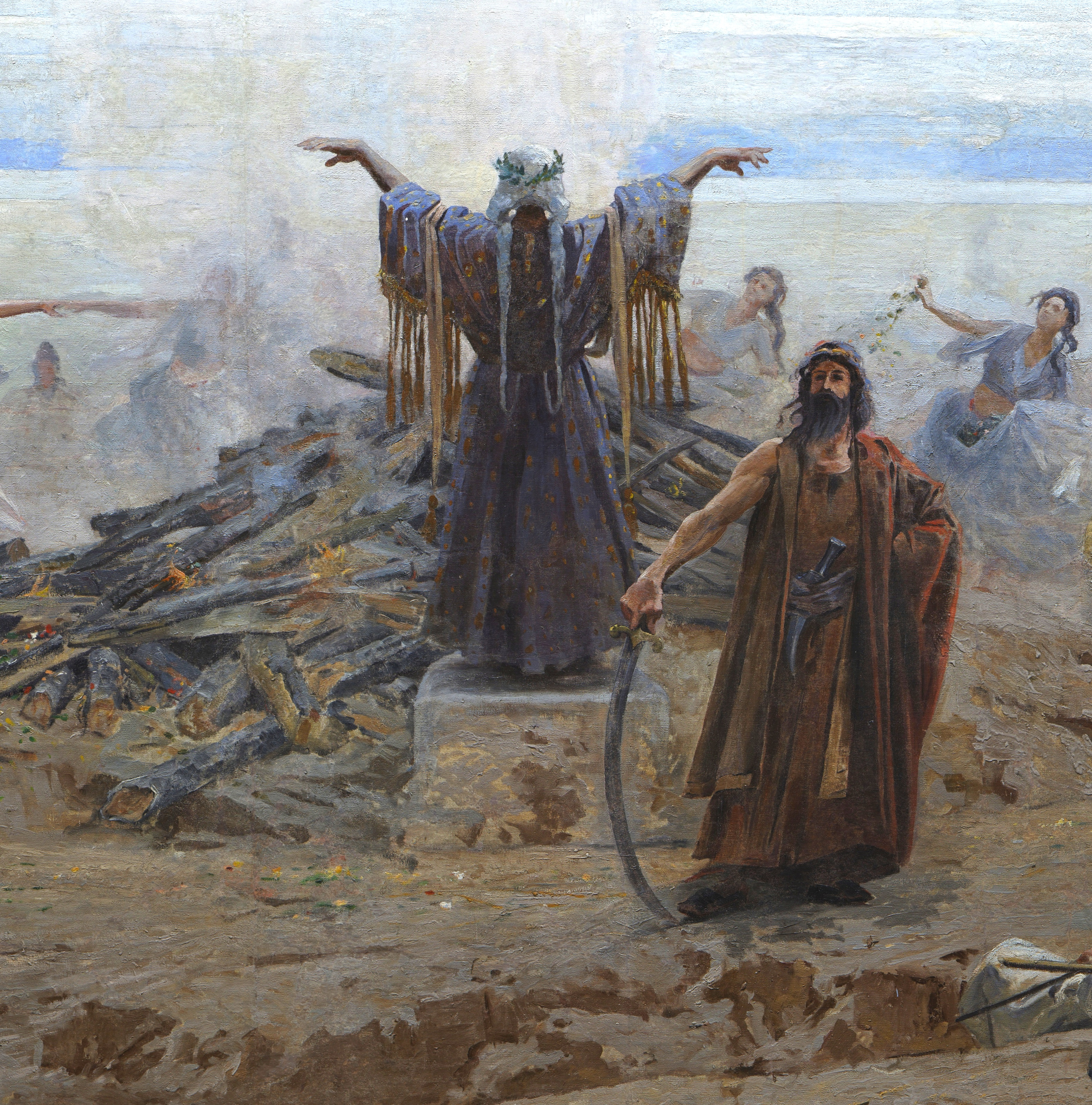
A Hungarian táltos on the painting, a figure from Hungarian mythology

In 1891, Árpád Feszty saw a panoramic painting by Detaille and Neuville in Paris. At first, his idea was to paint the biblical flood in a similar manner, but on advice of his father-in-law, the famous Hungarian writer Mór Jókai, he changed his mind and painted the Arrival of the Hungarians instead.

In order to create an authentic representation of the landscape, Feszty visited the Verecke Pass of the Carpathians near Munkács, where the Hungarians entered the Basin in 895. The approximate location of the viewpoint of the cyclorama is 48°26′53″N 22°42′1″E. (Note: Panoramio photo of the corresponding landscape)

The Hungarian press constantly reported on the progress of the work. They predicted that the painting would be completed by August 20, 1893 (August 20 is the national day of Hungary, commemorating the canonization of King Saint Stephen of Hungary on August 20, 1083). Seeing the public's interest, the council of Budapest paid the costs. In the contract they named a Budapest location for the painting. Feszty was unable to finish in time for the August 20 holiday; as of August, only a small color draft was ready (the final painting is enormous, at 15×120 meters). In April, with the aid of Ignác Újváry, he painted the sky. Landscape details were painted by László Mednyánszky, Újváry and Spányi. The people were painted by Pál Vágó and Henrik Papp, and the camps by Celesztin Pállya. More painters joined the work, as it was too much for Feszty and his companions to finish without help. Several writer, actor and musician friends entertained the painters as they worked.

On the spring of 1894, Feszty did the finishing touches, bringing the painting into overall harmony. After the work had been done, Feszty blamed himself for not finishing it by the deadline, and he ultimately lost 10,000 florins after paying the bills.

First building of the cyclorama

The day of the opening was May 13, 1894. Huge crowds wanted to see the painting, the biggest attraction of the millennial exhibition in Hungary, commemorating the 1000th anniversary of the conquest. Today, most historians accept 895 as the year of the conquest; however, the millennial celebrations were held in 1896.

The canvas was later transported to London for the 1899 Greater Britain Exhibition. It was brought back to Budapest in 1909. The second exhibition of the painting opened on May 30, 1909. After that, restorations had to be done.

In the siege of Budapest during World War II, the building and the canvas of the cyclorama suffered damages. Rain and snow fell on the painting. After the changes to Hungary's borders, the only savior of the painting, István Feszty, nephew of Árpád Feszty, found himself outside of the new borders of Hungary; and Masa Feszty daughter of Árpád Feszty had no opportunity to save it either.

== Rebirth ==
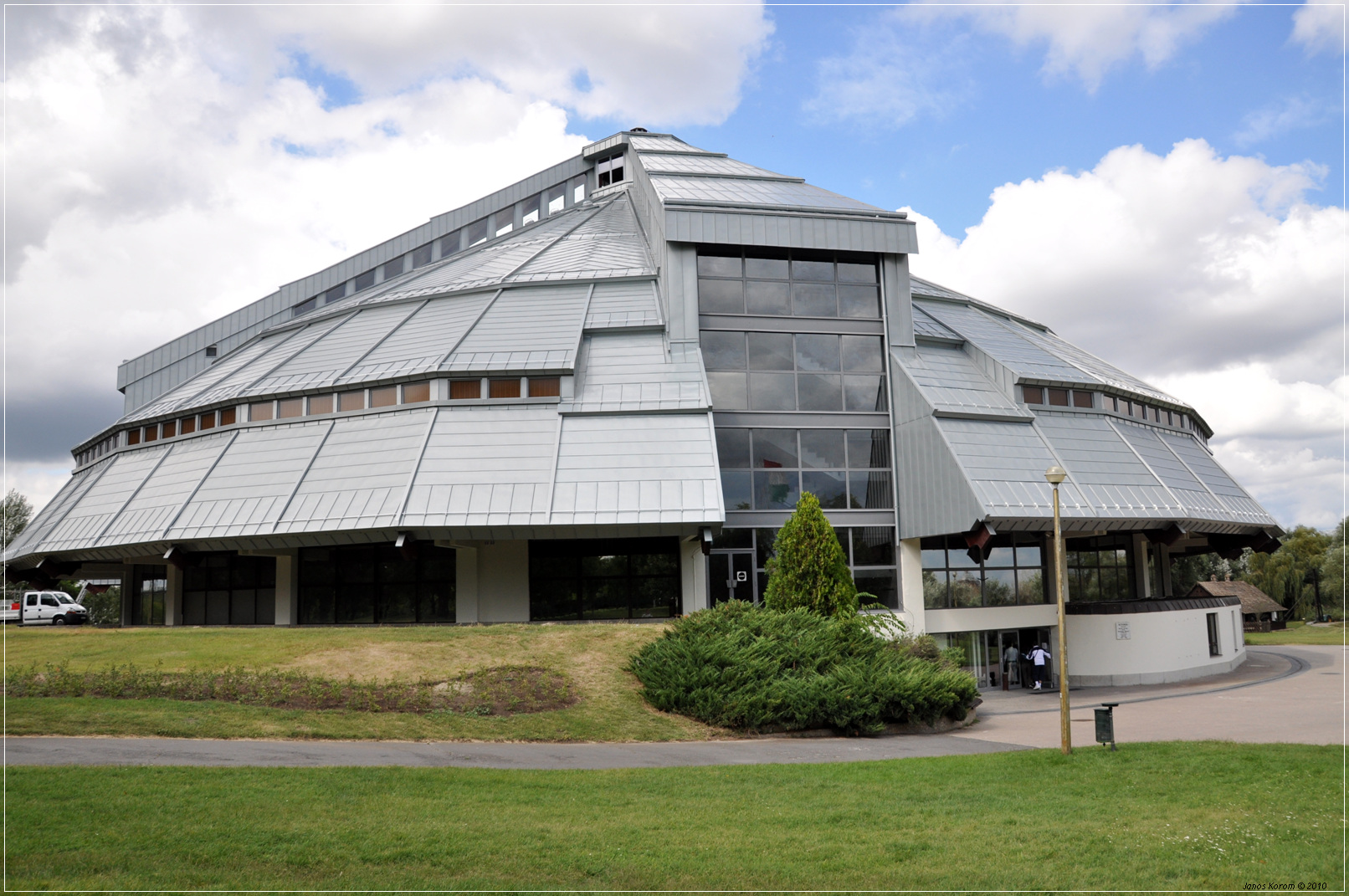
Rotunda in Ópusztaszer. The current location of the Feszty Panorama.

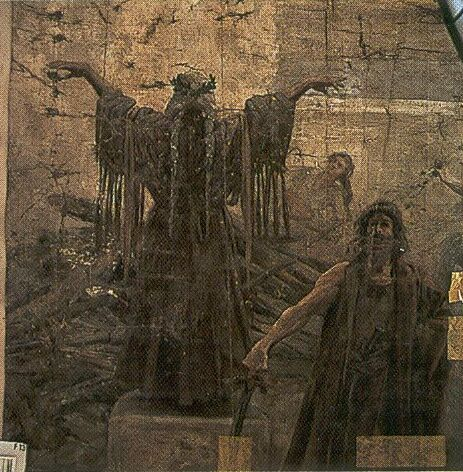
Detail of the painting before its restoration

In the 1970s, a decision was made to build a National Heritage Park in Ópusztaszer. Restoration of the painting and the construction of a new rotunda for the cyclorama began. The construction stopped in 1979, and parts of the canvas were again stored rolled up. In 1991, a Polish group of restorers won the contract for a new restoration. Since 1995 it has been on display again, together with artificial terrain and hidden speakers playing realistic sound effects. A great success, it is the main attraction of the heritage park of Ópusztaszer.
