= Stéphane Sergent =

French footballer (born 1973)

Personal information
- Date of birth: 8 June 1973 (age 53)
- Place of birth: Quimper, France
- Height: 1.81 m (5 ft 11 in)
- Position: Defender

Team information
- Current team: Plouhinec

Senior career*
| Years | Team | Apps | (Gls) |
| 1989–1991 | Guingamp | 0 | (0) |
| 1991–1995 | Quimper | ? | (?) |
| 1995–2001 | Brest | ? | (?) |
| 2001–2005 | Rouen | 117 | (8) |
| 2005–2006 | Bayonne | 35 | (1) |
| 2006–2008 | Quimper | ? | (?) |
| 2008– | Plouhinec | ? | (?) |
- * Club domestic league appearances and goals

Stéphane Sergent (born 8 June 1973) is a French footballer who currently plays as a defender for Plouhinec. He previously played professionally in Ligue 2 with Rouen.
