= Eidophusikon =

18th-century mechanical art piece

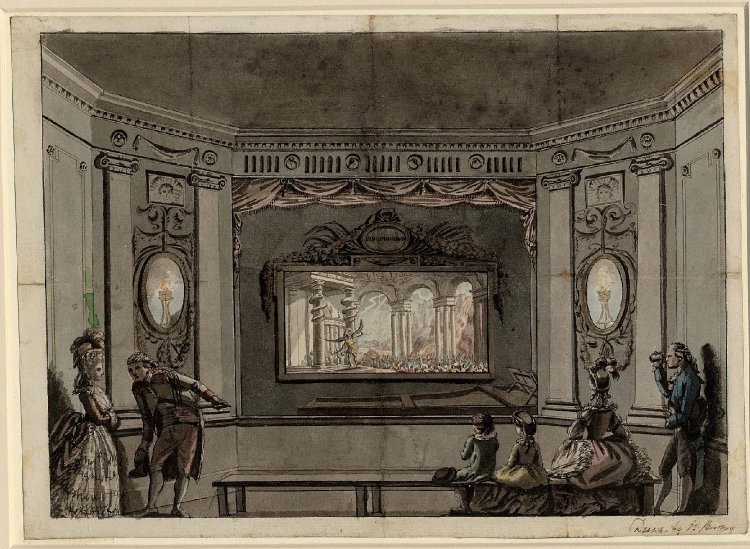
Viewing the Eidophusikon, circa 1782

The Eidophusikon (Greek: Ειδωφυσικον) was a piece of art, no longer extant, thought up by the English actor David Garrick and created by 18th-century French painter Philip James de Loutherbourg. It opened in Leicester Square in London in February 1781.

Described by the media of his day as "Moving Pictures, representing Phenomena of Nature", the Eidophusikon can be considered an early form of movie making. The effect was achieved by mirrors and pulleys.

The Eidophusikon consisted of a large-scale miniature theatre that tried to recreate the perfect illusion of living nature: sunrise scenes, sunsets, moonlight images, storms, and volcanoes from all over the world, with sound and music effects. The sound and light effects of the Eidophusikon, compared with the shows seen until that time, were especially inventive by virtue of their realism.

== Reconstructions ==
In 1973 John Ronayne ARCA designed and built a working reconstruction of the Eidophusikon for an exhibition of de Loutherbourg paintings at Kenwood House, London, now managed by English Heritage. It was built by Harry Lacock, the House craftsman, with Ronayne and colleagues at the Royal College of Art responsible for the modelmaking and electronic animation. It was set in motion manually (by House staff) and featured a moving cloudscape (painted linen, backlit, travelling between two large rollers), and the rising of the Palace of Pandemonium with an animated model of Satan haranguing his troops - as depicted in the Francis Burney watercolour. The whole performance took about 10 minutes, accompanied by harpsichord music by Thomas Arne and a spoken script base on Milton's Paradise Lost.

In 2004 a reconstruction was designed by Robert Poulter built by Wolkenbilder at the Altonaer Museum Exhibition (cloud images) at Jenisch Has, Hamburg. It was a full-sized theatre with two scenes on the basis of Loutherbourg: from dawn to sunset over the Royal Naval College in Greenwich, and a Mediterranean scene with a lighthouse, moonlight, storms and wrecks.

In 2005 another version also designed by Robert Poulter for the Yale Center for British Art, New Connecticut and California's Huntington Library, to recreate a display for the English painter Thomas Gainsborough of his collection 'Sensation and sensibility'. Gainsborough was a great admirer of the Eidophusikon. This full-size version was built in conjunction with Kevin Derkin and the Yale technical department under Rick Johnson. The scene, this time, was 'Satan and the Creation of the Pandemonium Palace in Hell', by the poet John Milton from his Paradise Lost.

A small exhibition on the Eidophusikon and the work of Philip James de Loutherbourg was held at the Huntington Library in San Marino, California in 2006. The exhibit featured a working example of an Eidophusikon with docents working the levers.

In 2006, an Eidophusikon was created by Robert Poulter for the Nouveau Musée National de Monaco. Another Mediterranean scene was created with a volcano, moonlight, a storm and a shipwreck. This Eidophusikon is part of the permanent collection of the museum.

A full Eidophusikon, described also as a "small, mechanical theatre", was on display from June to November 2014 at the exhibition "Underworlds" (Unterwelten) in Dortmund, Germany.

== See also ==
- Cyclorama
- Diorama
- Myriorama
- Panorama
- Panoramic painting
- Eidophusikon by author/comic artist Jack Masters
