= Cosmorama =

Exhibit of an all-encompassing panorama of a famous location

A cosmorama is an exhibition of perspective pictures of different places in the world, usually world landmarks. Careful use of illumination and lenses gives the images greater realism.

Cosmorama was also the name of an entertainment in 19th century London, at 207-209 Regent Street, at which the public could view scenes of distant lands and exotic subjects through optical devices that magnified the pictures. It was later converted into an exhibition of curiosities named the Prince of Wales Bazaar. Exhibits included a sea lion, a sea serpent and L. Bertolotto's Flea circus.

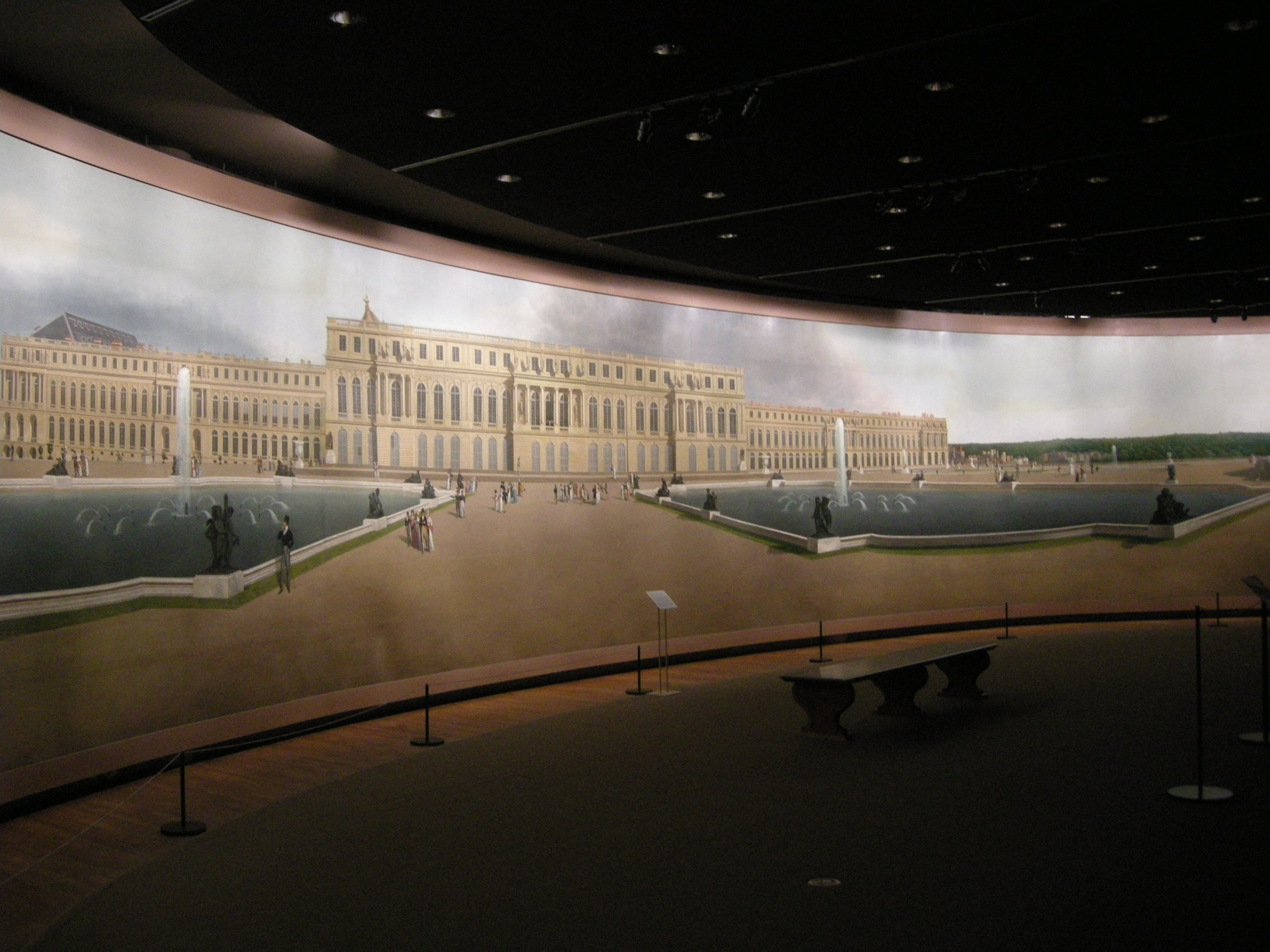
Cosmorama of Chateau Versailles (1819-1818), once in City Hall Park, New York City, now in the Metropolitan Museum of Art

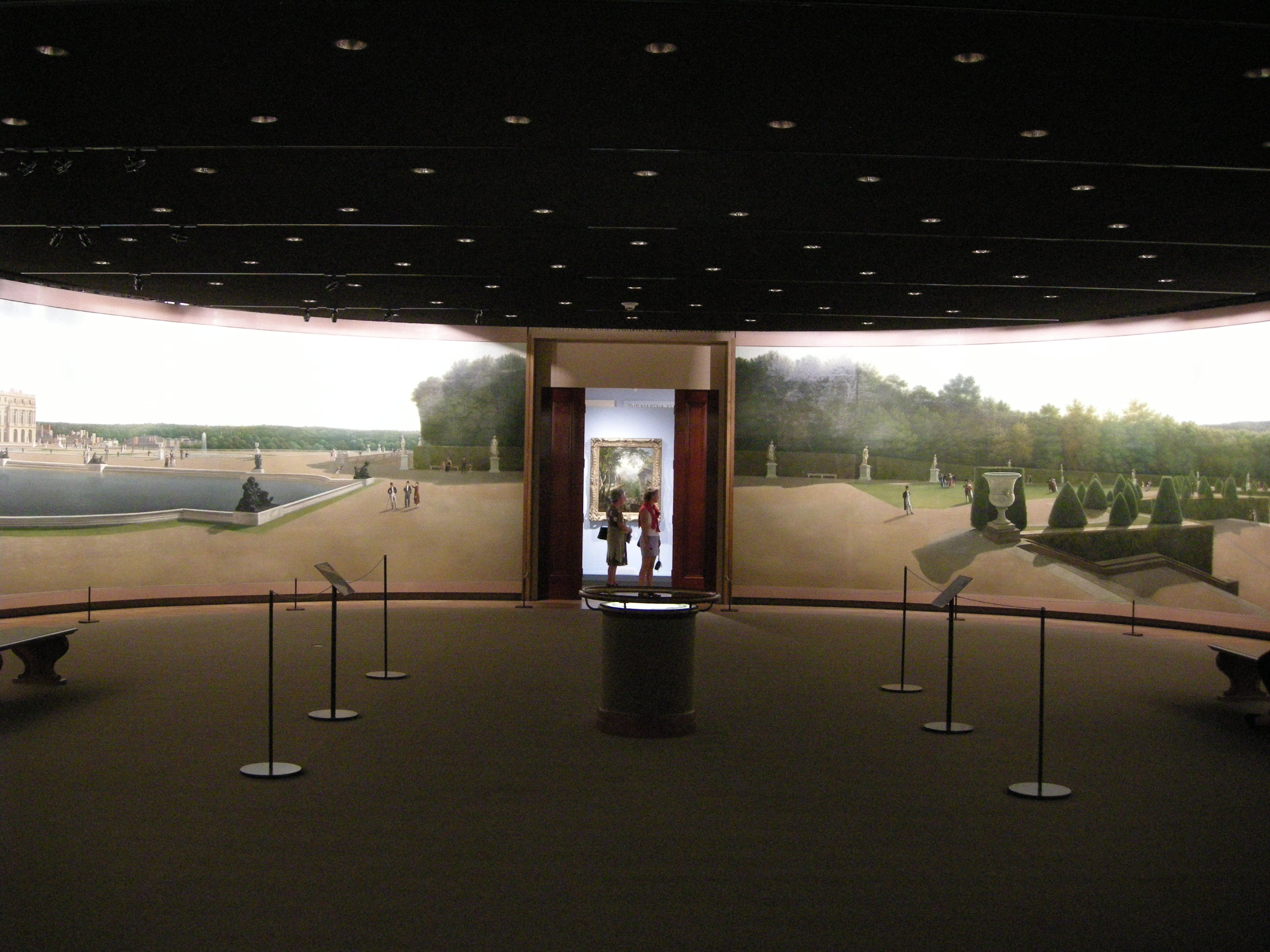
Cosmorama of Chateau Versailles (1819-1818), once in City Hall Park, New York City, now in the Metropolitan Museum of Art

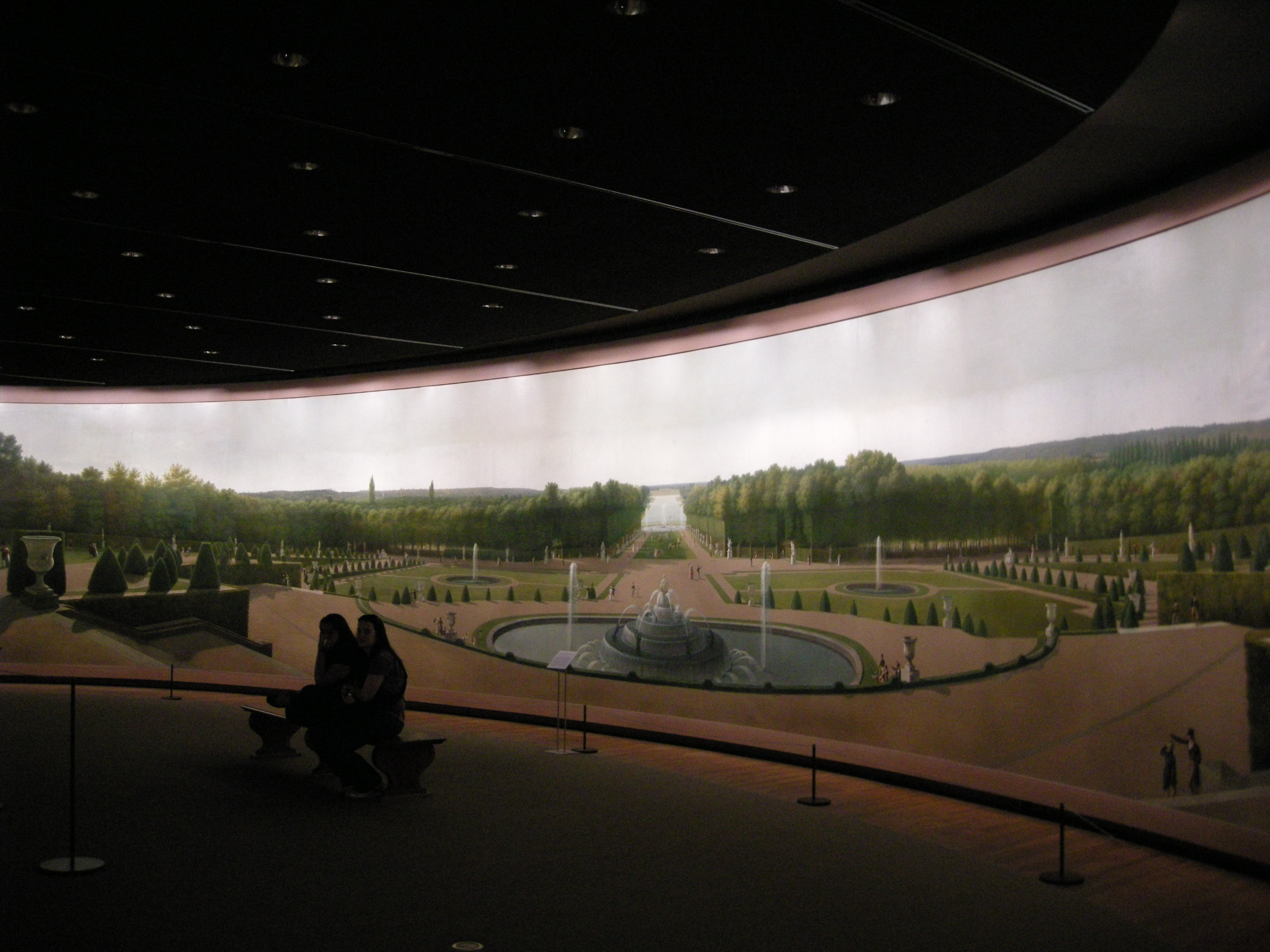
Cosmorama of Chateau Versailles (1819-1818), once in City Hall Park, New York City, now in the Metropolitan Museum of Art

== Port-au-Prince Cosmorama ==
Port-au-Prince Cosmorama was an exhibition of perspective pictures of different places and landmarks in the world, held on March 2, 1834, in Port-au-Prince, Haiti.

== See also ==
- Cyclorama
- Diorama
- Eidophusikon
- Myriorama
- Panorama
- Panoramic painting
- International Panorama Council
