= Ópusztaszer National Heritage Park =

Memorial park in Ópusztaszer, Hungary

Coordinates: 46°29′22.17″N 20°5′46.33″E

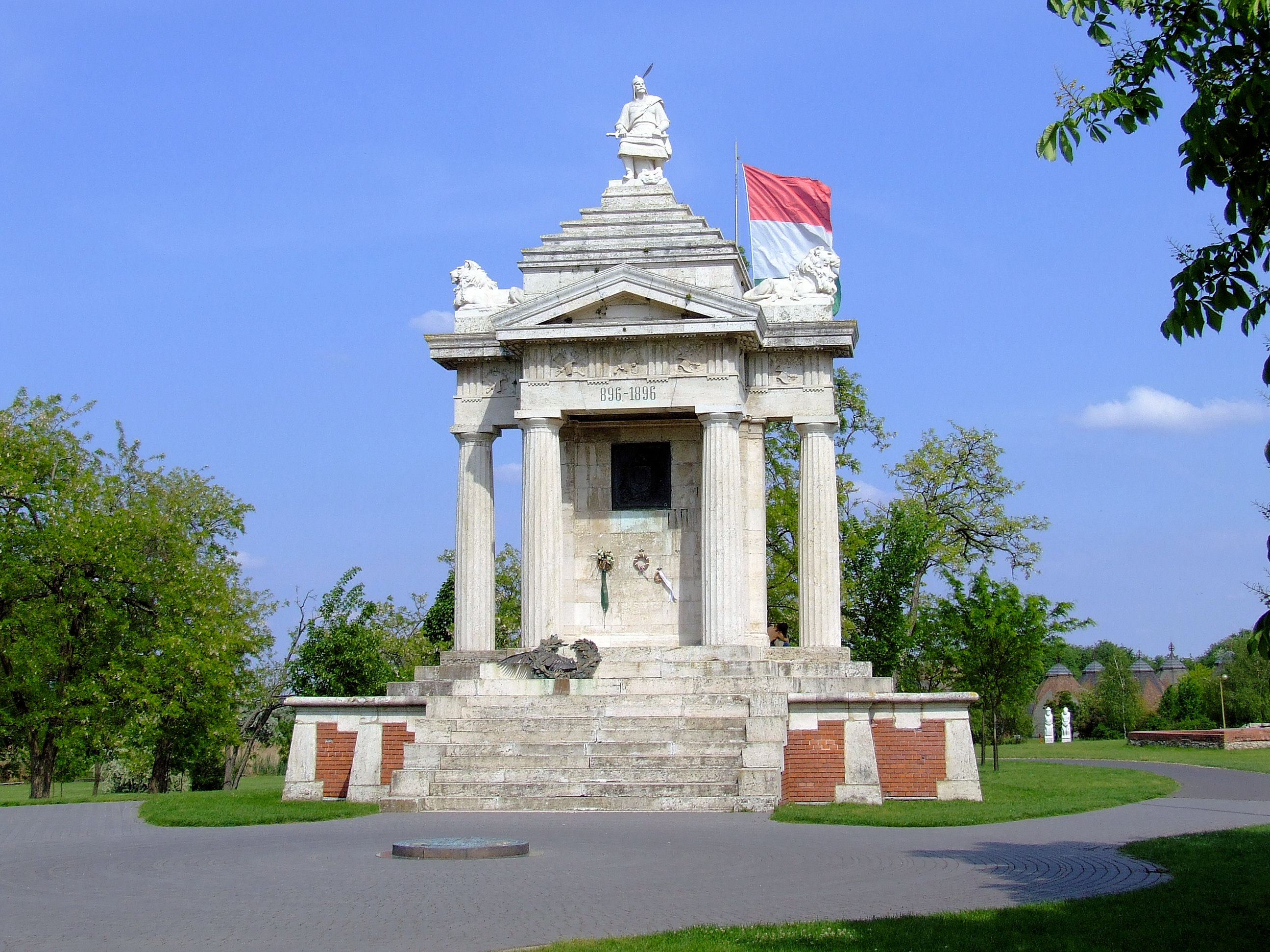
Monument of Hungarian Grand Prince Árpád

The Ópusztaszer National Heritage Park is an open-air museum of Hungarian history in Ópusztaszer, Hungary. It was established in 1982 and is most famous for being the location of the Feszty Panorama, a cyclorama by Árpád Feszty and his assistants, depicting the beginning of the Hungarian conquest of the Carpathian Basin in 895. The painting was completed in 1894 for the 1000th anniversary of the event. The park is also home to various indoor and outdoor exhibits, focusing on the archaeological and ethnographic history of ancient and early-modern Hungary in an immersive and engaging manner.

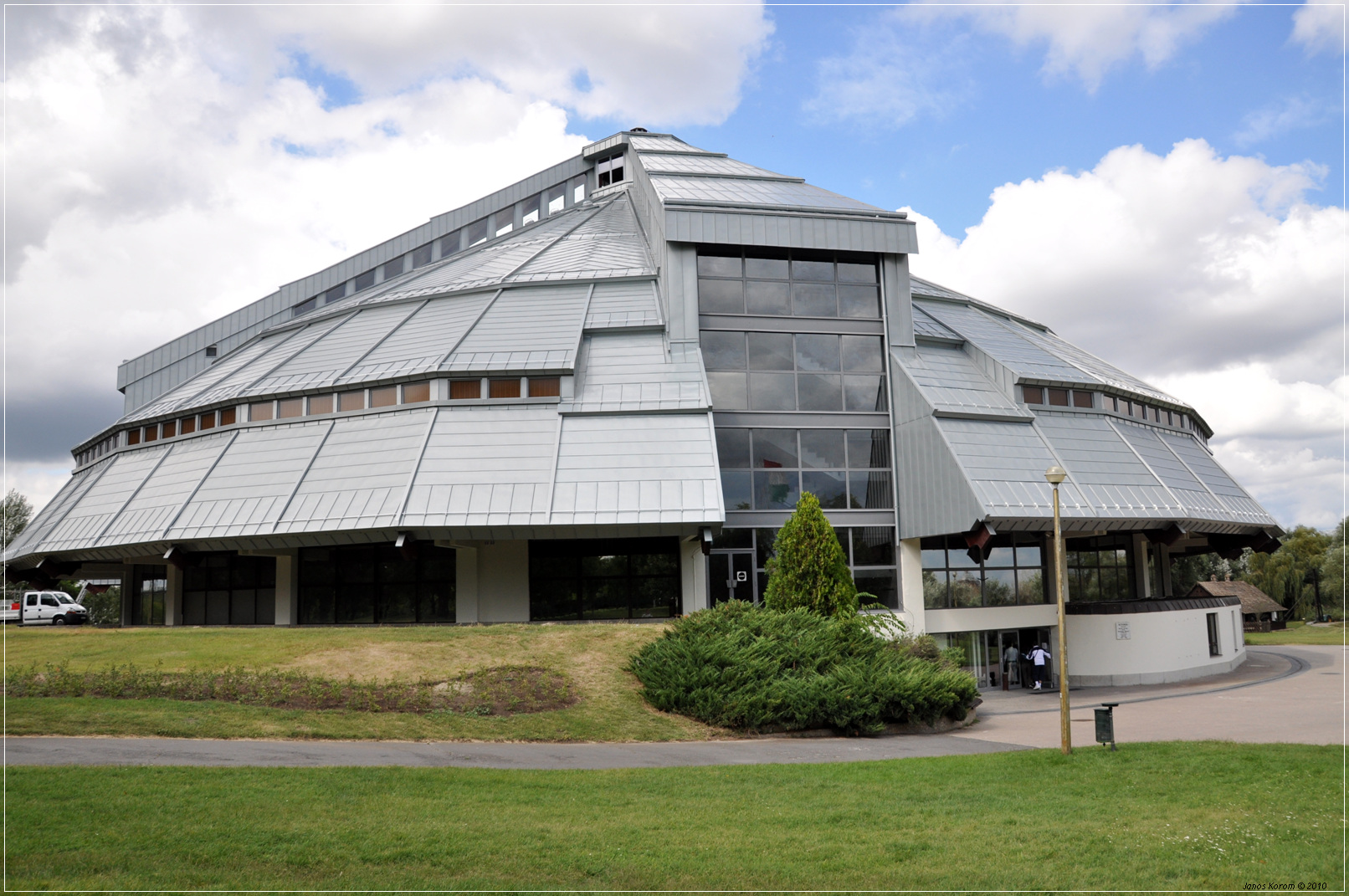
Rotunda in Ópusztaszer; the location of the Feszty Panorama

In the 1970s, a decision was made to build a heritage park in Csongrád County. Restoration of the Arrival of the Hungarians painting and the construction of a new rotunda for the famous cyclorama began. Construction stopped in 1979 and parts of the canvas were again rolled up, and stored away. In 1991, a group of Polish art conservationists won the contract for a new restoration. Since 1995 the cyclorama has been on permanent display, together with artificial terrain and hidden speakers playing sound effects. It is the main attraction of the Ópusztaszer national heritage park.

== The Rotunda ==
The Rotunda houses the famous Feszty Panorama, the Arrival of the Hungarians, which was originally completed on May 13, 1894. The cyclorama measures 15 meters tall and 120 meters long, forming a panorama painting with a 38-meter diameter. It is one of only 16 cycloramas in existence worldwide, making the painting an exceptionally rare work of art. The painting depicts the beginning of the Hungarian Conquest of the Carpathian Basin, commemorating the event which took place over 1000 years prior to painting's first exhibition in 1894. The cyclorama depicts various scenes from this initial conquest, including the arrival of the Seven Chieftains of the Magyars, and the sacrifice of a white horse by the pagan high priest, called a Táltos. The cyclorama was painted by Árpád Feszty from 1892 to 1894, with the help of many assistants and fellow artists. Notably, the landscape was painted in large part by László Mednyánszky, and equestrian battle scenes were painted with the help of Pál Vágó.

The Rotunda contains many other permanent exhibitions, including the following:

- Panoramas of the World: A display of 34 nineteenth century panoramas, from the golden age of panoramic photography.
- Panoptics: Wax figures of 22 notable Hungarian historical figures.
- The Promenade: An exhibition of small town and big city life in the nineteenth century, and the golden age of the Austro-Hungarian Monarchy.
- History of the Park: An introduction to the park's history.
- The Monastery of Szer: A look at life in the Szer monastery which formerly stood where the park currently does, through the lens of artifacts and archaeological remains.
- Family of Peoples: An ethnographic display, looking at the Finno-Ugric peoples as a whole.

In 2013, the remains of a 15 x 120 meter cyclorama painted in 1898 was put on display in the Rotunda. The cyclorama, entitled Transylvanian Panorama depicts the Battle of Nagyszeben, during the Hungarian Revolution of 1848-49.

== Outdoor exhibitions ==
=== Open Air Ethnographic Collection ===
The Ópusztaszer open air ethnographic collection is one of Hungary's village museums. The village has been open since its conception in 1978, and it is home to 19 historical buildings and 3 open air exhibits. The collection of historical buildings introduces the visitor to Hungary's wide range of landscapes and architectural styles. The village also houses a collection of vehicles and agricultural equipment.

=== "Forest and Man" Collection ===
The "Forest and Man" collection is found in a pine pavilion reminiscent of a yurt. The collection explores the relationship between humans, forests, and trees.

=== Nomad Park ===
The "Nomad Park" recreates the world of the Eurasian steppes, complete with yurts and interactive displays. The park includes a live horse show which features horses and riders in early Magyar costume, and playing hunting games that were popular with the Early Magyar peoples.

=== Ruins ===
This area presents the uncovered ruins of the monastery of Szer, which was unearthed in 1970.
