= Mesdag Collection =

Art museum in the Netherlands

Coordinates: 52.08608°N 4.29772°E

The Mesdag Collection
- De Mesdag Collectie
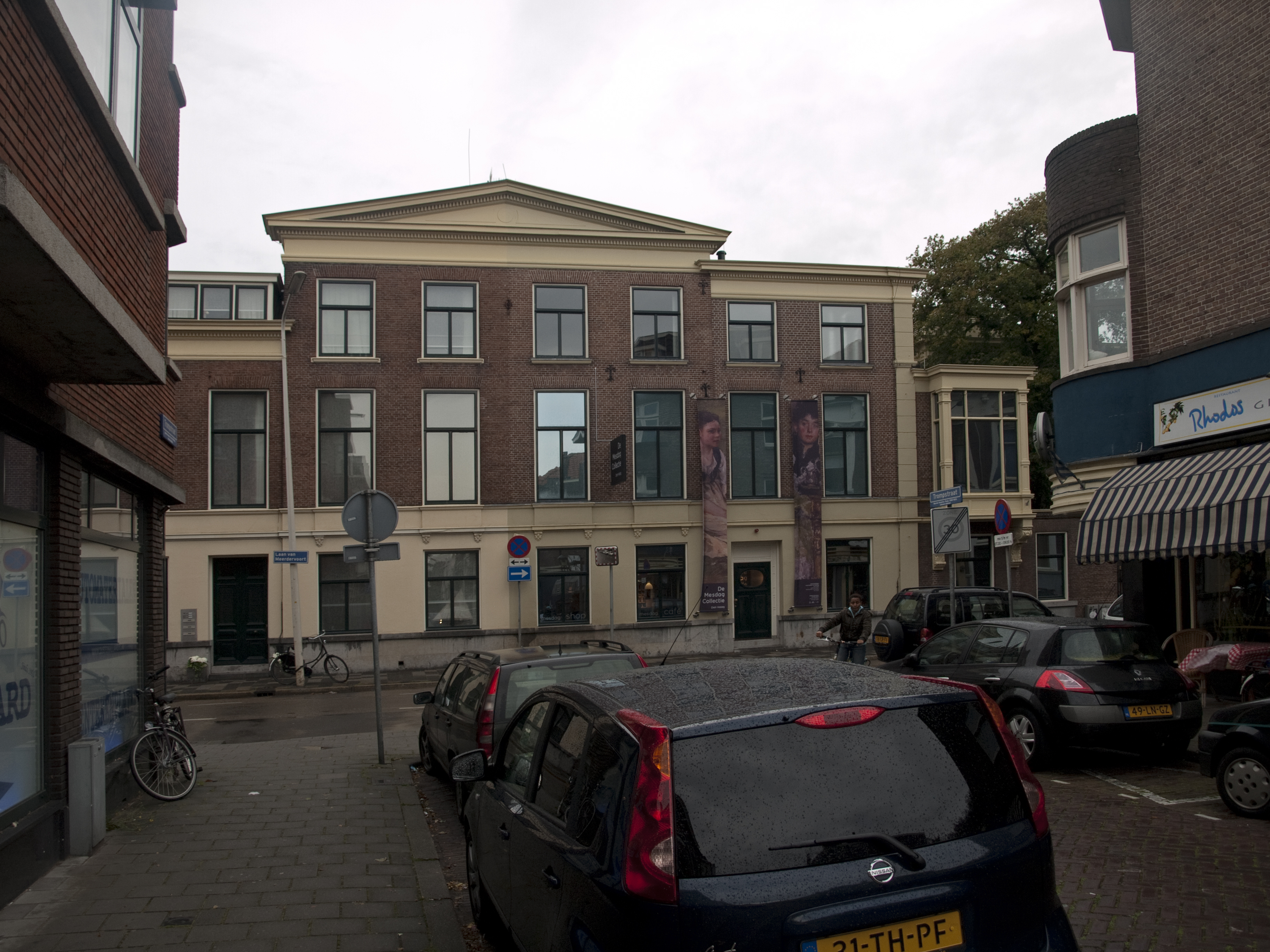
- Former name: Museum Mesdag
- Location: The Hague, Netherlands
- Type: Art museum
- Website: www.demesdagcollectie.nl/en

The Mesdag Collection is an art museum in The Hague, Netherlands. It is managed by the Van Gogh Museum.

The museum is housed next to the former house of the Dutch painter Hendrik Willem Mesdag and shows the art Mesdag and his wife Sina van Houten collected from 1866 to 1903. It features work of the painters of the Hague School like Willem Roelofs and Anton Mauve and work of the French Barbizon School (Jean-Baptiste Camille Corot, Théodore Rousseau, Jean-François Millet, Charles-François Daubigny and Eugène Delacroix and paintings of Lawrence Alma-Tadema. There is also a large collection of Japanese art and Japanese craftwork (pottery) on show. This all is shown in a typical 19th-century setting.

The museum was closed for renovation for roughtly two years until Spring 2011. On 14 May 2011 it was re-opened and renamed from "Museum Mesdag" to "The Mesdag Collection".

The Panorama Mesdag is housed in different premises within walking distance from The Mesdag Collection.

== History ==
In 1887, Hendrik Willem Mesdag and Sina Van Houten finished construction on a building next to their house to serve as a museum for their art collection. In 1903, Hendrik Mesdag donated the museum to the Netherlands. After Henrik Mesdag's death in 1915, parts of his private collection were sold.

In 1990, the museum came under the management of the Van Gogh Museum. From 2011 to 2015, the Van Gogh Museum and the Netherlands Institute for Art History researched and digitized the Mesdags' original art collection, the current Mesdag collection, and Henrik Mesdag's letters.

== Visitor Numbers ==
In 2023, the Mesdag Collections received 9,389 visitors.

== See also ==
- Panorama Mesdag
