= Panorama Mesdag =

Painting by Hendrik Willem Mesdag

Coordinates: 52°5′6″N 4°18′16″E

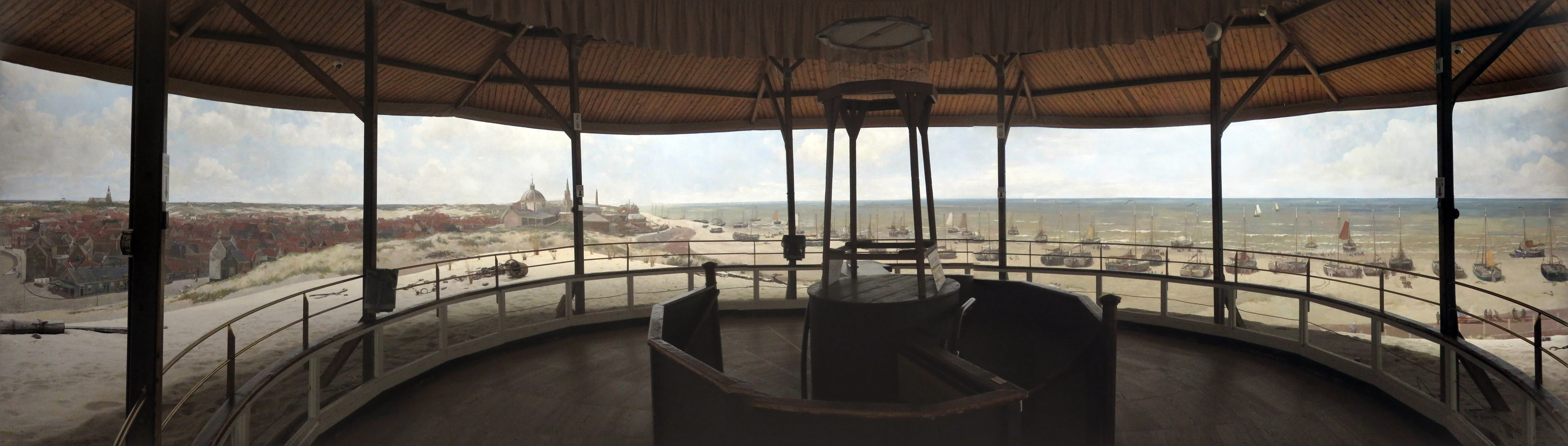
Panorama Mesdag seen from the observation gallery

Panorama of Scheveningen (Dutch: Panorama van Scheveningen), commonly known as Panorama Mesdag, is a panorama by Hendrik Willem Mesdag. Housed in a purpose-built museum in The Hague, the panorama is a cylindrical painting (also known as a cyclorama) more than 14 metres high and about 40 metres in diameter (120 metres in circumference). From an observation gallery in the centre of the room the cylindrical perspective creates the illusion that the viewer is on a high sand dune overlooking the sea, beaches and village of Scheveningen in the late 19th century. A foreground of fake terrain around the viewing gallery hides the base of the painting and makes the illusion more convincing.

== History ==
Mesdag was a marine painter of the Hague School; in 1880 he was engaged by a Belgian company to paint the panorama, which with the assistance of his wife Sientje Mesdag-van Houten and some student painters (including George Hendrik Breitner), was completed by 1881. However, the vogue for panoramas was coming to an end, and the company went bankrupt in 1886. Mesdag purchased the panorama and met its losses from his own pocket. The panorama is now the oldest surviving panorama in its original location.

== Gallery ==
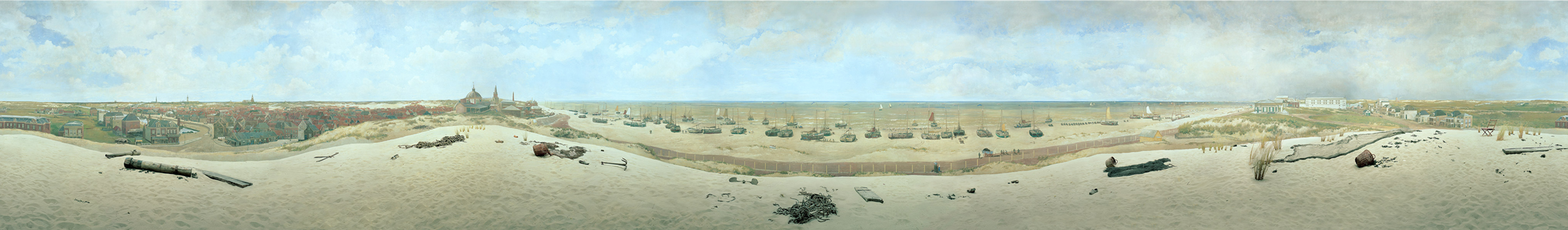

== See also ==
- Panoramic painting
- International Panorama Council
- Museum Mesdag
- Trompe-l'œil
