= Noordelijk Scheepvaartmuseum =

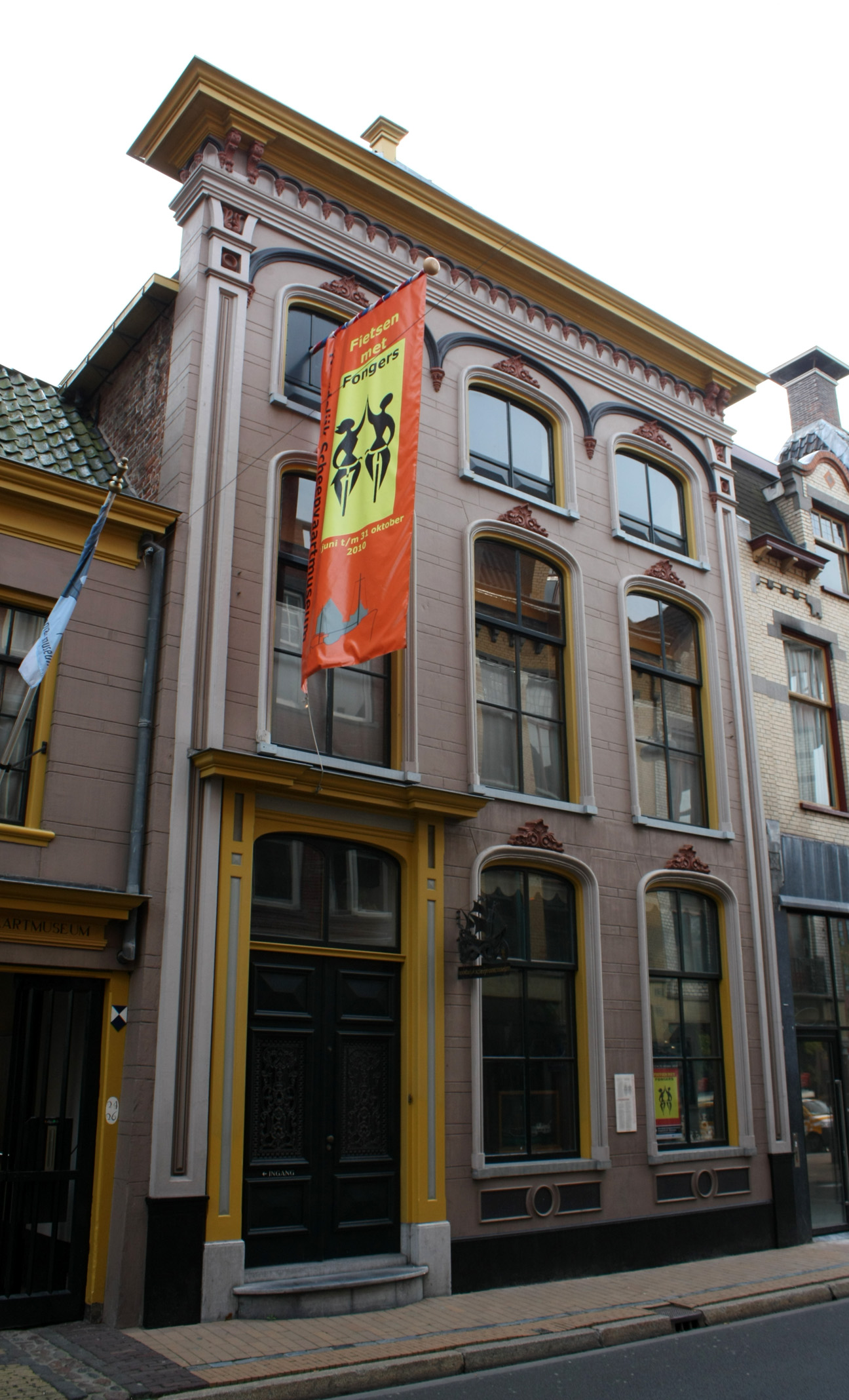
- Museum in 2010

- Location in Groningen in the Netherlands
- Established: 31 March 1932
- Location: Brugstraat 24–26; Groningen, Netherlands
- Coordinates: 53°12′59″N 6°33′36″E
- Type: Maritime museum
- Visitors: 38,757 (2017)
- Director: Jan Wiebe van Veen
- President: Pieter Westra
- Curator: Wicher Kerkmeijer
- Website: noordelijkscheepvaartmuseum.nl

Noordelijk Scheepvaartmuseum (Dutch pronunciation: [ˈnoːrdələk ˈsxeːpfaːrtmyˌzeːjʏm]; Northern Maritime Museum) is a maritime museum in Groningen in the Netherlands.

The museum was opened on 31 March 1932. With 34,098 visitors in 2015, it is one of the most-visited museums in the province of Groningen. The museum had 38,757 visitors in 2017.

Jan Wiebe van Veen is the director of the museum and Wicher Kerkmeijer the curator.
