= Panorama 1453 History Museum =

Istanbul museum

Coordinates: 41.01818°N 28.92053°E

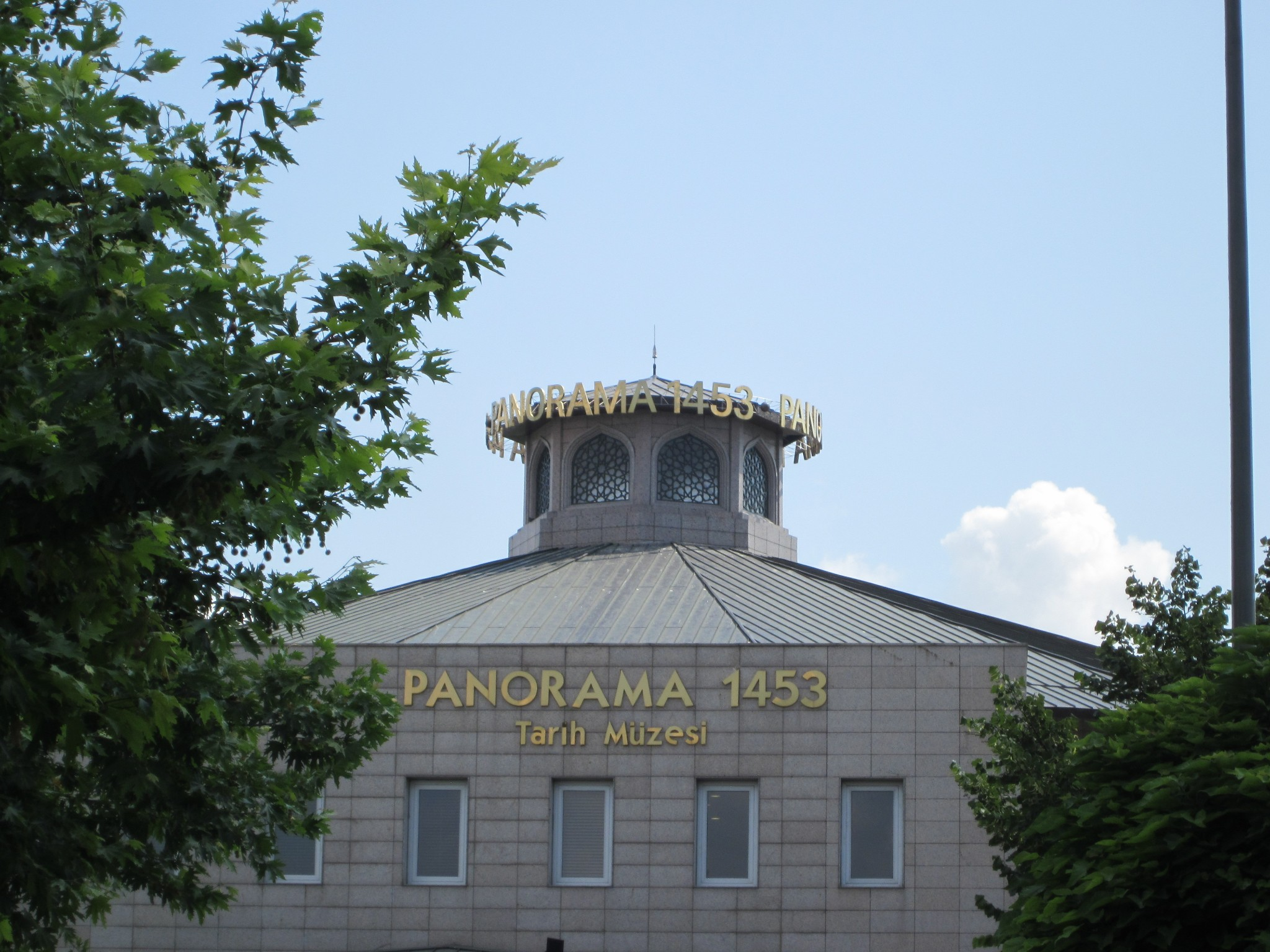
Panorama 1453 History Museum

The Panorama 1453 Historical Museum is a historical museum in Istanbul that opened on 31 January 2009.

This museum shows the conquering of the city of Constantinople, capital of the Byzantine Empire, by the troops of the Ottoman Sultan Mehmed the Conqueror on 29 May 1453. The museum is located close to the point where the Ottomans breached the walls. Its main exhibit is a 360° "panorama" painting, (also known as a Cyclorama) of the battlefield at the time the walls were breached, giving the visitor the impression they are standing in the middle of the battle. The painting is made and presented in such a way that the visitor appears to be at the centre of a huge space rather than a circle only 38m in diameter. Sound effects add to the illusion - there is the sound of guns firing, of soldiers shouting and a military band playing to urge on the troops.

== Practical information ==
The museum is located at the Topkapı station on the T1 and T4 Tram lines.

== Design and Construction of the Museum ==
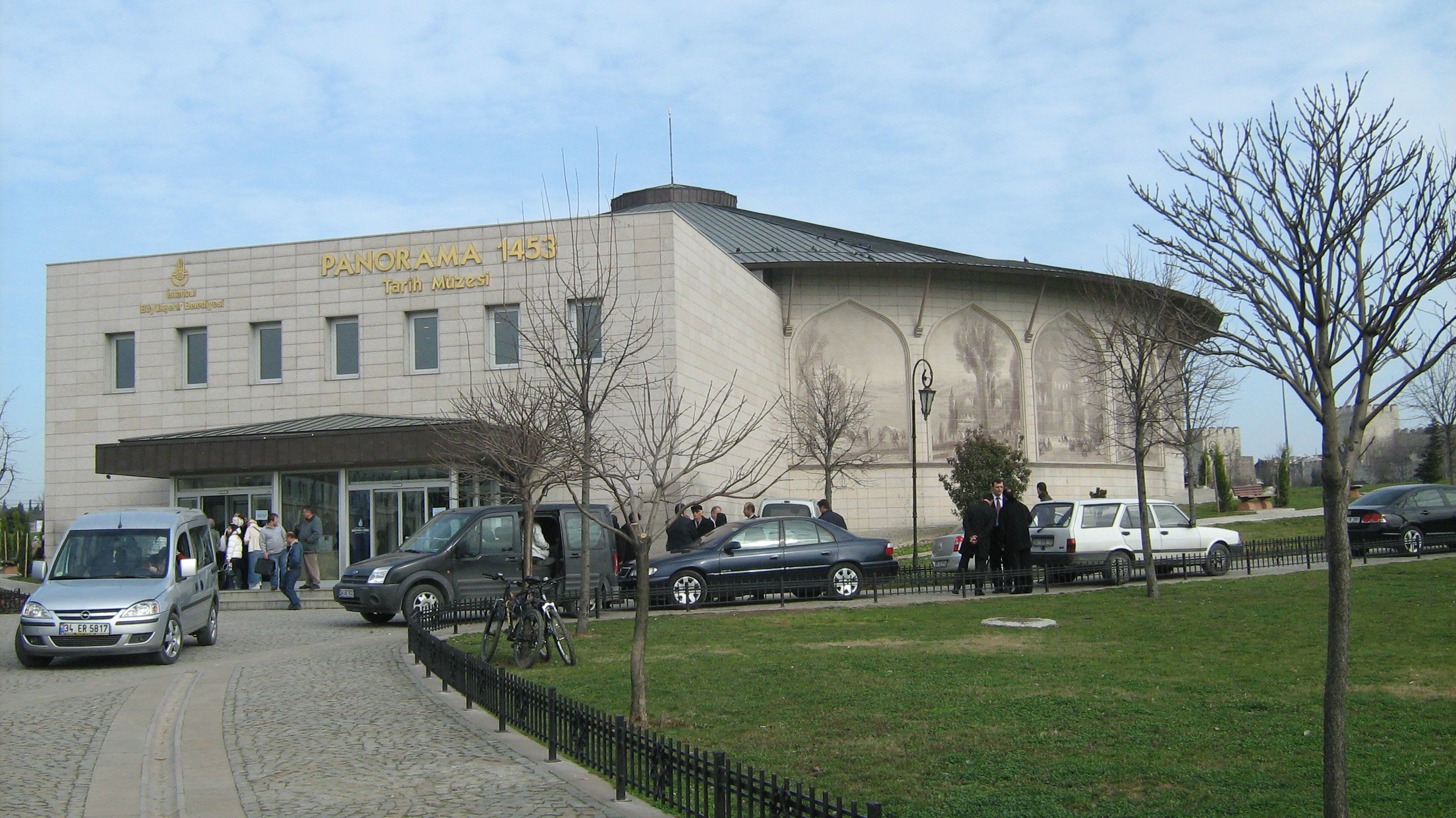
Panorama 1453 History Museum (front view).

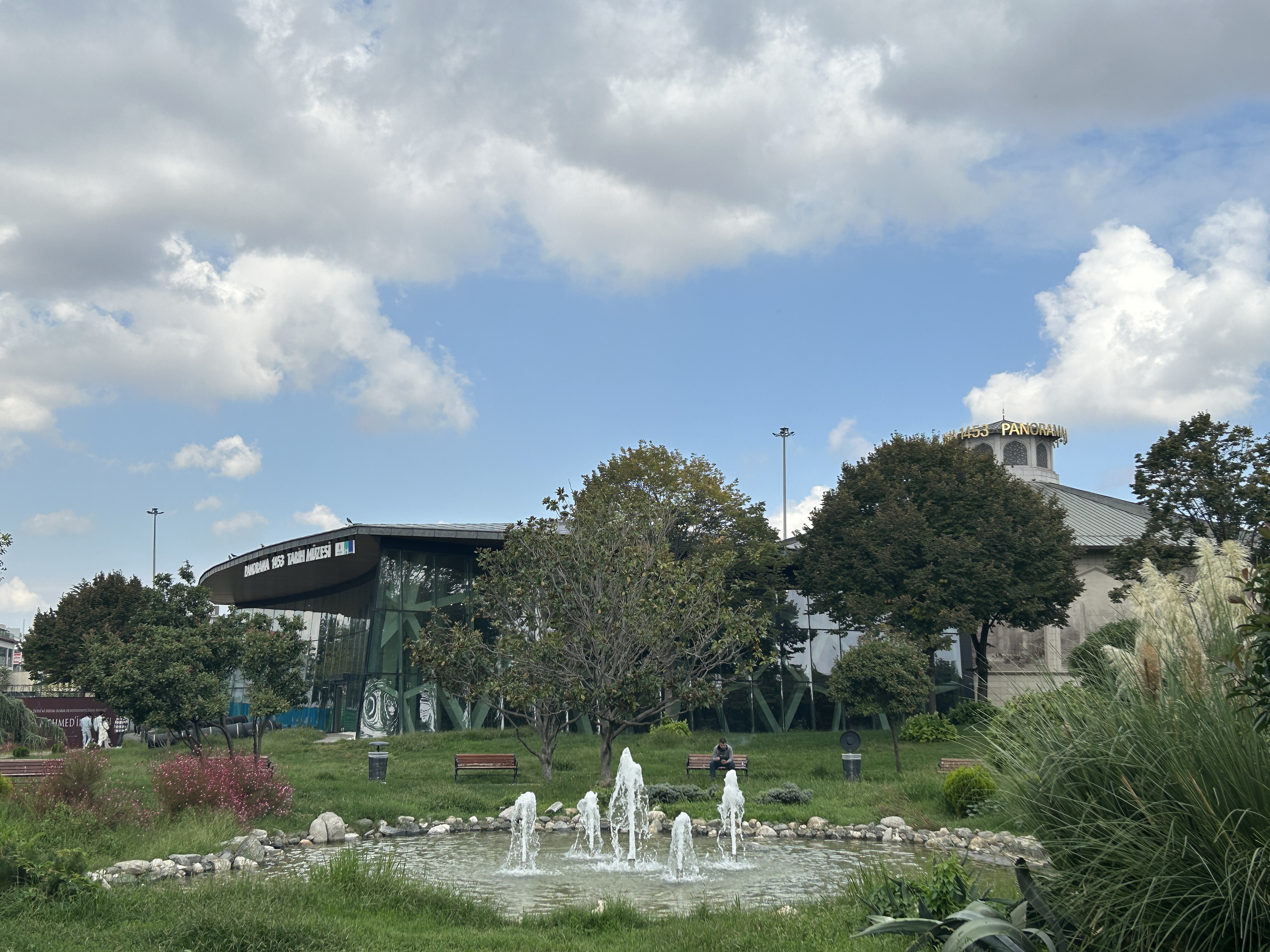
Panorama 1453 History Museum seen from the park area.

Construction of the building and the painting of the giant panorama mural started in 2005, with 8 artists working on the mural. The depiction of the damaged walls of the city was based on a report on the repair of the walls by the first mayor of Istanbul, Khidr. The painting of the mural was completed in 2008. The museum opened on January 31, 2009. It was completed at a cost of $5 million and is Turkey's first panoramic museum. The museum is the owner of ideas and the coordinator of the project is painter Hashim Citizen.

== A view from inside the Panorama Museum ==
This panoramic picture contains 10,000 figure drawings. The panoramic picture is drawn on a hemisphere 38 m in diameter. The picture has a surface area of 2,350 m^{2}; the platform where the 3D objects between the picture and the visitor platform is located is 650 m^{2} and the visitor is in every direction II. One voice of Mehmed's thousands of soldiers and the Mehter Marşı encircle. Also pictured is pigment ink, which has remained untouched for over 100 years.

The audience can experience a shock of up to 10 seconds on this platform in the museum. The first person to look at the panoramic picture on the museum will not be able to grasp the actual dimensions of the work because of their optical habits. This is due to the fact that the dimensions of the image do not have references to provide the concept, such as start and end points. While the museum is in a closed space, the visitor experiences a three-dimensional outer space again.

The museum is located opposite the Topkapı-Edirnekapı walls, where the embankment passes. In the vicinity of the museum you can see the Topkapı Walls and Silivrikapı walls in Constantinople, the first Turkish soldiers.
