= Sina Mesdag-van Houten =

Dutch painter (1834–1909)

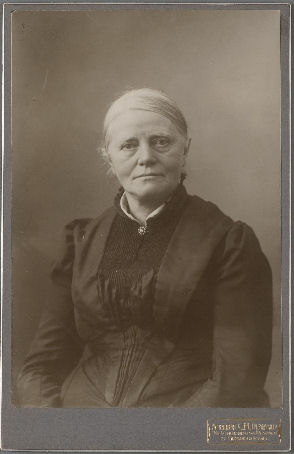
- Sientje van Houten (c.1905)
- Born: 23 December 1834; Groningen
- Died: 20 March 1909 (aged 74); The Hague
- Known for: Painting, art collecting
- Movement: Hague School
- Spouse: Hendrik Willem Mesdag
- Awards: Order of Oranje-Nassau

Sina (Sientje) van Houten (23 December 1834 Groningen – 20 March 1909 The Hague) was the wife of Hendrik Willem Mesdag, the Dutch marine painter of the Hague School, and a painter herself.

== Biography ==
She was the eldest of seven children of Derk van Houten and Barbara Elisabeth Meihuizen. One of her brothers was later Minister Samuel van Houten. Her father had a large sawmill on the Damsterdiep. She married Mesdag on 23 April 1856.

Sientje was a strong moral support to her husband, especially when she enthusiastically supported him in 1866, when he gave up his business profession solely for painting. She began to paint in 1871, after she lost her only child, the 8-year-old Klaas. Gerkens Arnaud helped her drawing, while her painting was aided by her husband and her cousin Lawrence Alma-Tadema. She specialized in landscapes and still lifes, but also painted portraits.

In 1874, together with Gerardina Jacoba van de Sande Bakhuyzen, Kate Bisschop-Swift and Margaretha Roosenboom, she painted "Hague orphans", a painting for the then Queen Sophie on the occasion of the 25-years royal jubilee of her husband, King Willem III.

In 1881 she took part in painting the Panorama Mesdag. As she worked, her husband painted her portrait, working on the panorama, and in the panorama itself she is portrayed sitting behind her easel.

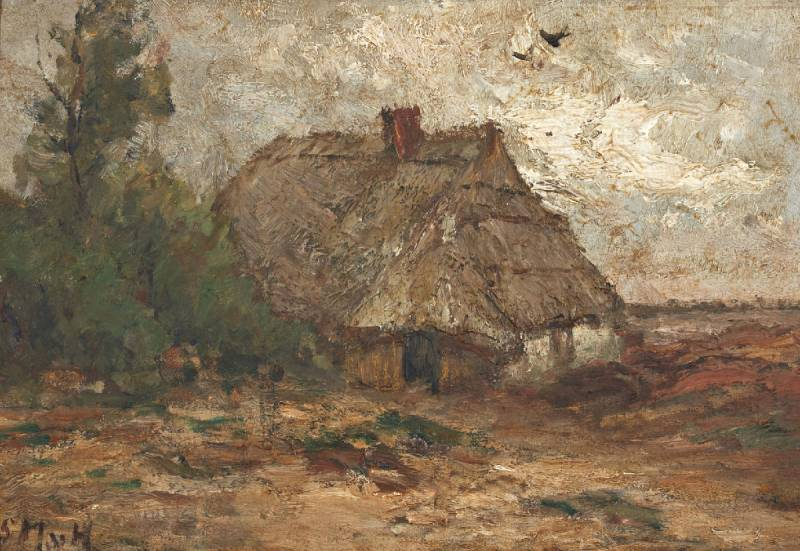
Sheepfold on the Heath

In 1884, one of her landscapes won a gold medal in Amsterdam she received a bronze medal in Paris for a heath landscape. In Melbourne, her work also received a bronze medal. She exhibited her work at the Palace of Fine Arts at the 1893 World's Columbian Exposition in Chicago, Illinois. When Sientje Mesdag was 70 years, in 1905, she had an honorary exhibition in the halls of the Pulchri Studio.

Her work has been exhibited in numerous countries, including Australia, Belgium, England, France, Italy, Austria and the US. On 21 December 1904 she was named Officer in the Order of Oranje-Nassau. In 1906 the Mesdag-Van Houten couple celebrated their golden anniversary. She died in the Hague, on 20 March 1909. She is buried in the Oud Eik en Duinen cemetery. He husband was also buried there in 1915. In 1930 her brother Samuel was laid in the same grave. Work by Van Houten is found in the collections of the Gemeentemuseum Den Haag, Panorama Mesdag, the Rijksmuseum Amsterdam, the Groningen Museum, the Drents Museum in Assen, the Fraeylemaborg in Slochteren, the Museum Lambert van Meerten in Delft and the Mesdag Collection.

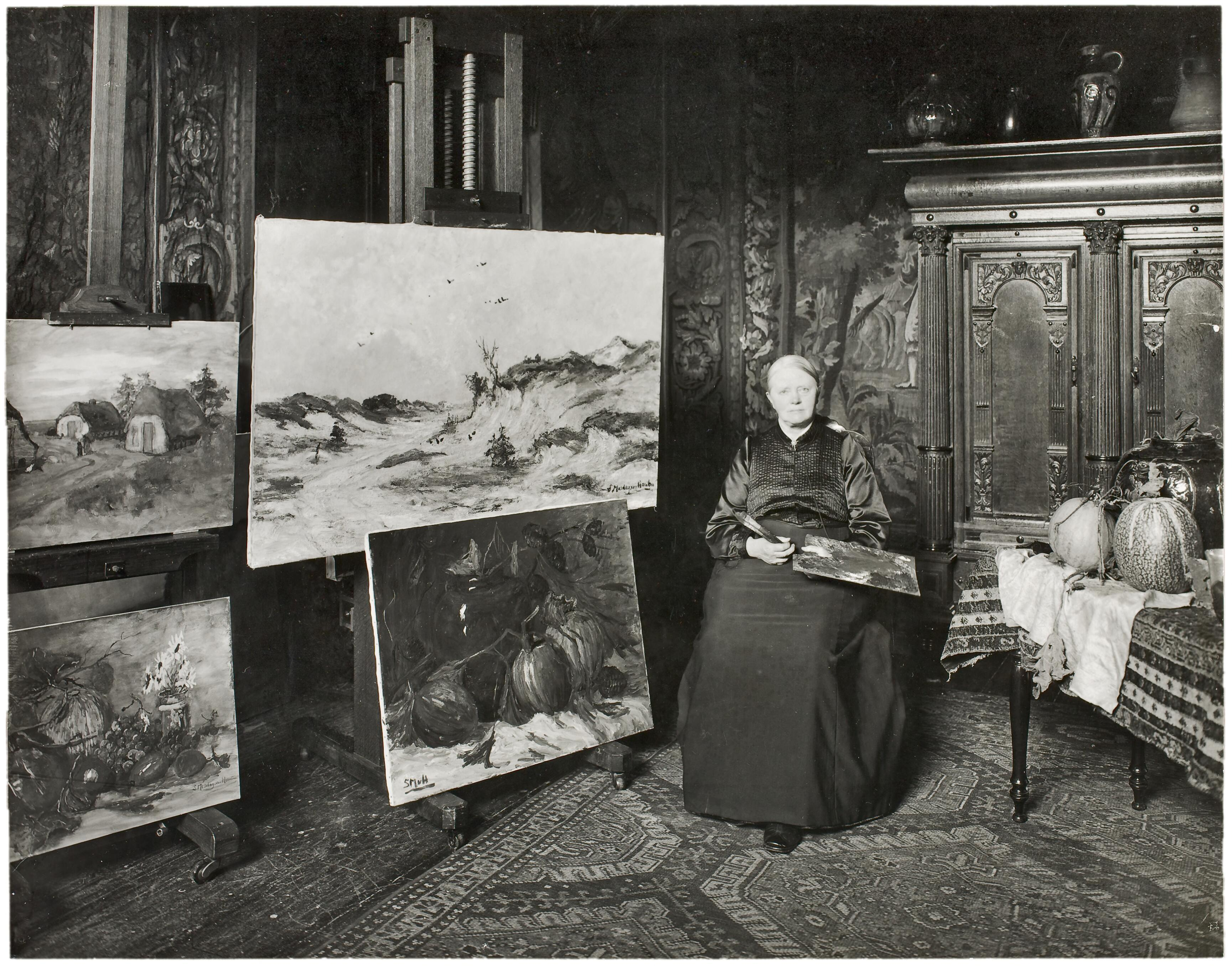
Portrait of the Dutch painter Sina Mesdag-van Houten in 1903
