= Lucien-Pierre Sergent =

French painter

Lucien-Pierre Sergent (8 June 1849 – 1904) was a French academic painter. He was known for his military art.

== Early life ==
Sergent was born in 1849 at Massy in the Seine-et-Oise department.

He was known as a student of Vauchelet Pils and Jean-Paul Laurens.

== Career ==
His 1874 painting, Le dernier effort à la porte Ballan, fin de la bataille de Sedan 1re septembre 1870 was purchased by the French government. It was installed at Prytanée National Militaire in the city of La Flèche.

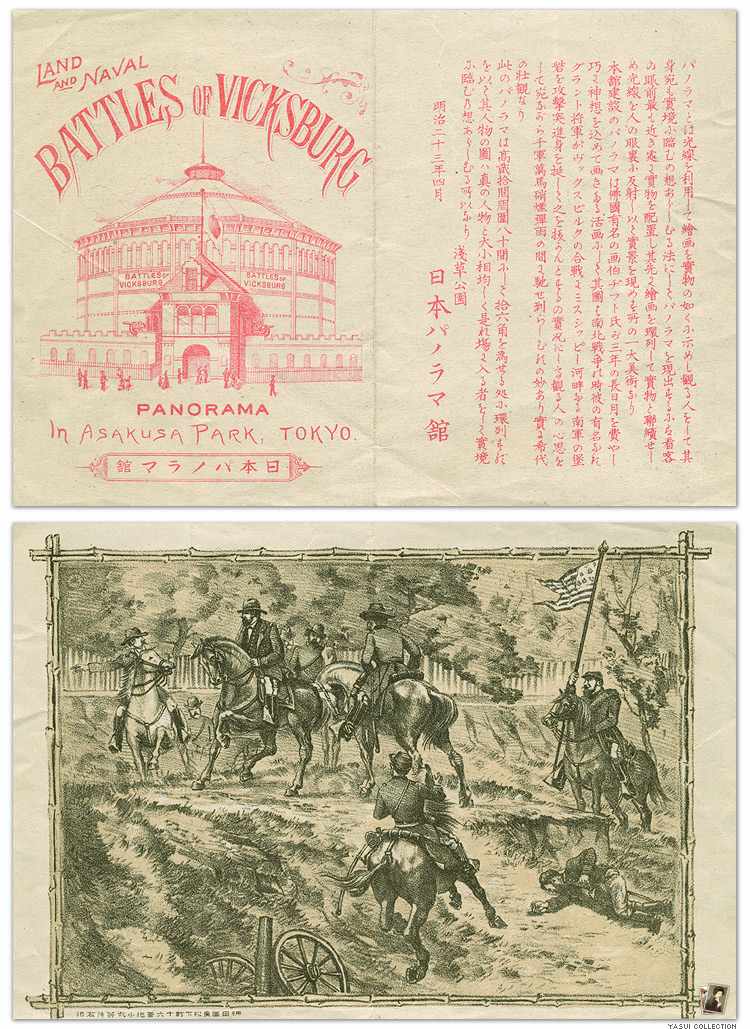
Publicity pamphlet for "Land and Naval Battles of Vicksburg, Panorama in Asakusa Park, Tokyo," a cyclorama mural by Sergent which was exhibited in Japan circa 1890s

His 1888 painting The Battles of Vicksburg, was a 360° panorama of the land and naval battles of Vicksburg in 1863 during the American Civil War. The work was completed and first exhibited in Paris; and it was subsequently shown in New York City, Chicago and San Francisco before it was installed in Tokyo.
