= Hendrik Willem Mesdag =

Dutch painter

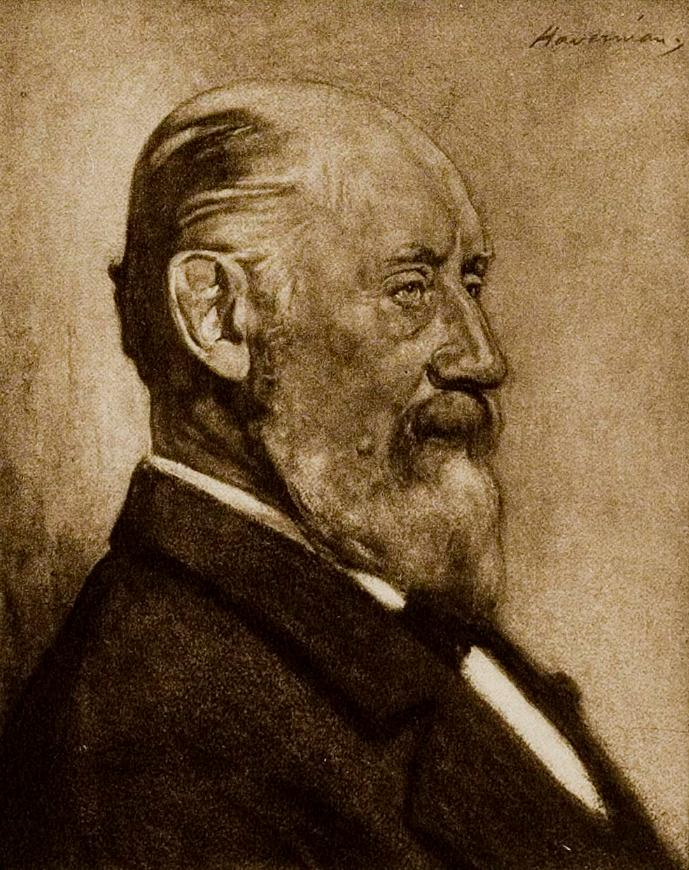
- Portrait of Hendrik Willem Mesdag by Hendrik Haverman
- Born: 23 February 1831; Groningen, Netherlands
- Died: 10 July 1915 (aged 84); The Hague, Netherlands
- Known for: Painting, art collecting
- Notable work: Panorama Mesdag
- Movement: Hague School
- Spouse: Sina Mesdag-van Houten

Hendrik Willem Mesdag (Dutch pronunciation: [ˈɦɛndrɪk ˈʋɪləm ˈmɛzdɑx]; 23 February 1831 – 10 July 1915) was a Dutch marine painter.

== Biography ==
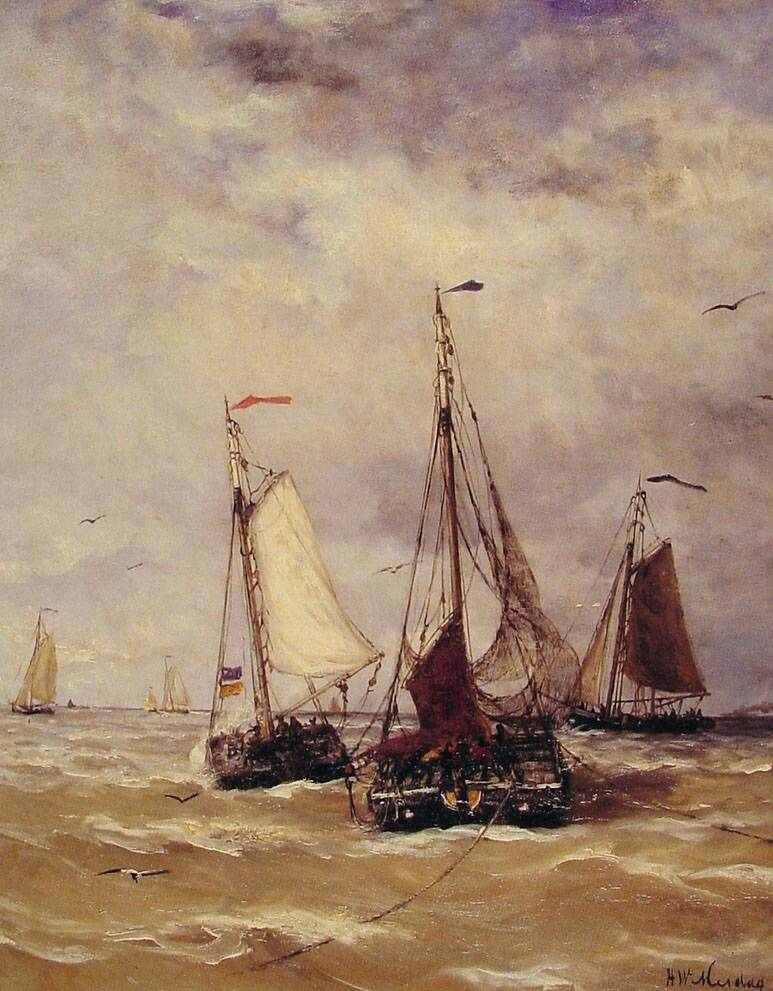
Preparations for departure

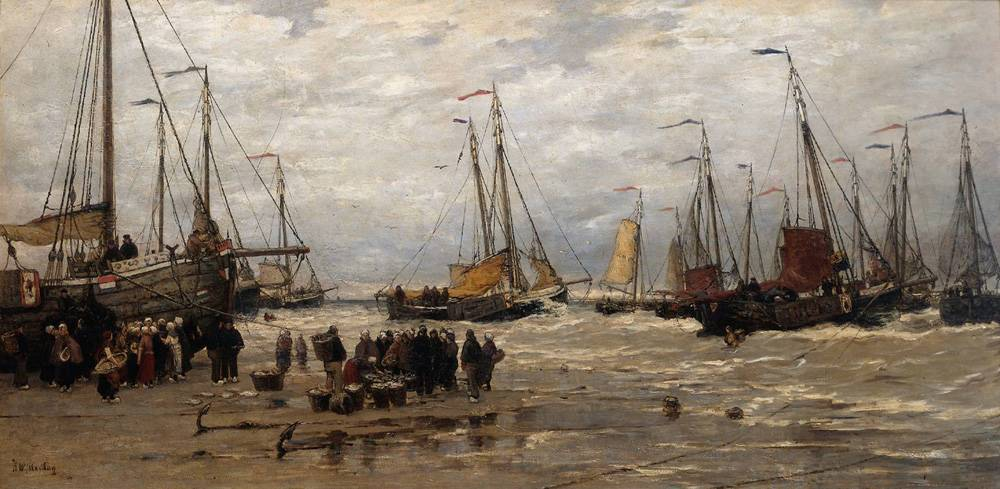
Pinks in the breakers, c. 1880

He was born in Groningen, the son of the banker Klaas Mesdag and his wife Johanna Wilhelmina van Giffen. Mesdag was encouraged by his father, an amateur painter, to study art. He married Sina van Houten in 1856, and when they inherited a fortune from her father, Mesdag retired from banking at the age of 35 to pursue a career as a painter.

He studied in Brussels with Willem Roelofs and in 1868 moved to The Hague to paint the sea. In 1870 he exhibited at the Paris Salon and won the gold medal for The Breakers of the North Sea.

In 1880 he received a commission from a Belgian company to paint a panorama giving a view over the village of Scheveningen on the North Sea coast near The Hague. With the help of Sina and students he completed the enormous painting, Panorama Mesdag,— 14 m high and 120 m around — by 1881. However, the vogue for panoramas was coming to an end, and when the company operating it went bust in 1886, Mesdag purchased the painting at auction and thereafter funded its operating losses from his own pocket.

He joined the art society of The Hague (the Pulchri Studio) and in 1889 was elected chairman. In 1903 he gave his house at Laan van Meerdervoort and his collection of paintings to the Netherlands; the house is now The Mesdag Collection.

== Honours ==
- 1903: Knight Grand Cross in the Order of Orange-Nassau.
