= Pál Vágó =

Hungarian painter

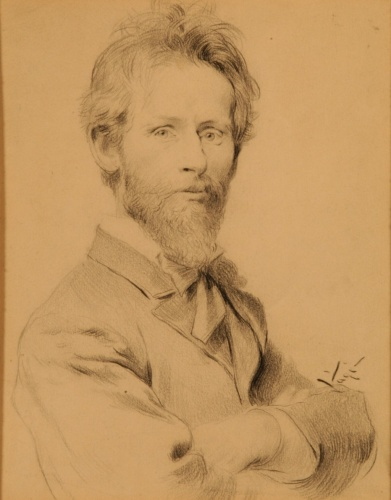
Self-portrait (date unknown)

Pál Vágó (6 June 1853, Jászapáti - 15 October 1928, Budapest) was a Hungarian painter, known for his historical scenes and cycloramas.

== Biography ==
His father was a minor government official who died when Pál was still a small child. He originally studied to be a lawyer, but found art more to his liking. His first lessons were in Munich with Alexander Wagner, followed by a stay in Paris with Jean-Paul Laurens. At first, he was heavily influenced by the German Academic style, but later turned to landscapes painted in his native region.

His first success came in 1881, with a canvas depicting the disastrous 1879 flood that destroyed Szeged. In 1887, he participated in an exhibition at the Hall of Art and was awarded the Grand Prix. From that point on, he specialized in monumental historical scenes and was a major participant in the various arts shows connected with the Hungarian Millennium celebrations in 1896. The following year, he was one of the painters who worked with Jan Styka to create the Transylvania Panorama. His cyclorama, "The History of the Hussars", was a popular attraction at the Exposition Universelle (1900) and was taken on an international tour.

He also provided illustrations for a twenty-one volume set of books called The Austro-Hungarian Monarchy in Word and Picture (commonly known in German as the "Kronprinzenwerk", after its sponsor, Rudolf, Crown Prince of Austria). Later, he created frescoes in several churches in his hometown and, together with László Pataky, decorated the Ludovica Military Academy.

== Selected works ==
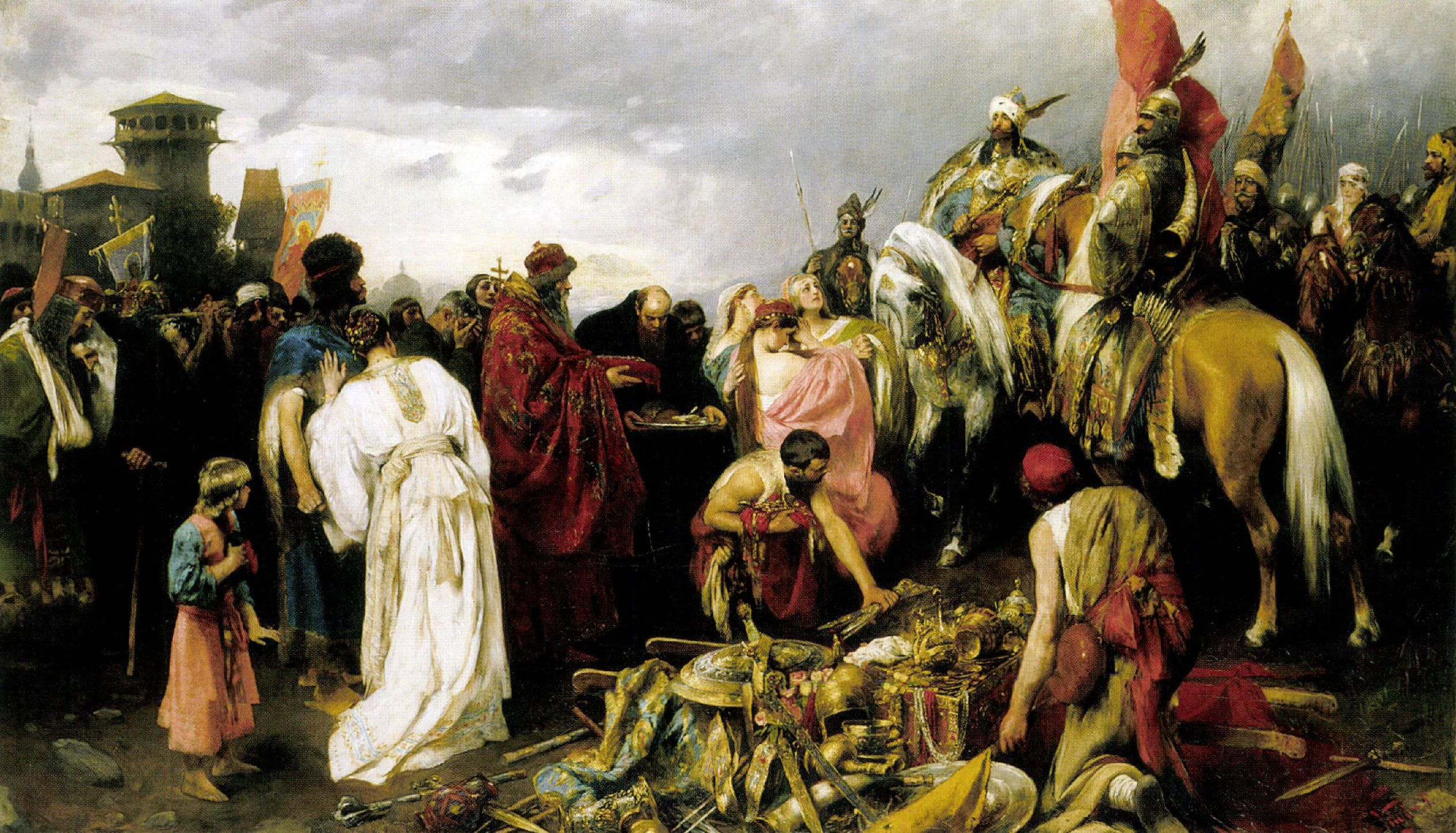
The Hungarians at Kiev

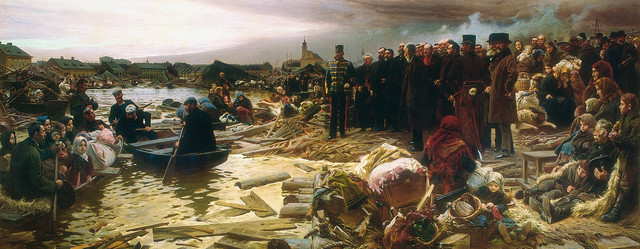
The Great Flood of Szeged
