= Michał Gorstkin-Wywiórski =

Polish painter (1861–1926)

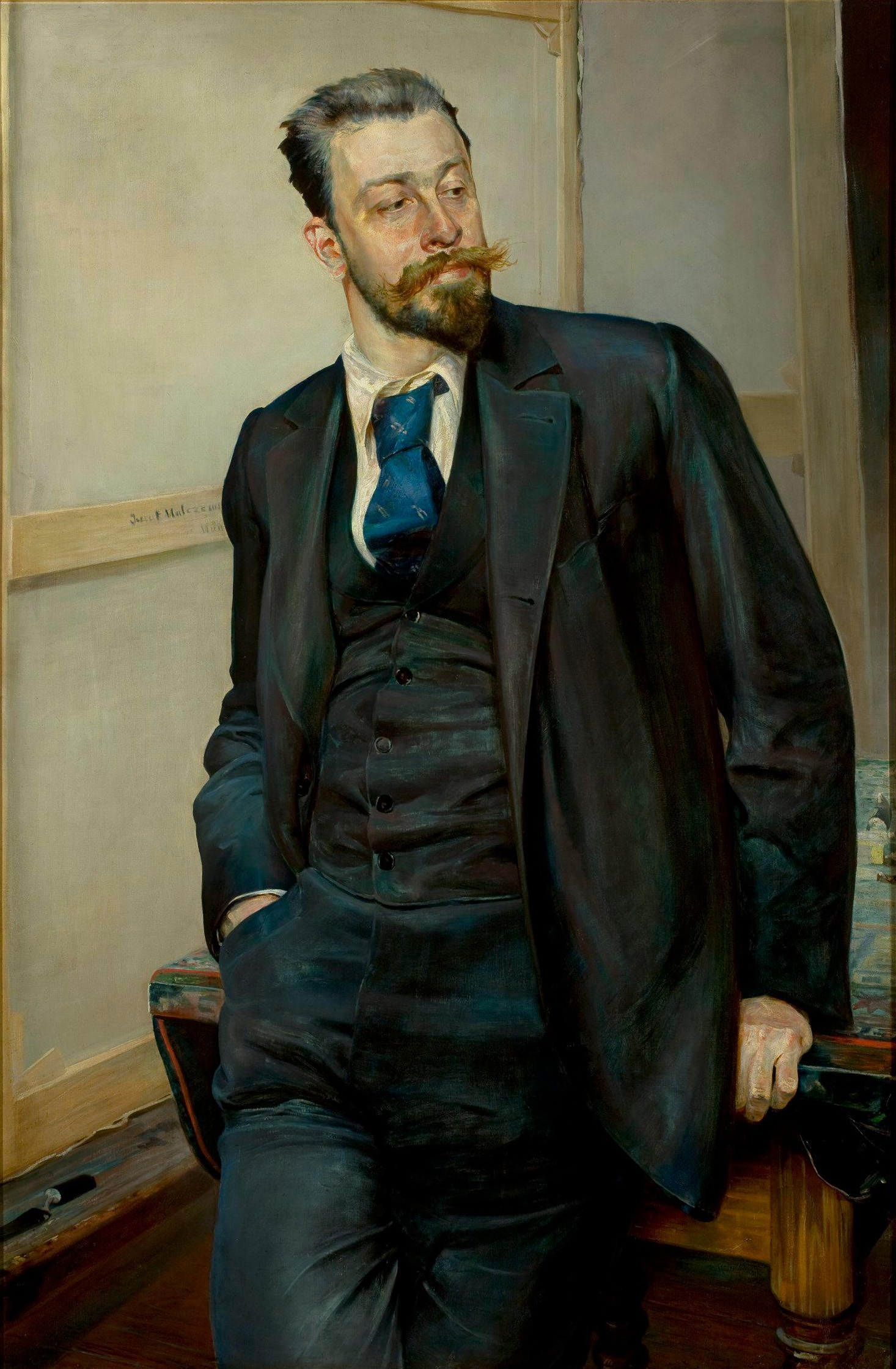
- Portrait of Gorstkin-Wywiórski by Jacek Malczewski
- Born: Michał Paweł Gorstkin; March 14, 1861; Warsaw, Warsaw Governorate, Congress Poland
- Died: May 30, 1926 (aged 65); Berlin, Free State of Prussia, Weimar Republic
- Education: Riga Polytechnical Institute; Academy of Fine Arts, Munich Academy of Fine Arts

Michał Paweł Gorstkin-Wywiórski (14 March 1861, Warsaw - 30 May 1926, Berlin) was a Polish painter; primarily of landscapes and maritime scenes. Because of this, he was also an amateur naturalist and maritime historian.

== Biography ==
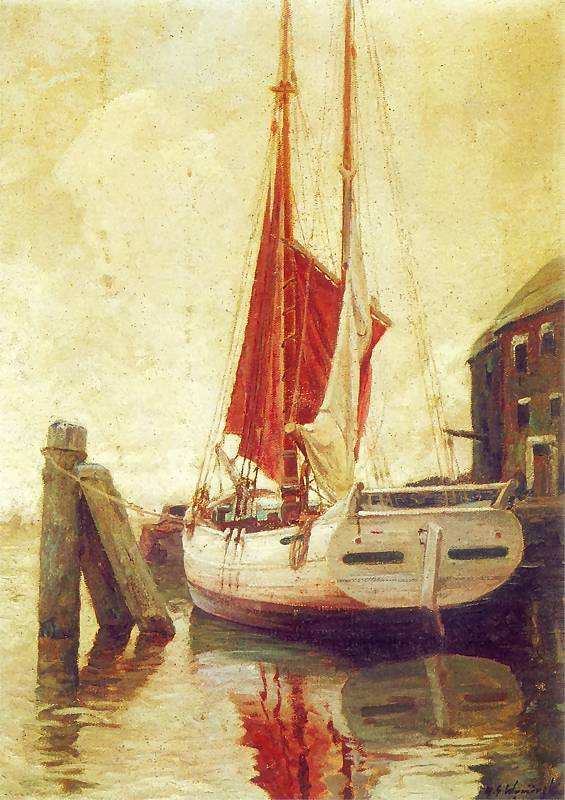
Sailboat (1918)

Gorstkin-Wywiórski was the son of a Russian army officer and his Polish wife. From 1881 to 1882, he studied chemistry at the Riga Polytechnical Institute and became a member of Arkonia, an "academic corporation" devoted to Polish patriotism. It was then that he began adding his mother's maiden name to Gorstkin. A sudden illness forced him to discontinue his studies and return home.

After a brief stay in Zurich for his health, Gorstkin-Wywiórski decided to study art instead. From 1883 to 1887, he studied at the Royal Academy of Fine Arts with Karl Raupp and Nikolaos Gyzis. He also took private lessons with Józef Brandt and Alfred Kowalski. In 1894, his painting of a Lithuanian forest earned him a second-class medal at the Glaspalast. After 1895, he lived in Berlin for several years before returning to Poland. While there, at the invitation of Wojciech Kossak and Julian Fałat, he participated in painting a panorama depicting the Battle of Berezina. This was followed by an invitation from Jan Styka to work on the Transylvania Panorama.

After that, he devoted himself to travel, visiting (among many other places) Spain (1899-1900), Egypt (1900-1901), Scandinavia (1903-1904) and the Carpathians (1906). In Spain, he and Kossak gathered material for a panorama of the Battle of Somosierra, which was never completed because of objections from the Russian authorities. In Egypt, he made sketches for a panorama of the Battle of the Pyramids.

At first, he painted genre scenes dealing primarily with Cossacks and Tatars. Later, under the influence of the Young Poland movement, he shifted his interest to landscapes and marine art. He was a member of several art societies and professional groups in Poznań, which was his primary home after 1904.

== Selected paintings ==
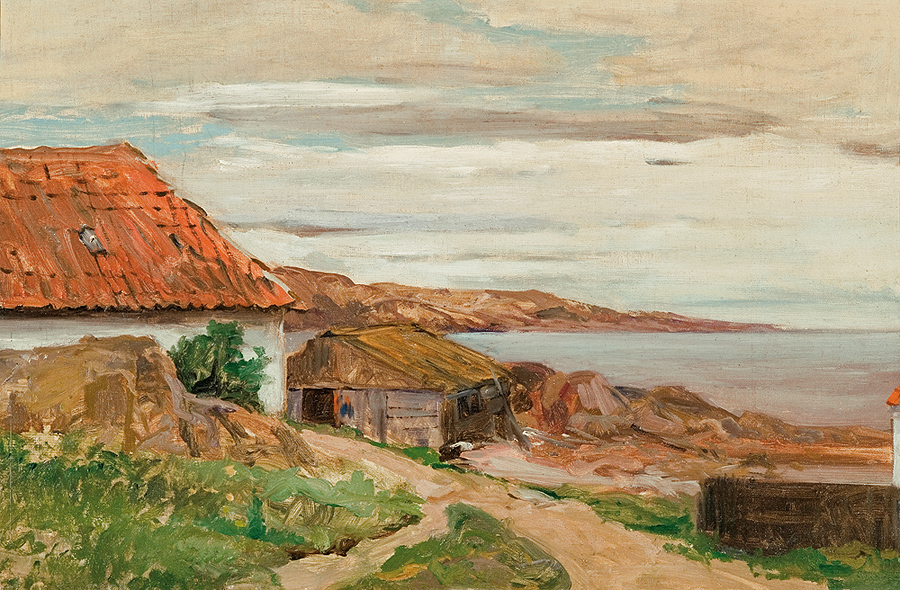
Village on the Gulf

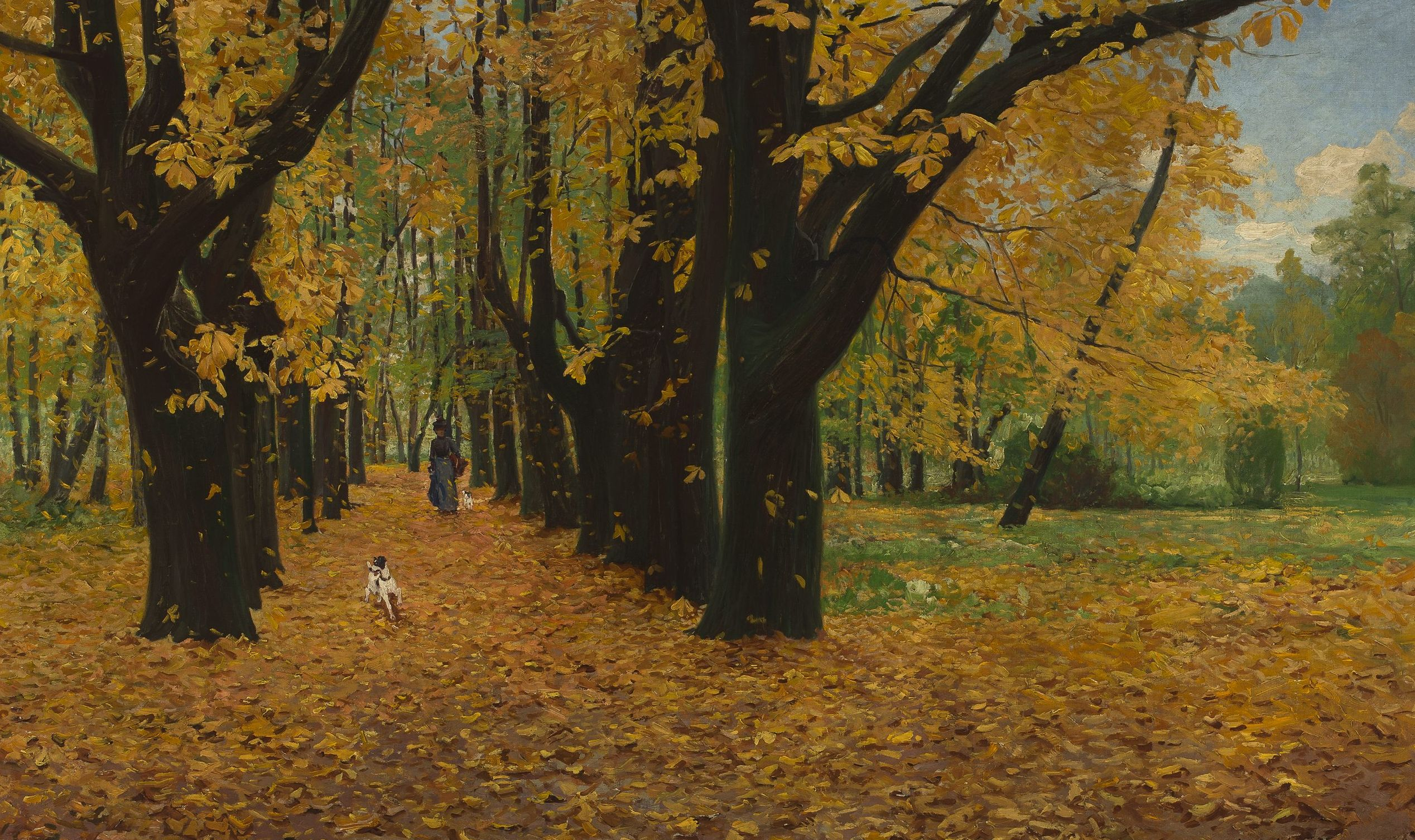
Park in Autumn

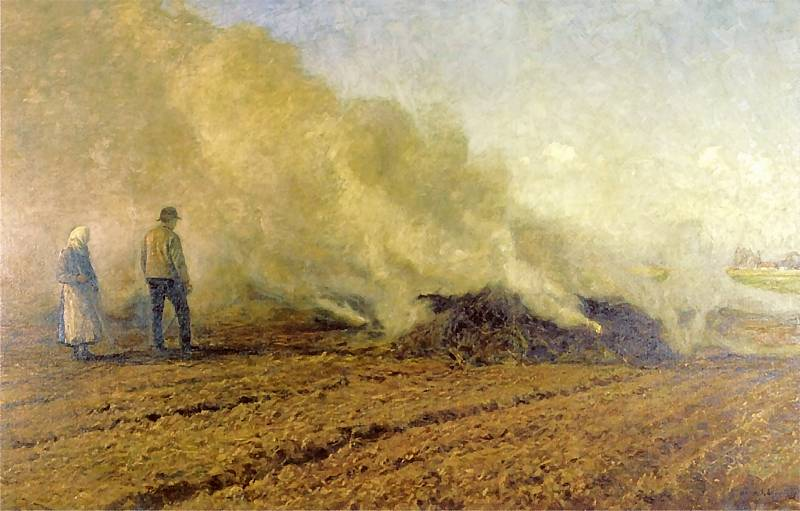
Bonfire

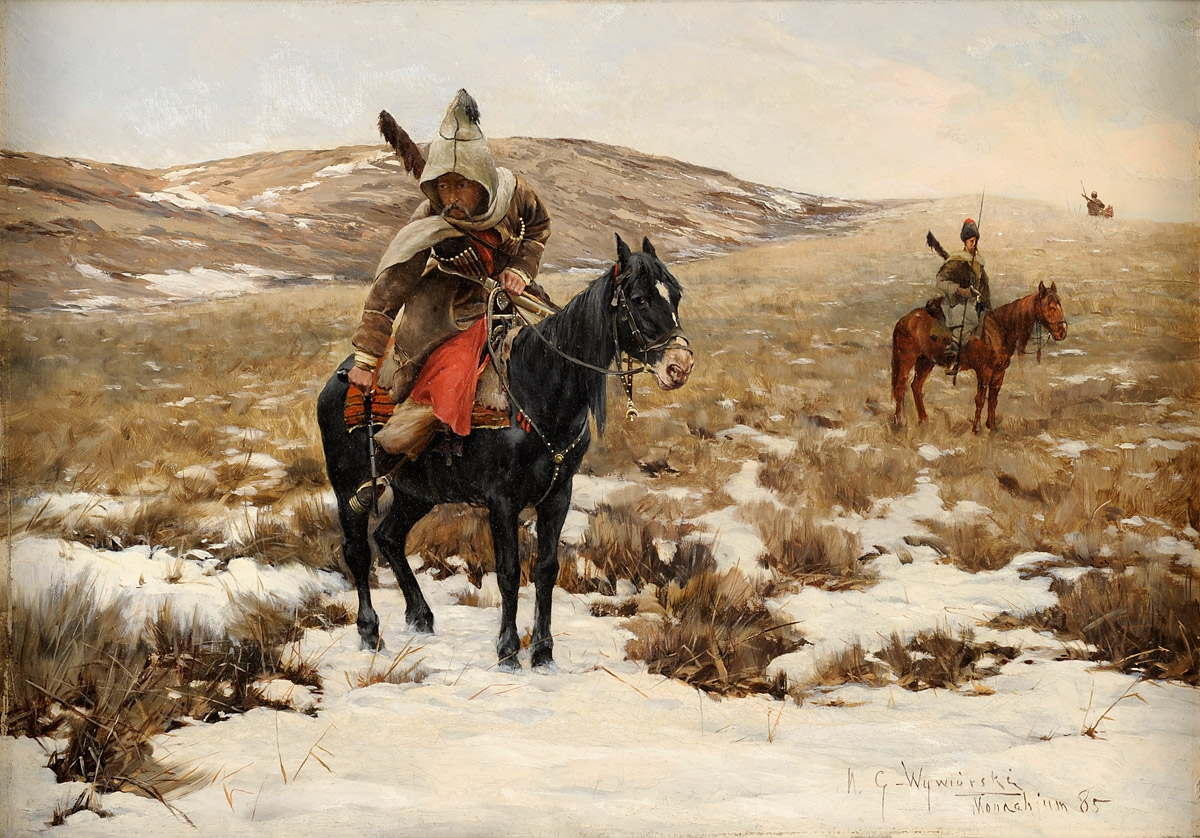
Vigilant Cossacks
