= Transylvania Panorama =

1897 painting

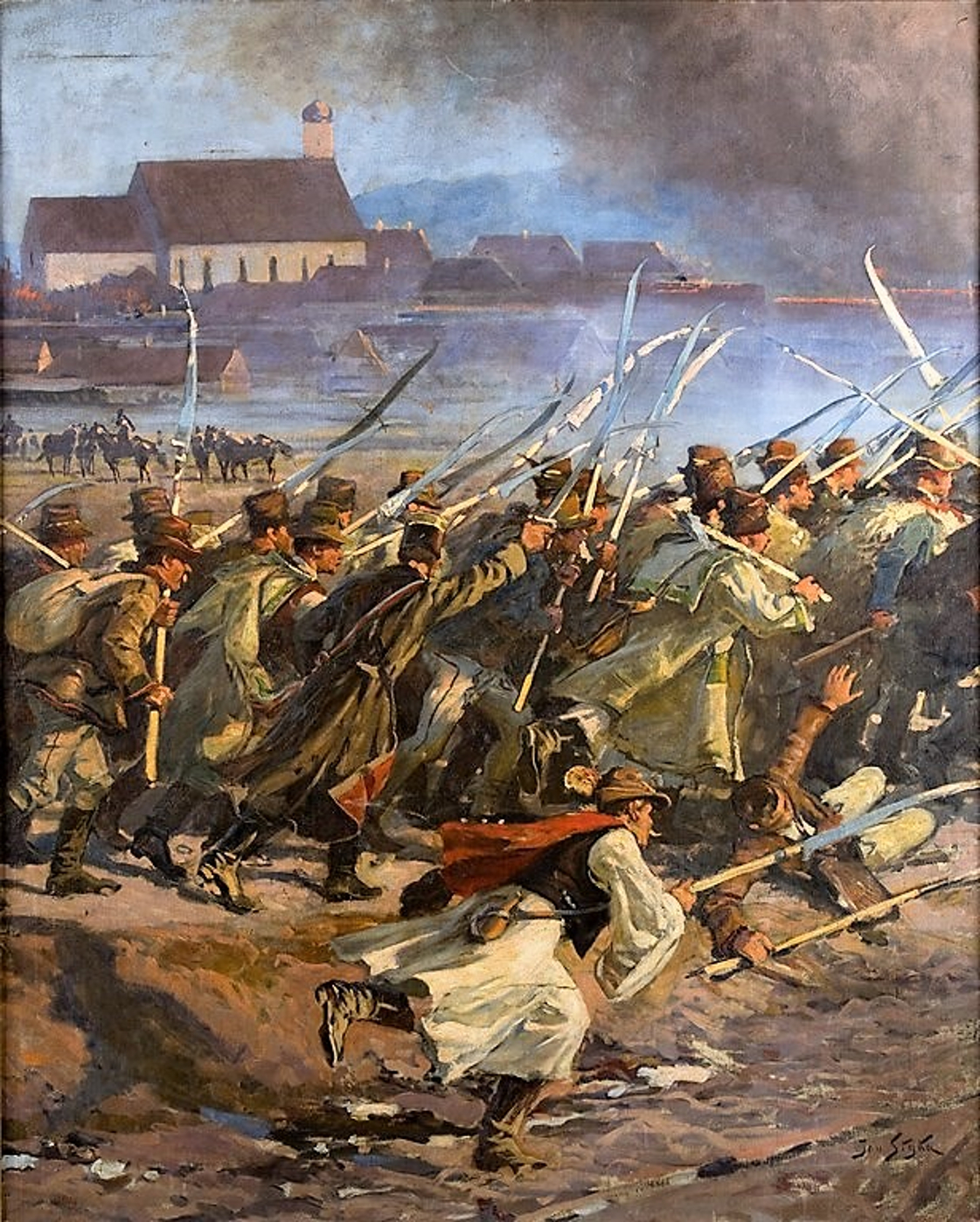
Fragment of Transylvanian Panorama - Tarnów Museum

The Transylvanian Panorama (Polish: Panorama Siedmiogrodzka) other names Bem and Petőfi, Bem in Transylvania, Battle of Segesvár / Schässburg - village of Fehéregyháza, meaning White Church was a monumental (15 × 100 metre) panoramic painting depicting the Battle of Nagyszeben, during the Hungarian Revolution of 1848-49.

== History ==
The idea came from the Hungarians who wanted to commemorate the 50th anniversary of the Revolutions of 1848–49. It was painted by many painters under the direction of Jan Styka in the Lwów (Lviv) rotunda, located in Stryjski Park, the same place where the Racławice Panorama was painted. The project was finished in September 1897 by painters of three nations:

- Hungarian: Tihamér Margitay, Pál Vágó and Béla Spányi,
- Polish: Tadeusz Popiel, Zygmunt Rozwadowski, Michał Gorstkin-Wywiórski,
- and the German painter Leopold Schönchen.

The painting was exhibited in Lwow, Budapest and Warsaw. It was cut into 100 pieces but only 31 of them now survive. Twenty fragments currently are located in a few Polish museums in Tarnów, Warsaw, Krosno and Łęczyca. Another 11 pieces are in private collections in Poland and abroad.

The Battle of Nagyszeben was fought on 11 March 1849 between the Hungarian Transylvanian Army led by the Polish general Józef Bem and the coalition of Austrian and Russian armies commanded by Generals Anton Puchner and Grigory Skariatin.

== Bibliography ==
- Cz. Czapliński, Saga rodu Styków, Nowy Jork 1988; E. Górecka,
- Panoramy Wojciecha Kossaka i Jana Styki, Muzeum Narodowe we Wrocławiu, Wrocław 2000,
- Kwartalnik: "Cenne, bezcenne, utracone" nr 2(51) kwiecień-czerwiec 2007, A. Majcherek-Węgrzynek "Panorama Siedmiogrodzka - fragmenty zlokalizowane poza granicami Polski"
