= Tadeusz Popiel =

Polish painter (1863–1913)

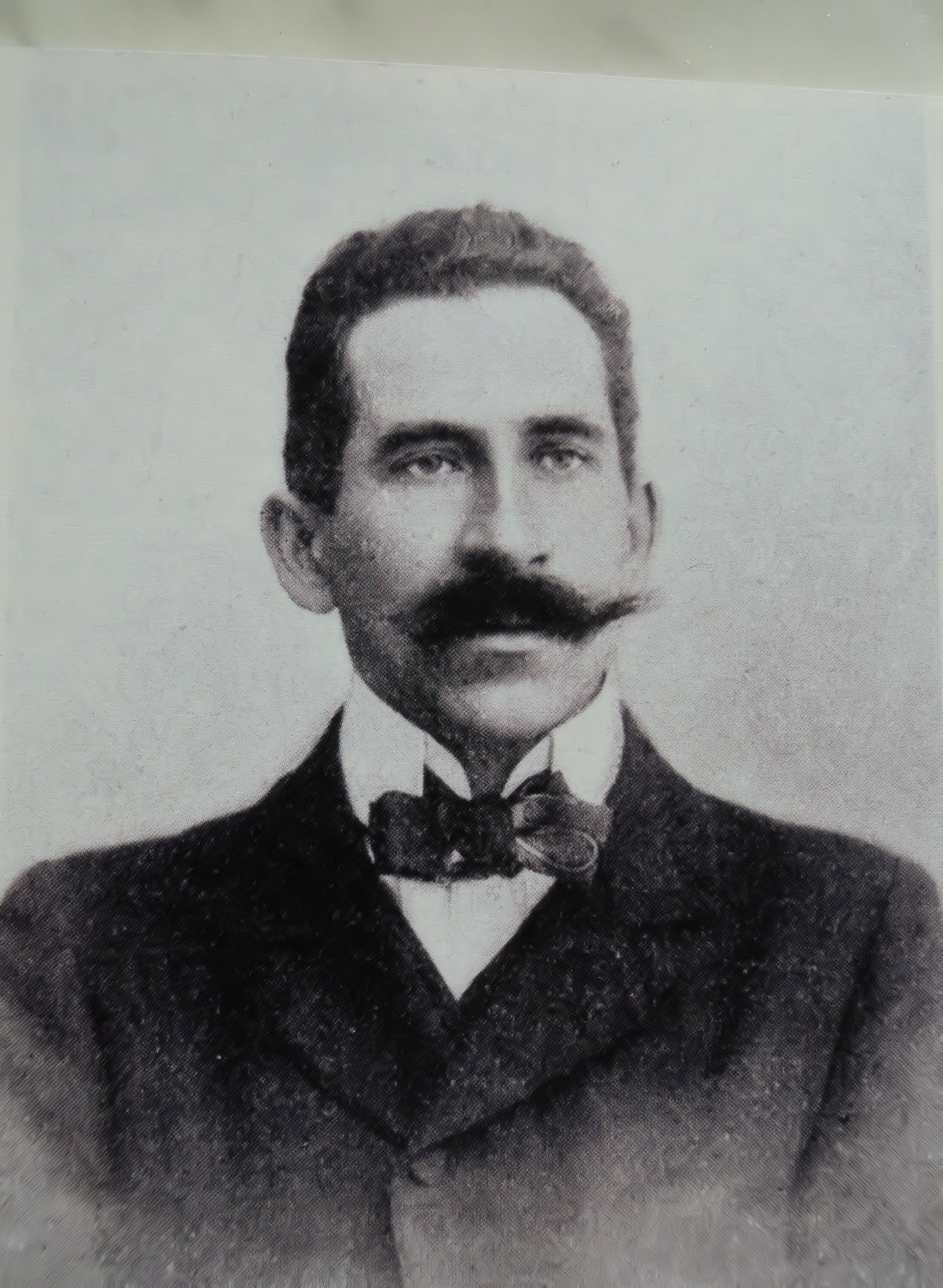
Tadeusz Popiel (date unknown)

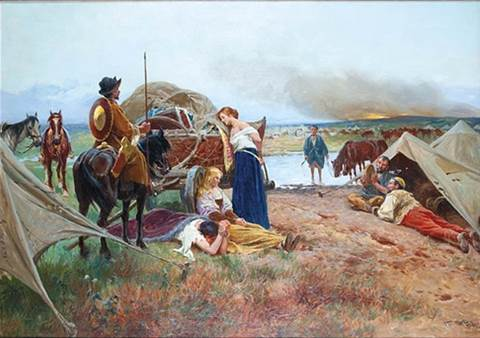
Tatar Captives (1896)

Tadeusz Popiel (1863 – 22 February 1913) was a Polish painter, known for his religious and historical scenes; especially his work on several famous panoramas. His brother was the sculptor Antoni Popiel.

== Biography ==
He was born in Szczucin to a family of the minor nobility and began his studies at the Kraków Academy of Fine Arts with Władysław Łuszczkiewicz and Leopold Loeffler. He later studied composition with Jan Matejko, who became his patron; then continued in Vienna and Munich. After his studies were completed, he travelled extensively all through the 1890s, visiting Denmark, Italy, Romania and Russia, among other places. He also exhibited widely, winning medals at the Exposition Universelle (1889) and the California Midwinter International Exposition of 1894.

His major works of this period included decorations at the Basilica of Saint Anthony of Padua (the result of winning a competition) and at theaters in Lwów. He also designed murals, frescoes and stained glass windows for churches and other public buildings throughout Poland. Later, he established a drawing school and was one of the founders of the Society of Artists in Poznań.

At various times, he lived in Kraków, Lwów and Chernivtsi. During his later years, he spent most of his time in Swoszowice, where he had his studio, and increasingly turned to landscapes. He died in 1913, in Kraków. By the time of his death, his work was considered to be old-fashioned and he is chiefly remembered for the work he did on several panoramas produced by Jan Styka; such as the Racławice Panorama and the Transylvania Panorama.
