= Racławice Panorama =

Late 19th-century cycloramic painting

Coordinates: 51°06′37″N 17°02′40″E

- Panorama Racławicka (Polish)
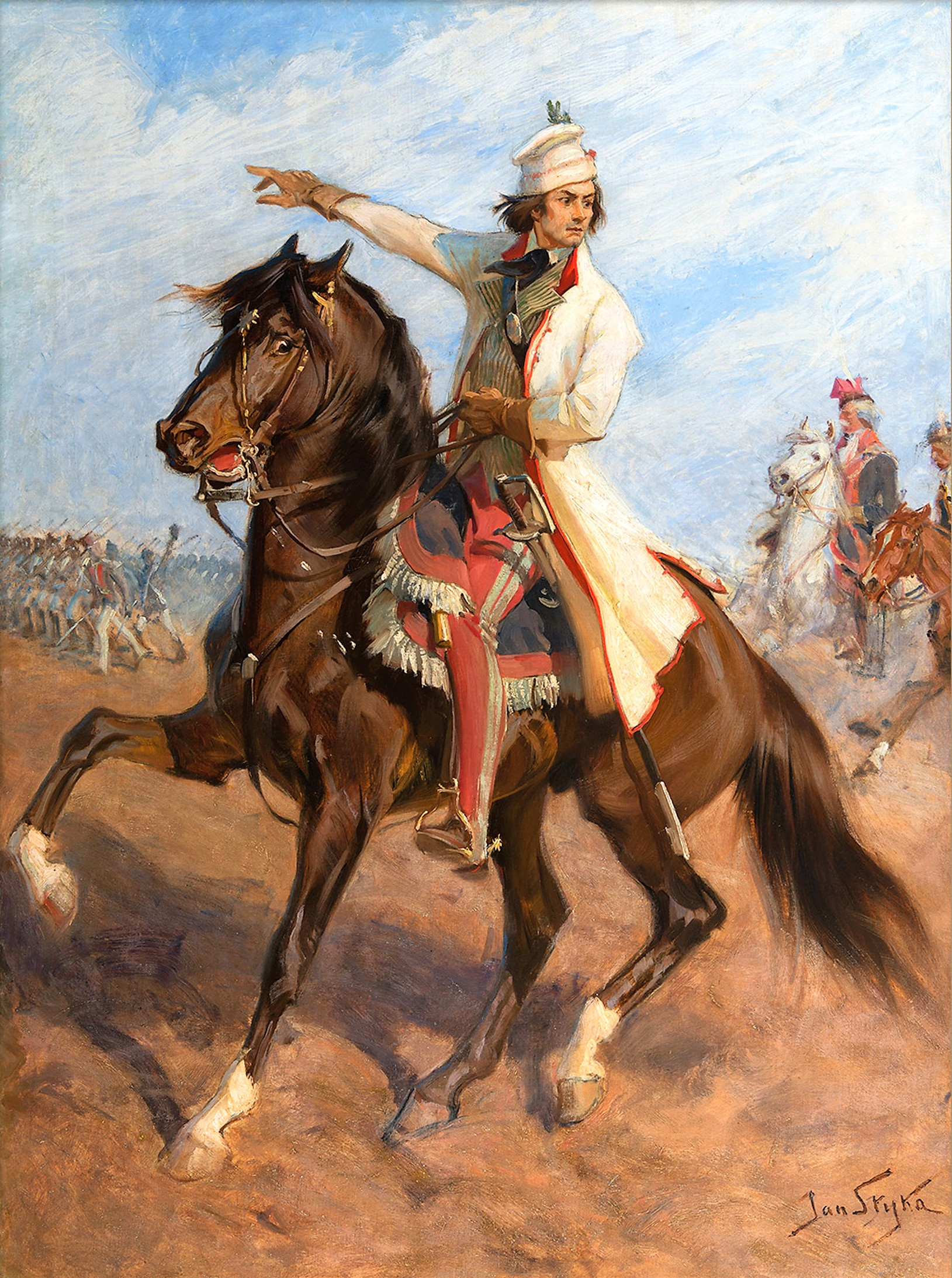
- Sketch of Kosciusko for the panorama by Kossak
- Artists: Jan Styka, Wojciech Kossak, et al.
- Year: 1893–1894
- Type: Oil on canvas, cyclorama
- Dimensions: 15 m × 114 m (49 ft × 374 ft)
- Location: Wrocław, Poland

Racławice Panorama
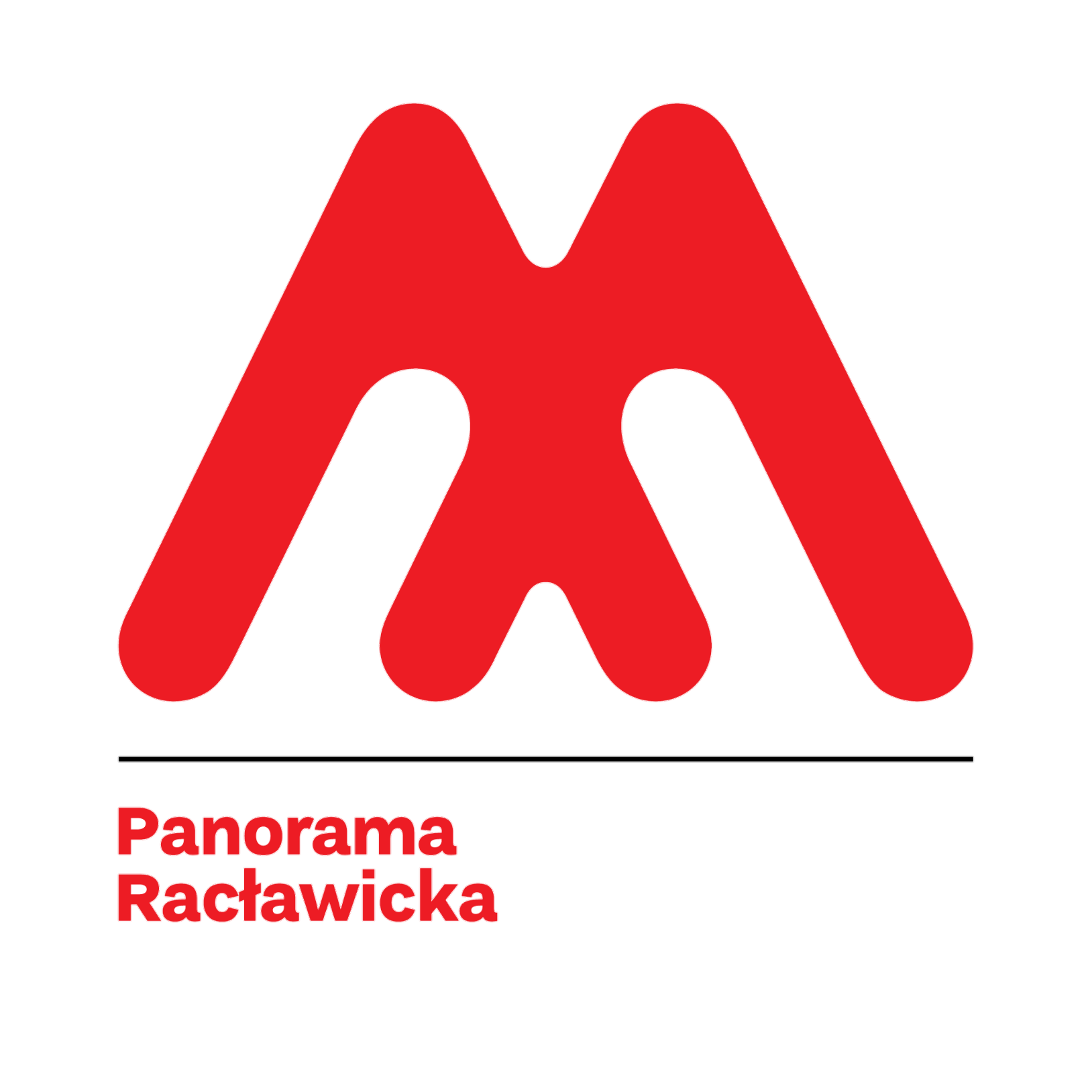

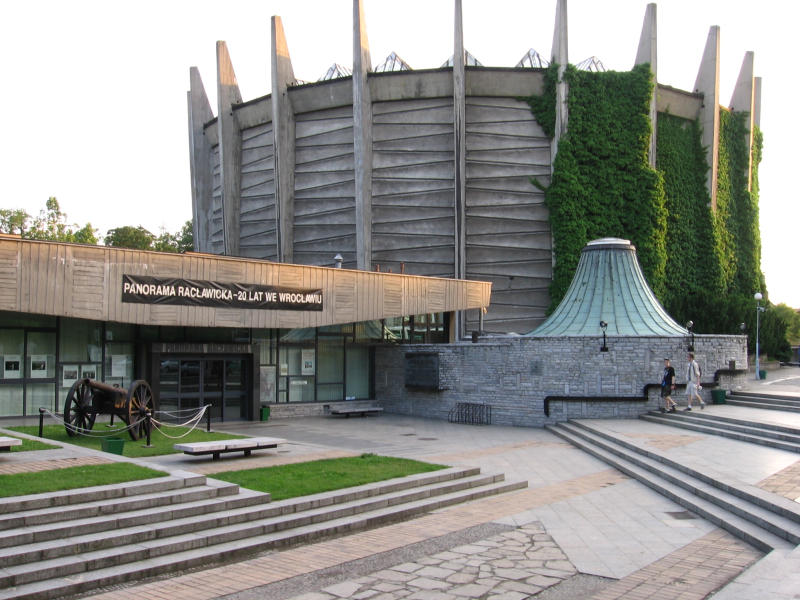
- Racławice Panorama (2005)
- Established: 14 June 1985; 41 years ago
- Location: Wrocław, Poland
- Website: panoramaraclawicka.pl

The Racławice Panorama (Polish: Panorama Racławicka) is a monumental (15 × 114 meter) cycloramic painting depicting the Battle of Racławice, during the Kościuszko Uprising. It is located in Wrocław, Poland. The painting is one of only a few preserved relics of a genre of 19th-century mass culture, and the oldest in Poland. The panorama stands in a circular fashion and, with the viewer in the center, presents different scenes at various viewing angles. A special kind of perspective used in the painting and additional effects (lighting, artificial terrain) create a feeling of reality.

== History ==
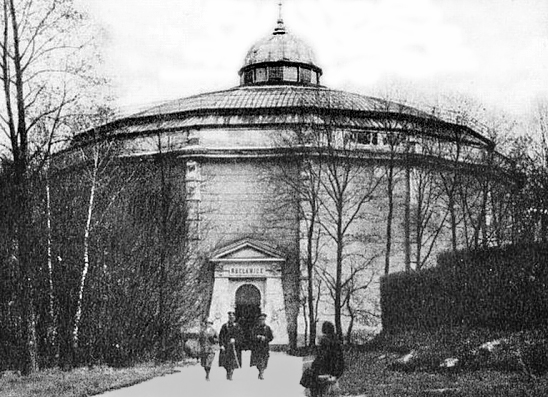
Former location in Lwów

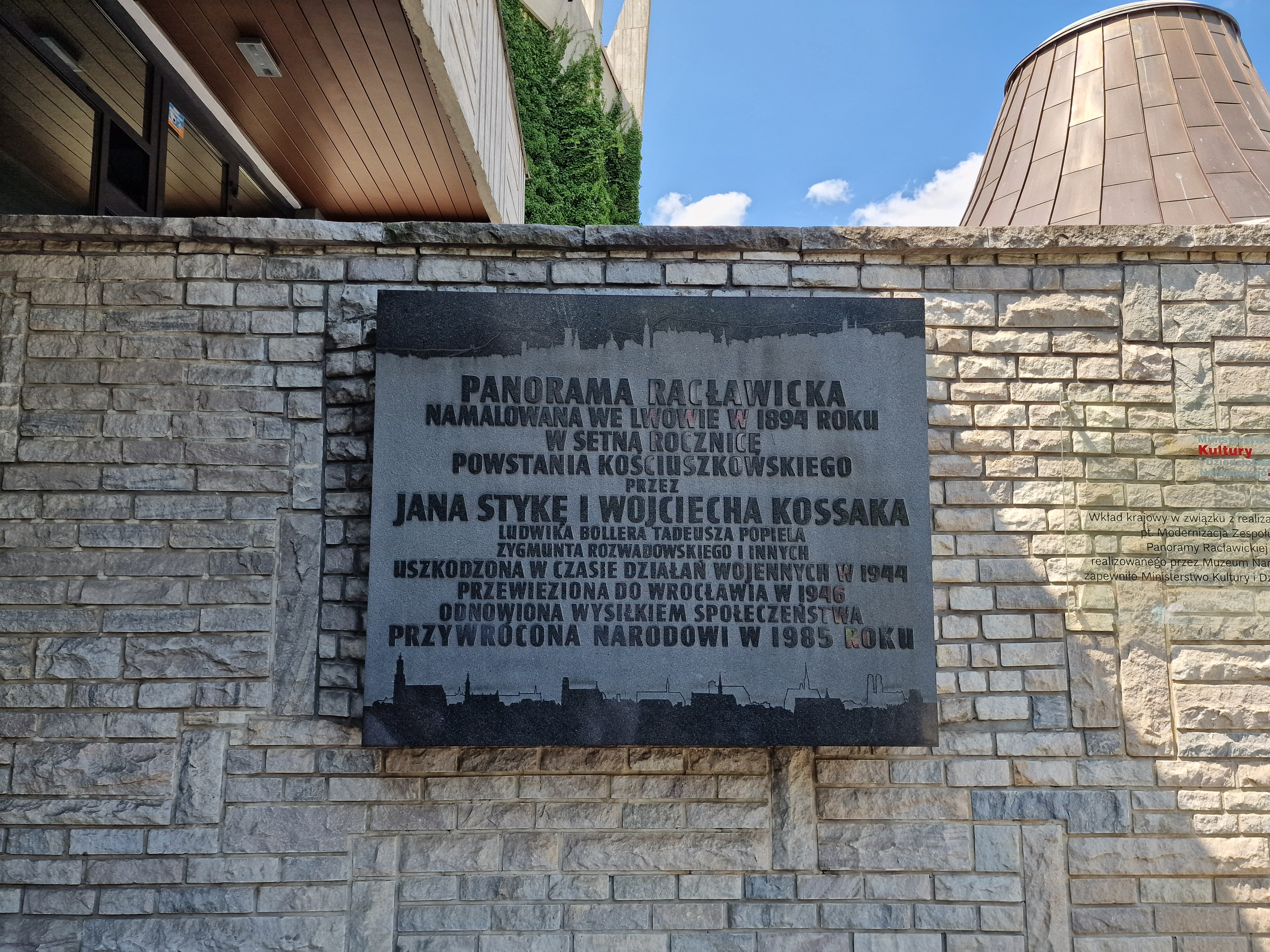
Commemorative plaque dedicated to the creators of the Racławice Panorama, Jan Styka and Wojciech Kossak, at the Racławice Panorama Museum in Wrocław, Poland

The idea came from the painter Jan Styka in Lviv (then Lwów) who invited battle-painter Wojciech Kossak to participate in the project. They were assisted by Ludwik Boller, Tadeusz Popiel, Zygmunt Rozwadowski, Teodor Axentowicz, Włodzimierz Tetmajer, Wincenty Wodzinowski and Michał Sozański.

The project was conceived as a patriotic commemoration of the 100th anniversary of the victorious Battle of Racławice, a famous episode of the Kościuszko Insurrection, a heroic but ultimately failed attempt to defend Polish independence. The battle was fought on 4 April 1794 between the insurrectionist force of regulars and peasant volunteers (armed with scythes) under Kościuszko (1746–1817) himself and the Russian army commanded by General Alexander Tormasov. For the nation which had lost its independence, the memory of this victory was important.

The General National Exhibition in Lviv, in 1894, offered an excellent opportunity to realize Styka's idea. Canvas, woven to order, was bought in Brussels, the specially built rotunda's iron structure (designed by Ludwik Ramułt) in Vienna. The rotunda, located in Stryjski Park in Lwów, was ready in July 1893. The huge panoramic painting was executed within 9 months, between August 1893 and May 1894. The official opening was on 5 June 1894. Since the very beginning, the Panorama of the Battle of Racławice attracted enormous attention and brought crowds of tourists to Lwów. On average 75,000 viewers visited it every year.

After World War II, the painting was brought to Wrocław (formerly Breslau in Germany) along with a part of the collection of the Ossoliński Institute. As under the communist regime, the subject was considered politically sensitive, the efforts to have the canvas restored and exhibited, undertaken by successive Volunteer Committees, were successful only after August 1980. Reopened on 14 June 1985, the major attraction of the old Lwów became an important tourist attraction of Wrocław. Here, contemporary viewers have an opportunity to participate in a unique illusionist spectacle. Today, the panorama attracts around 400,000 visitors annually.

== Notable visitors ==
Franz Joseph I of Austria visited the Racławice panorama on 8 September 1894 and said, "Imposant. Es hat mich frappirt" ("Impressive. It has astonished me"). Archduke Charles, Duke of Teschen, said about this painting, "This is the most beautiful panorama I have ever seen." The many later guests who have visited the panorama include Pope John Paul II; Beatrix, the Queen of the Netherlands; and Czesław Miłosz, winner of the 1980 Nobel Prize for Literature.

== Gallery ==
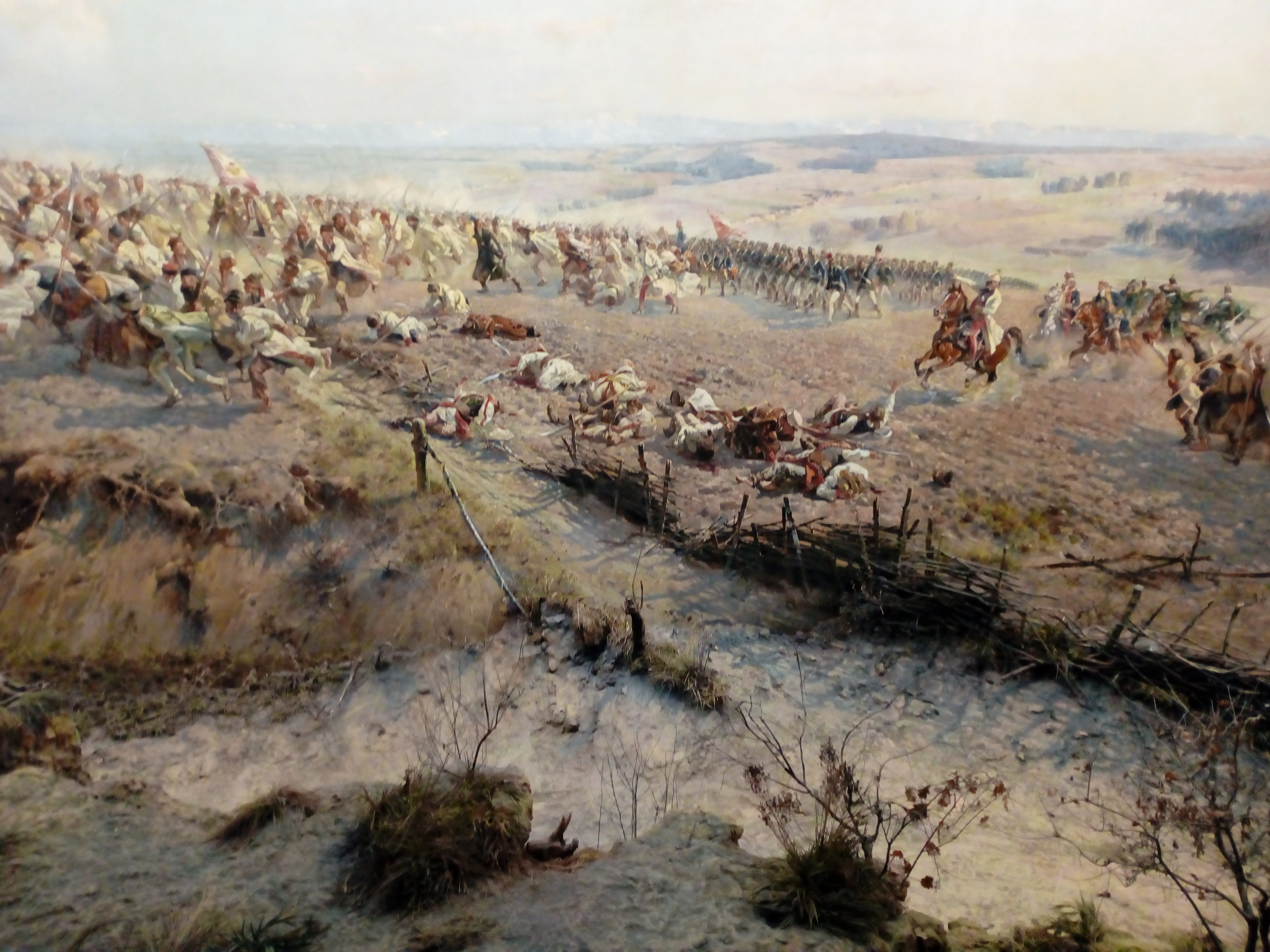

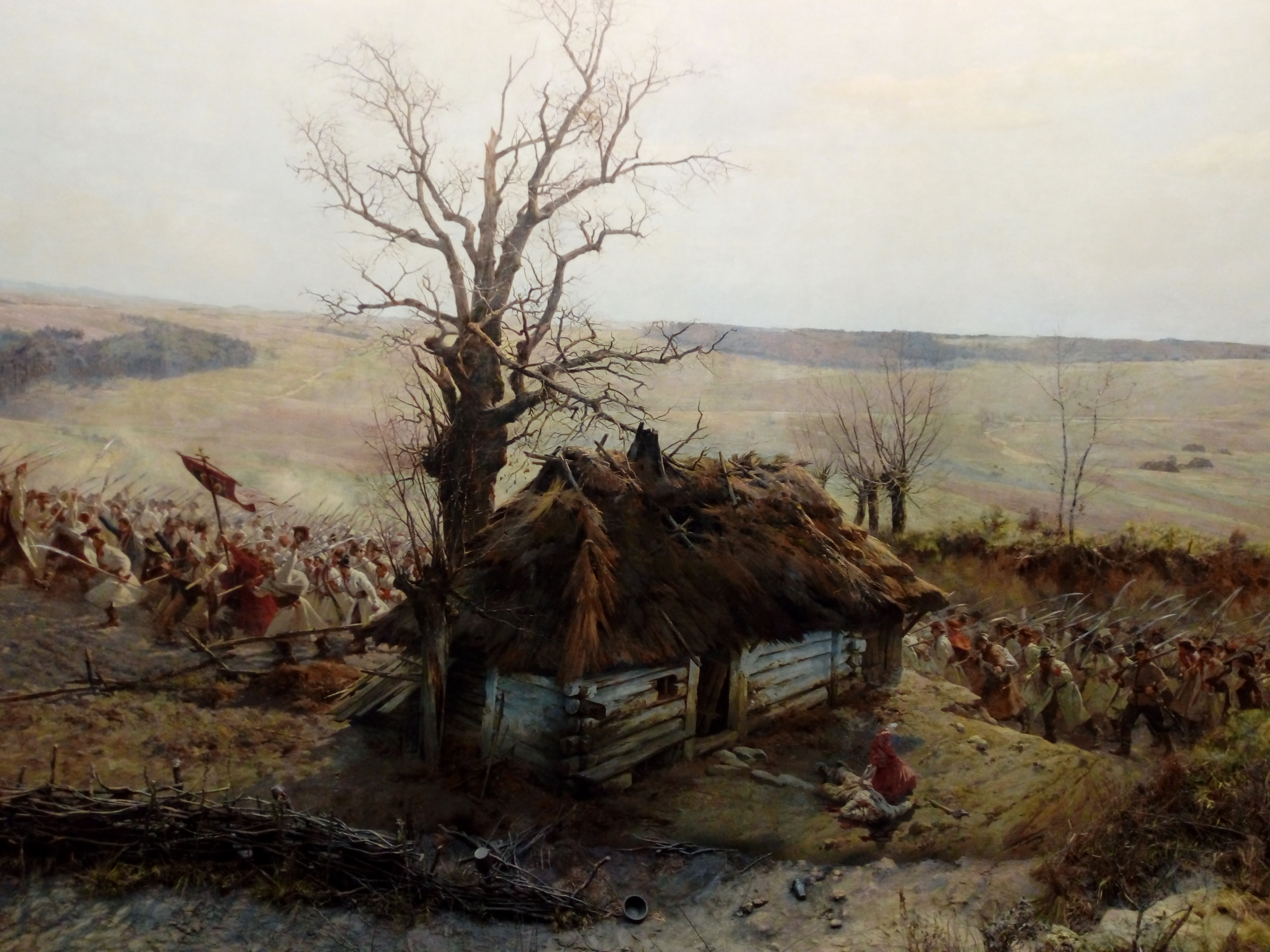

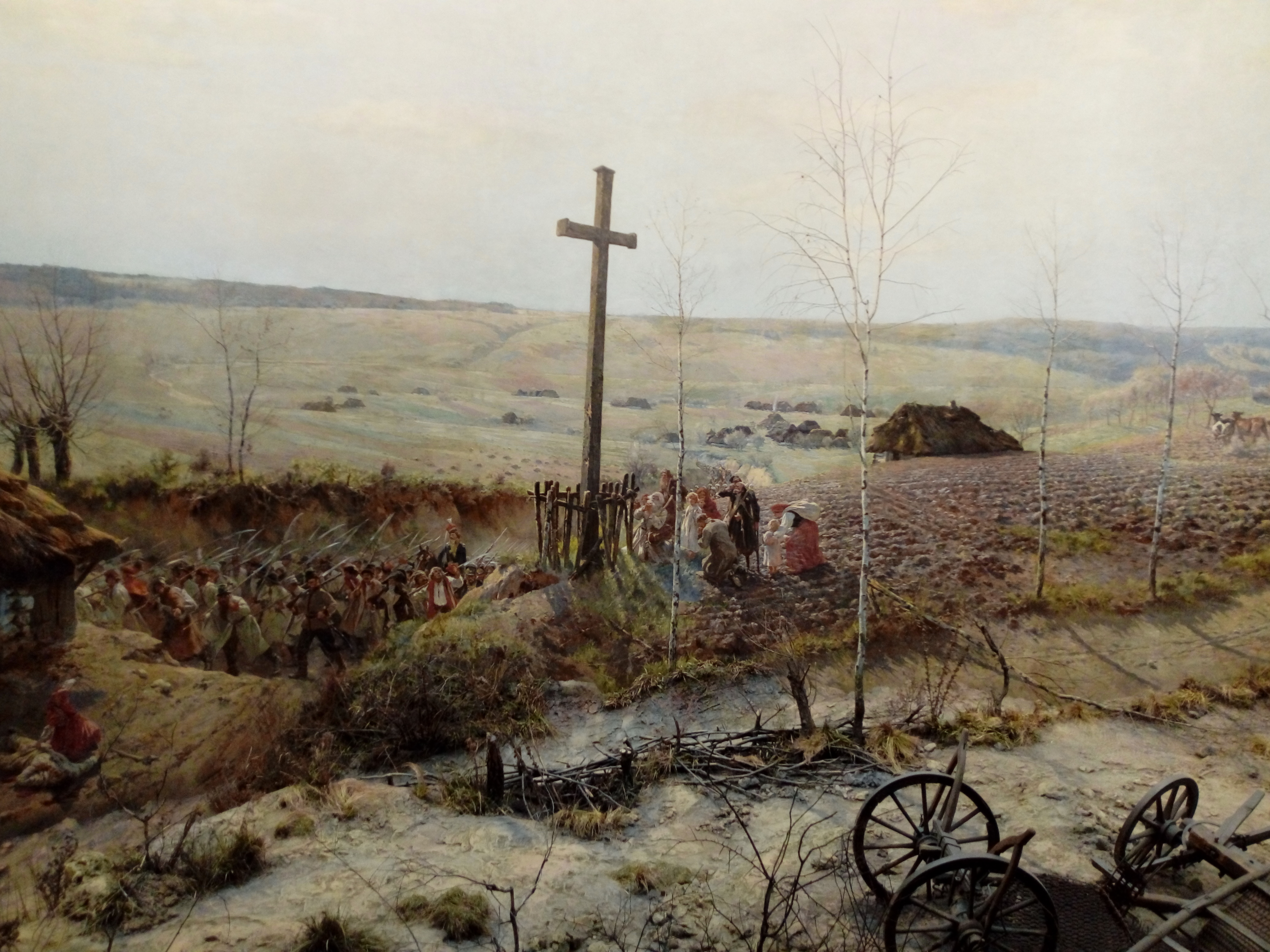

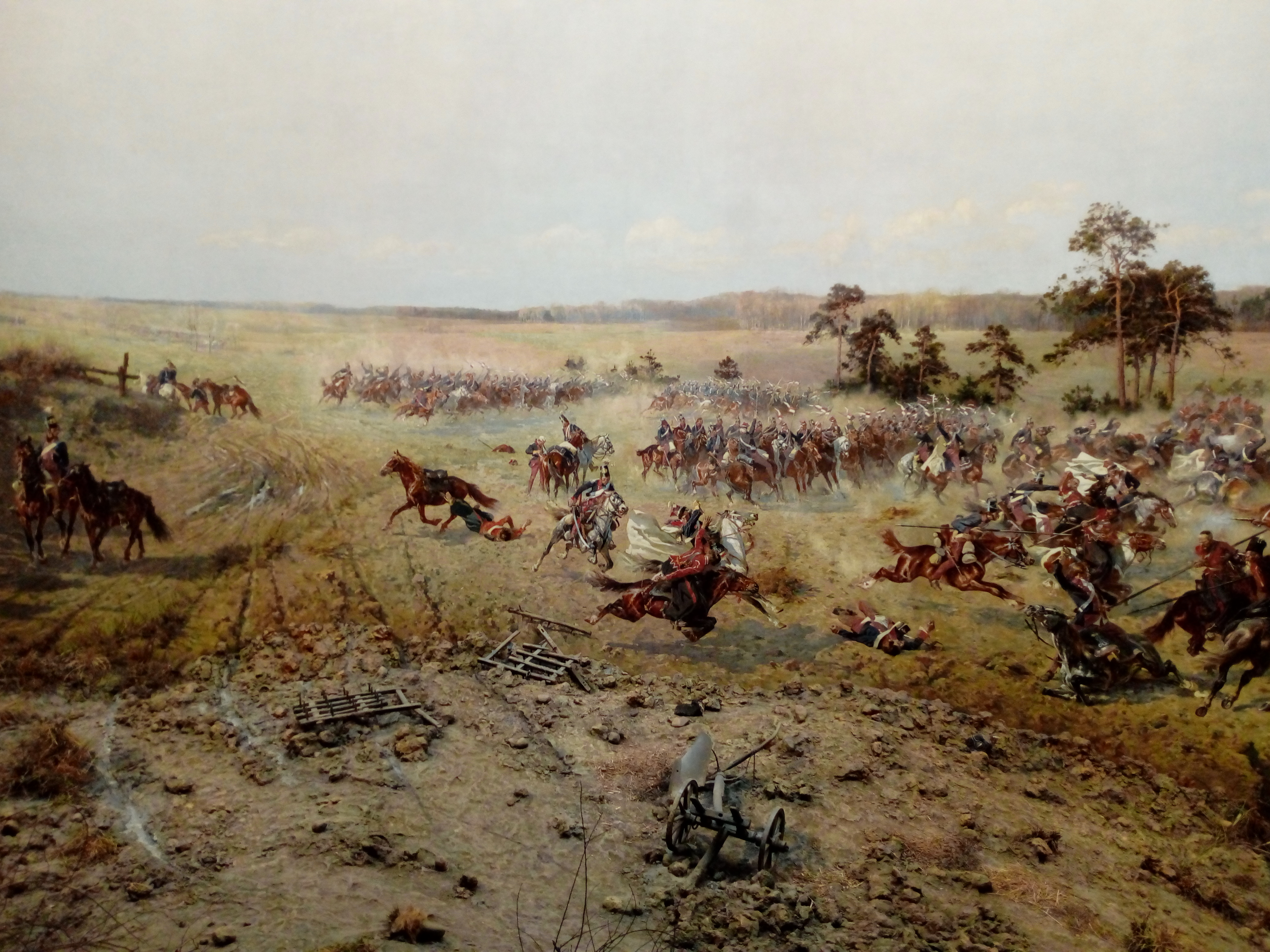

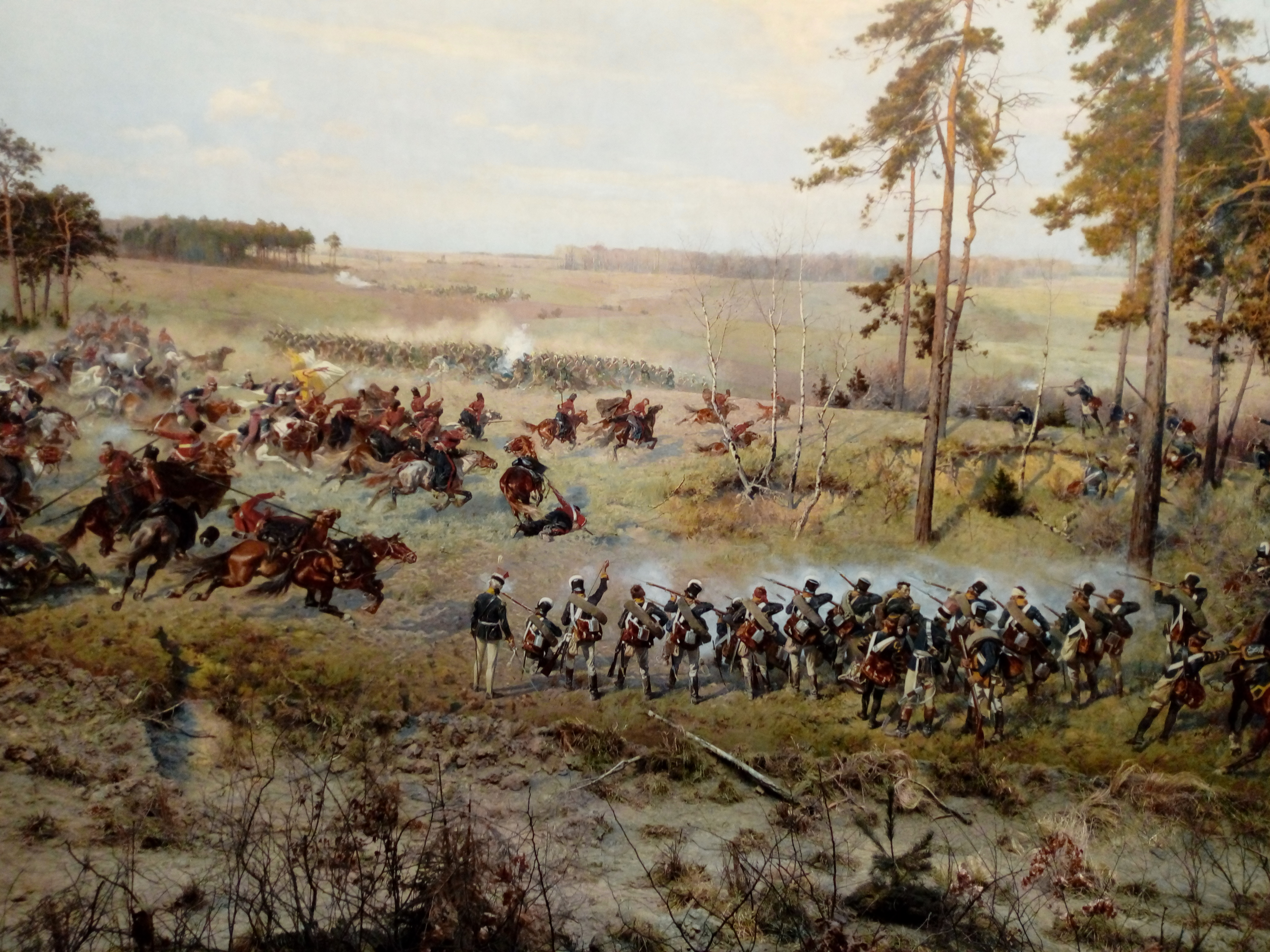

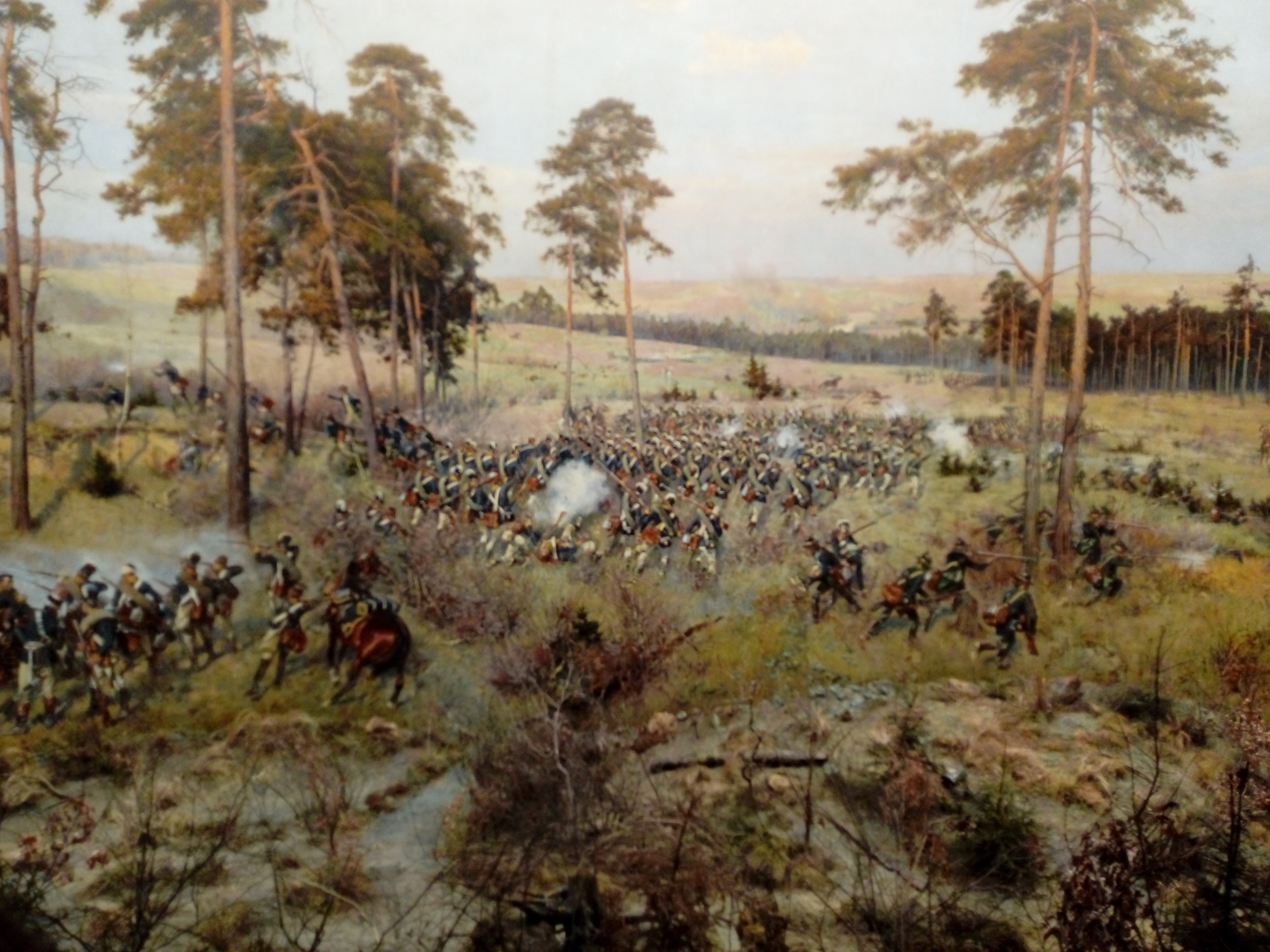

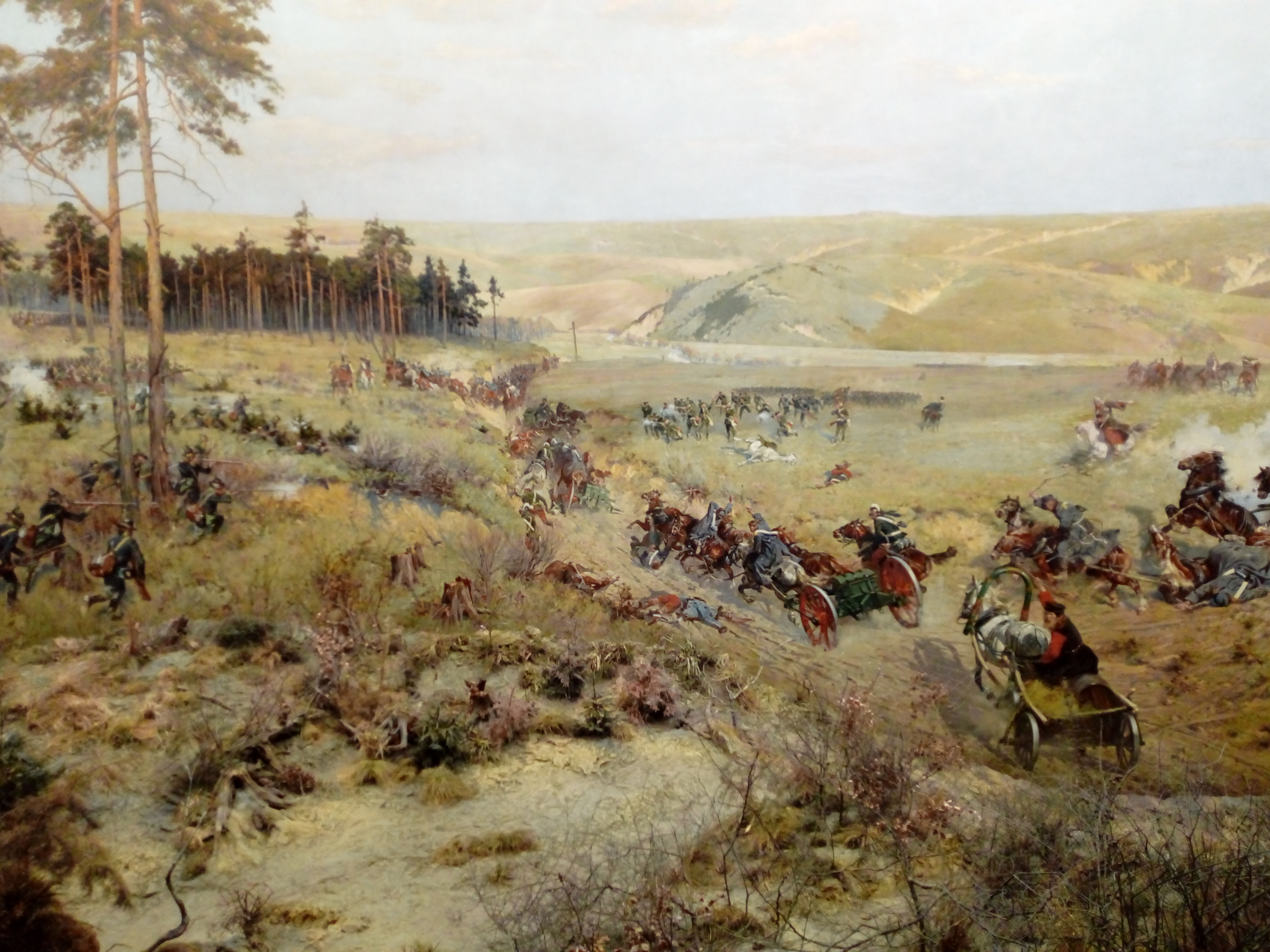

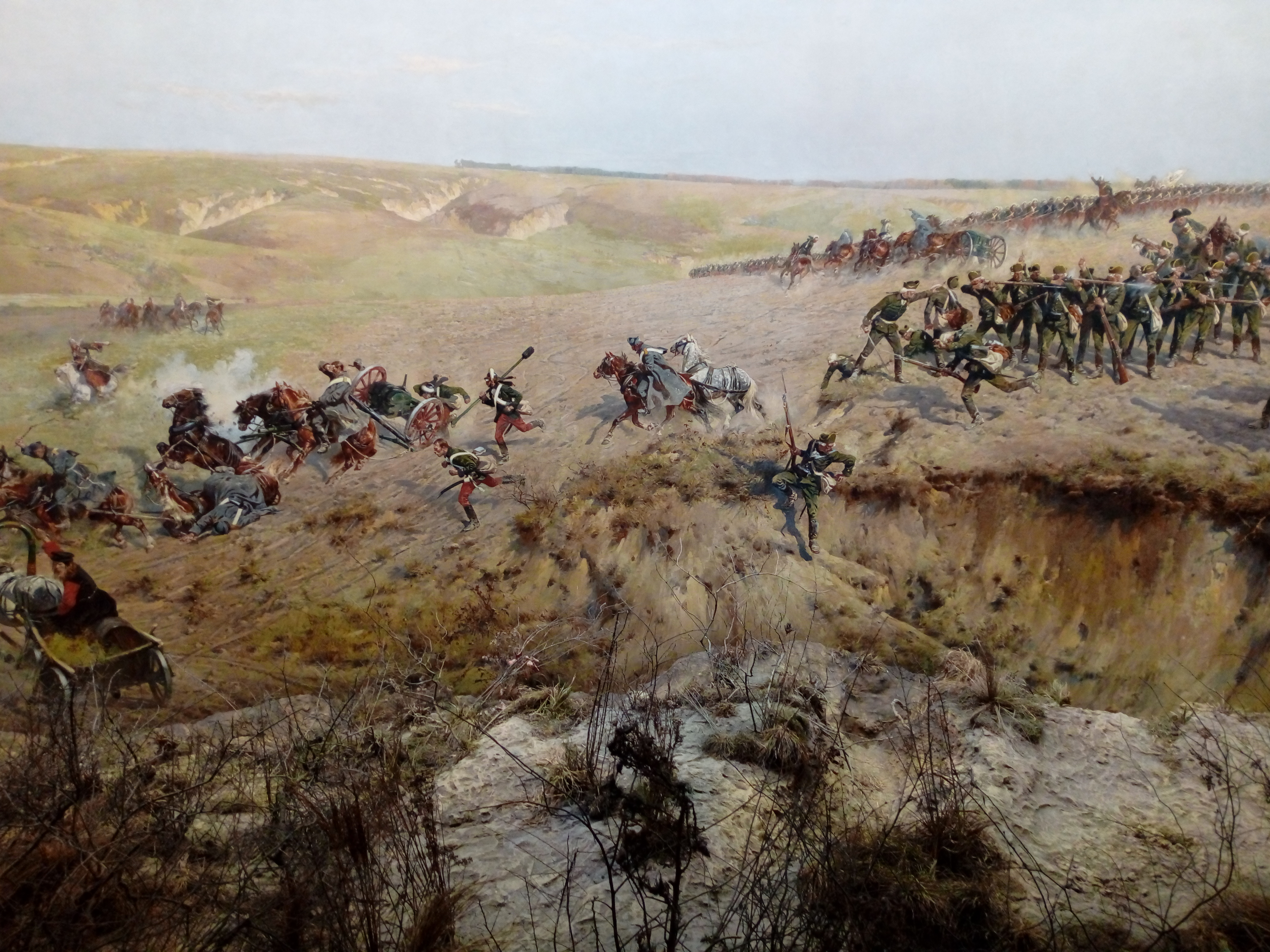

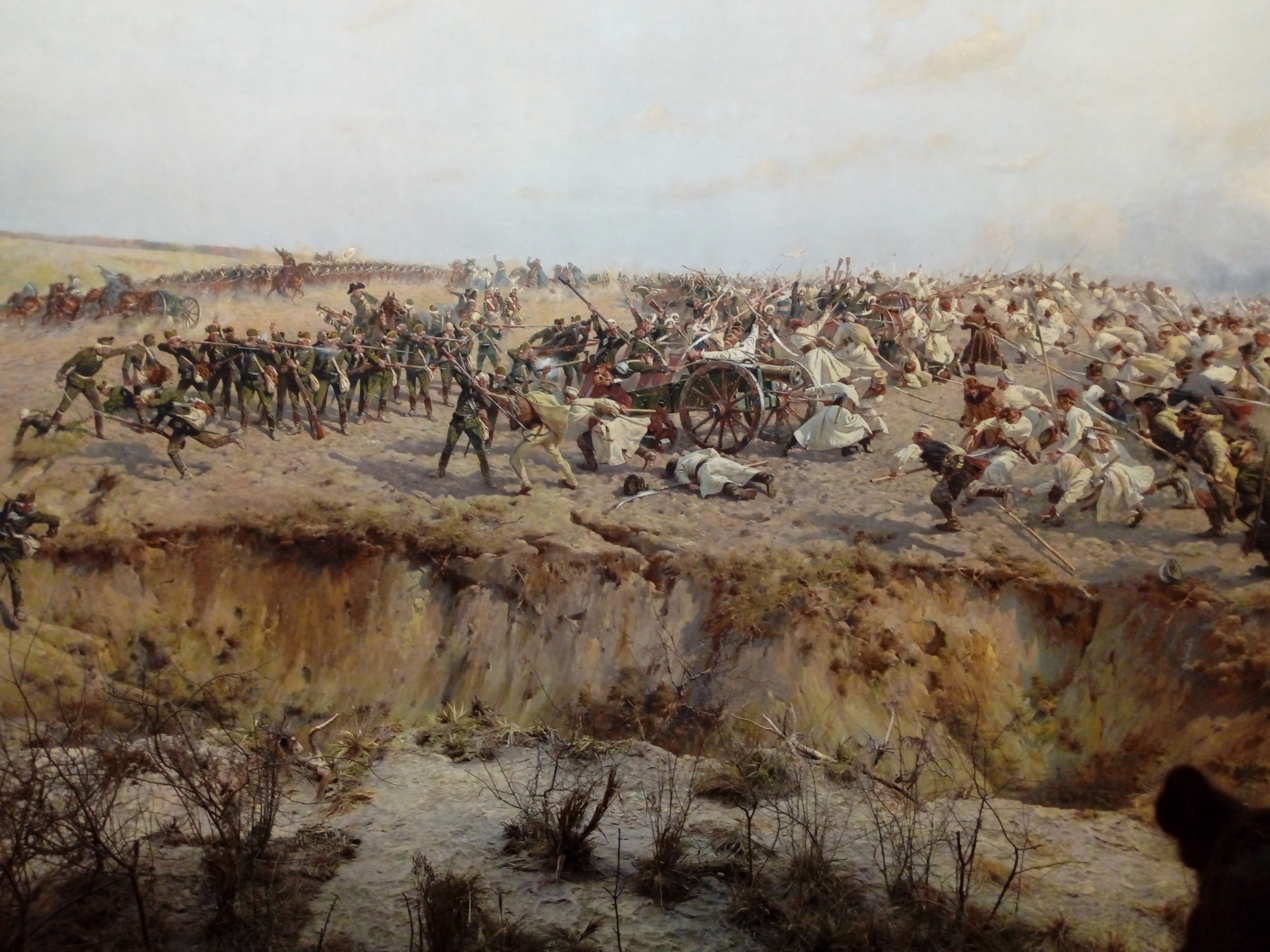

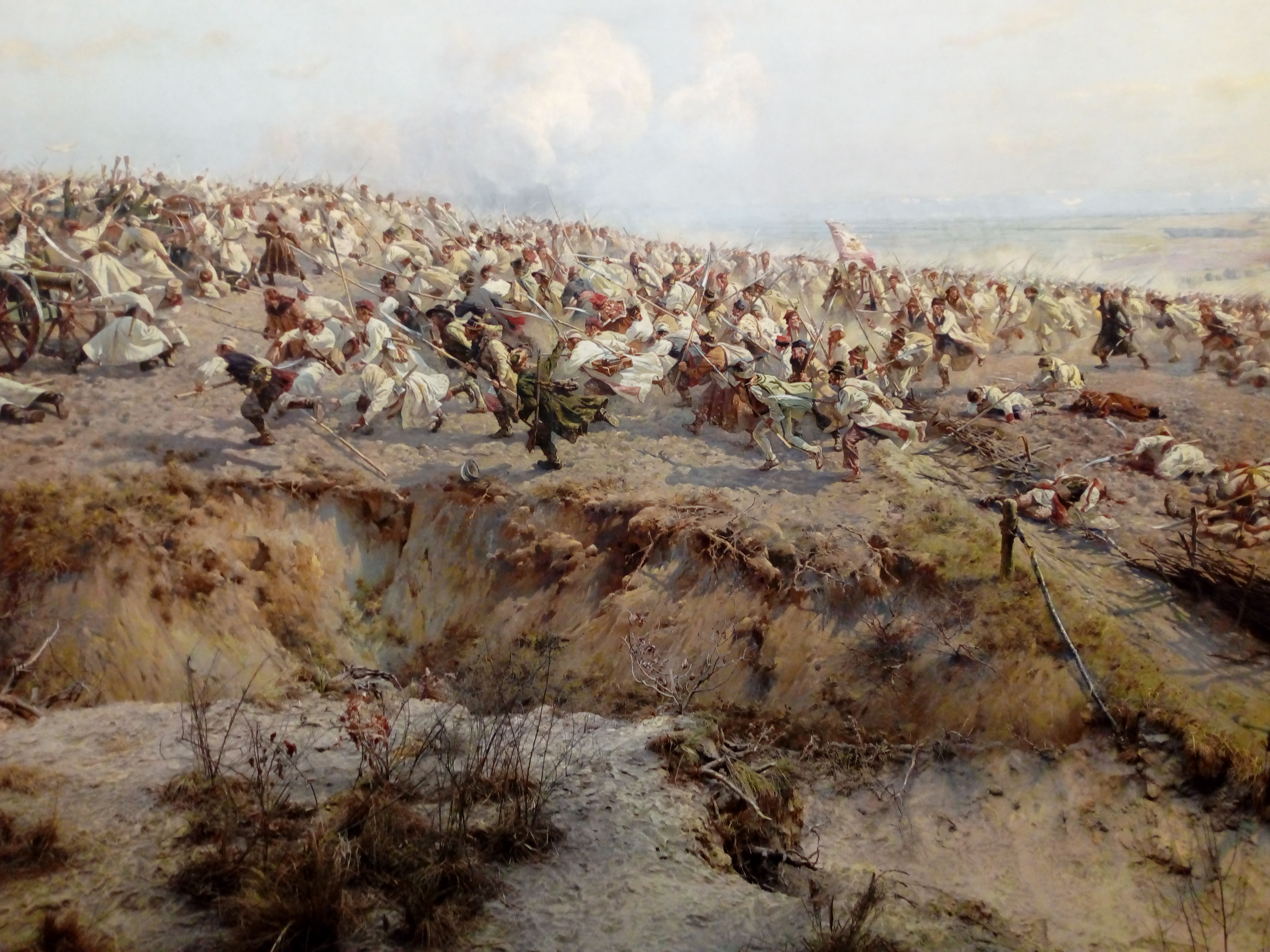

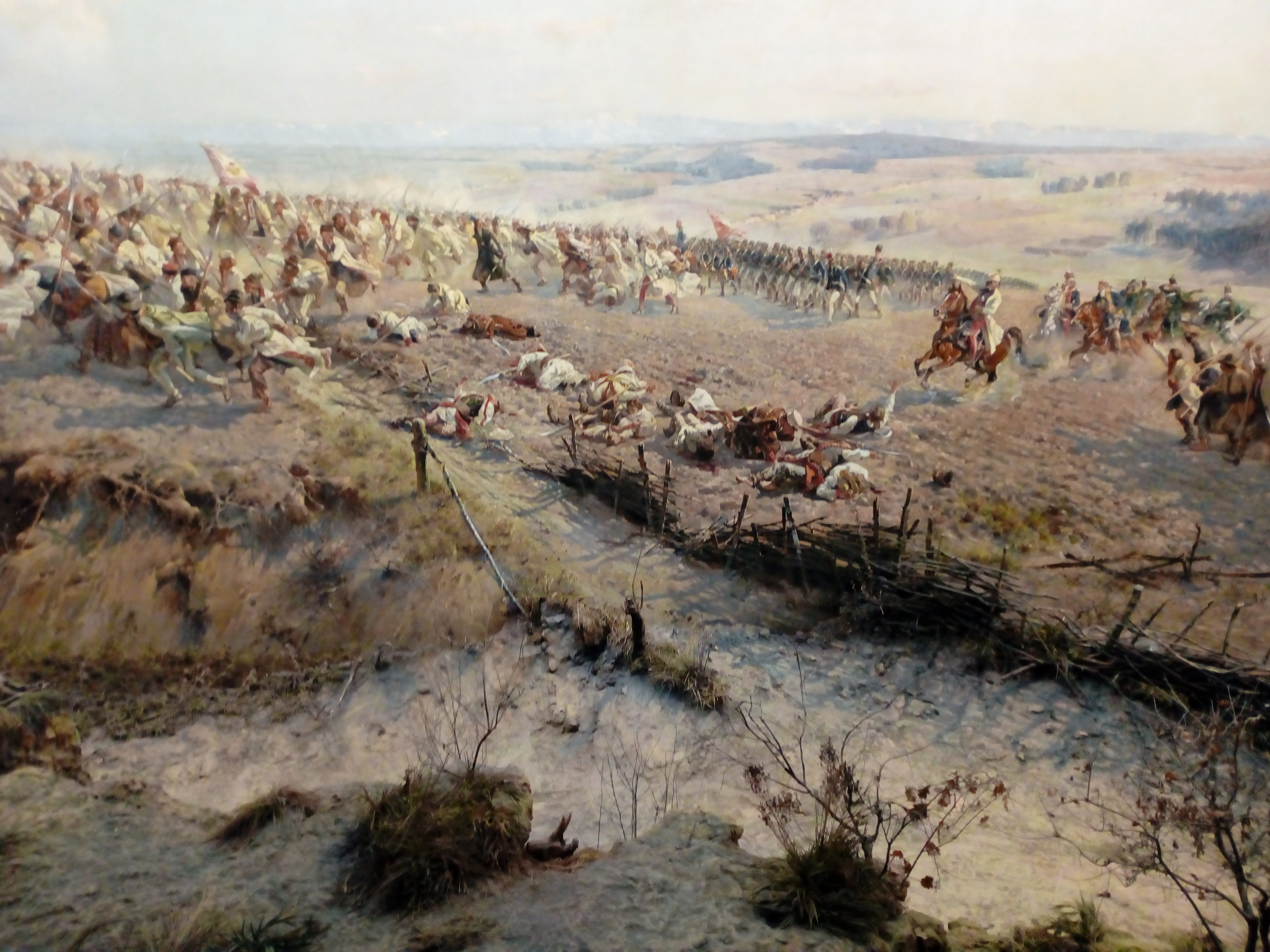

== Bibliography ==
- (Polish, English, German) Józef Piątek, Małgorzata Dolistowska, "Panorama racławicka", Wrocław 1988, ISBN 83-04-02757-7
- (Polish, English, German, French) Romuald Nowak "Panorama racławicka", Muzeum Narodowe we Wrocławiu 1999/2010, ISBN 978-83-86766-41-3
- (Polish) Magdalena Irek-Koszerna "Panorama Racławicka piórem i pędzlem", Wydawnictwo Zet 2010 ISBN 978-83-62013-38-8
- (Polish) Krystyna Tyszkowska "Panorama Racławicka : 90 lat niezwykłych dziejów", ISBN 83-03-01493-5
- (Polish) Józef Grabski "Mała Panorama Racławicka Wojciecha Kossaka i Jana Styki", 2002 IRSA Publishing House, ISBN 978-83-915130-0-2
- (Polish) Franciszek Ziejka, "Panorama Racławicka", Wydawnictwo: K.A.W. 1984, ISBN 83-03-00206-6

== See also ==
- International Panorama Council
