= Jan Styka =

Polish artist (1858-1925)

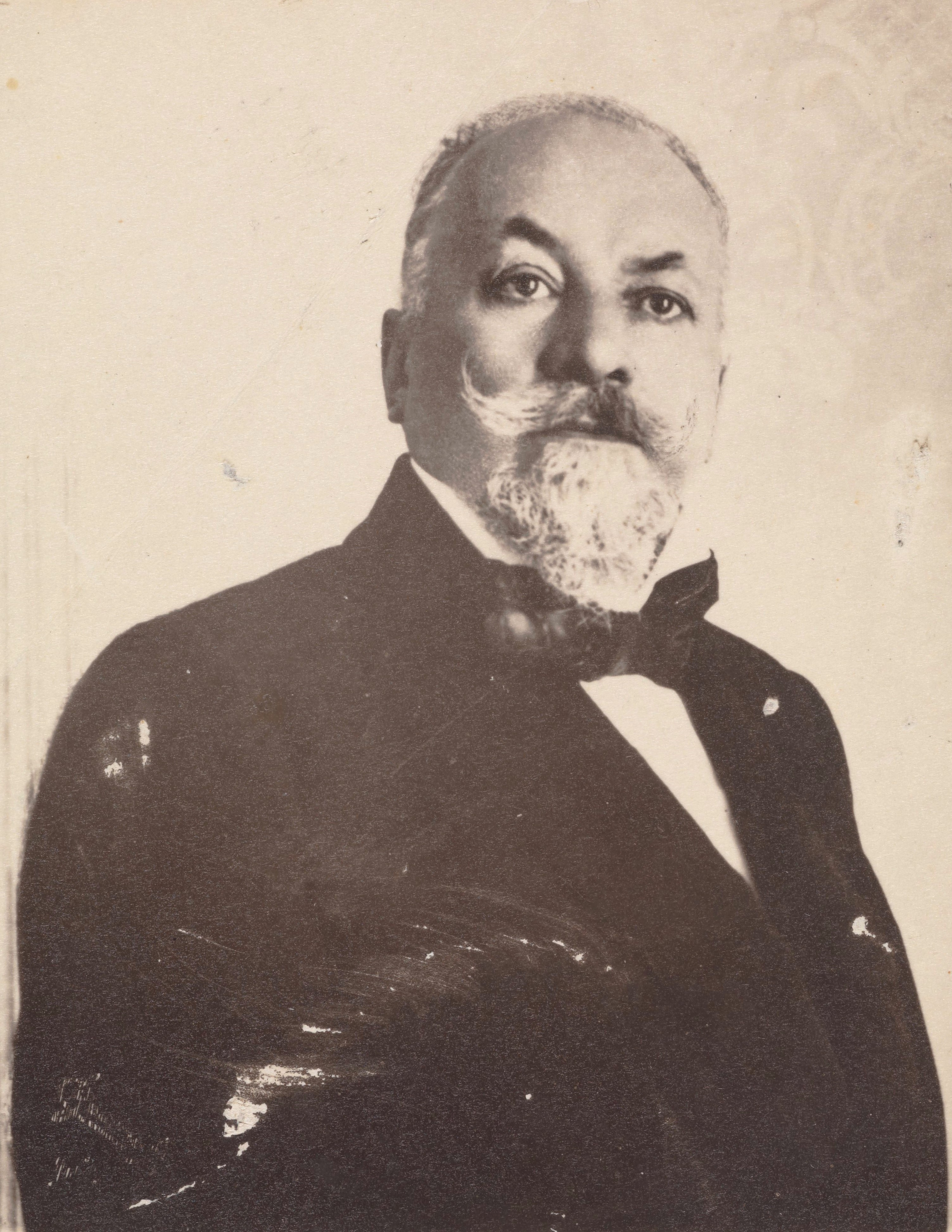
- Jan Styka, 1905
- Born: 8 April 1858; Lemberg, Austrian Poland
- Died: 11 April 1925 (aged 67); Rome, Italy
- Known for: Painting
- Notable work: The Racławice Panorama, 1894; Transylvania Panorama, 1897

Jan Styka (April 8, 1858 – April 11, 1925) was a Polish painter noted for producing large historical, battle-piece, and Christian religious panoramas. He was also illustrator and poet. Known also as a great patriotic speaker - his speeches were printed in 1915 under the French title L'ame de la Pologne (The Soul of Poland).

== Biography ==
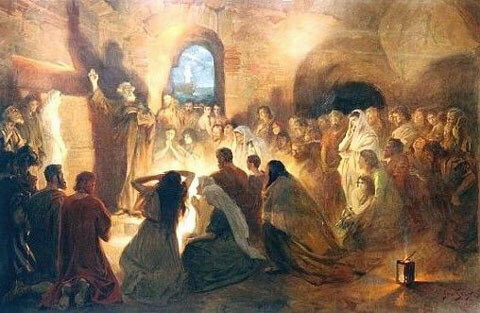
Saint Peter Preaching the Gospel in the Catacombs by Jan Styka

The son of a Czech officer in Austria-Hungary, Styka attended school in his native Lemberg (Polish: Lwów, now Lviv) then studied at the Academy of Fine Arts in Vienna, Austria following which he took up residence in Kraków in 1882 where he studied historical painting under Jan Matejko. Next, he returned to Lviv and opened there a workshop. Here, together with celebrated Polish historical painter Wojciech Kossak, they created his most famous work in Poland – The Racławice Panorama, a 15x114 meter cycloramic painting now on display as part of the National Museum in Wrocław. Later he travelled to Italy for a short time before moving to France where the great art movements at Montmartre and Montparnasse were taking shape and where he would spend a large part of his life.

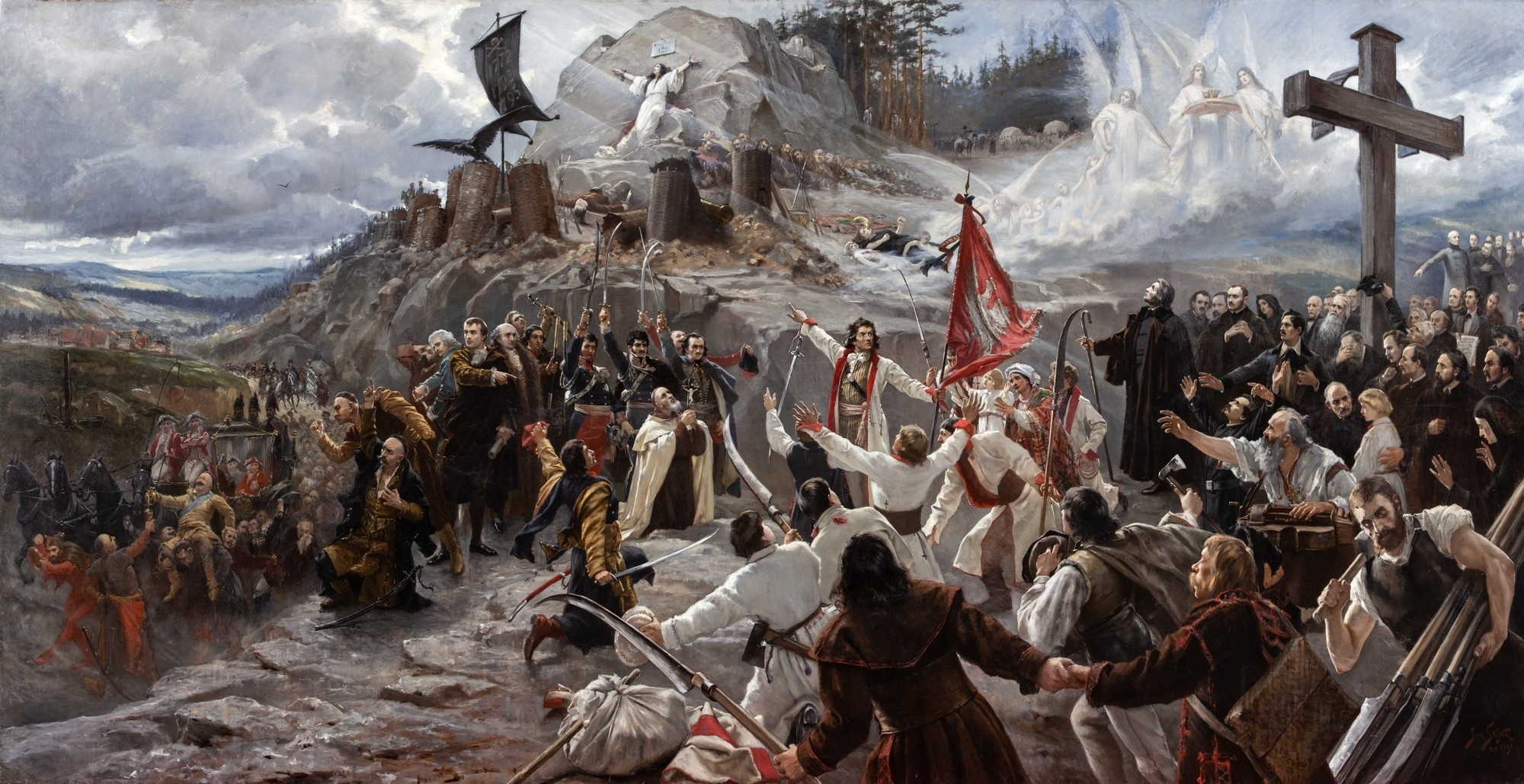
Polonia by Jan Styka, 1891

In commemoration of the 100th anniversary of the May 3rd Constitution, Styka pained the monumental painting Polonia, which was the centerpiece of Constitution Day celebrations in 1891 in Lviv.

Among Styka's important works is the large scene of Saint Peter preaching the Gospel in the Catacombs (seen here) painted in Paris in 1902. Besides The Racławice Panorama, his renowned panoramas include Bem in Siedmiogrod (1897) and The Martydrom of Christians in Nero's Circus (1897).

== Personal life ==
Sons Tadeusz "Tade" Styka (1889–1954) and Adam Styka (1890–1959) were both painters.

Styka died in 1925 and was buried in Rome. However, in 1959 Hubert Eaton arranged with Styka's family for his remains to be brought to the United States for interment in the "Hall of The Immortals" at Forest Lawn cemetery.

== The Crucifixion ==
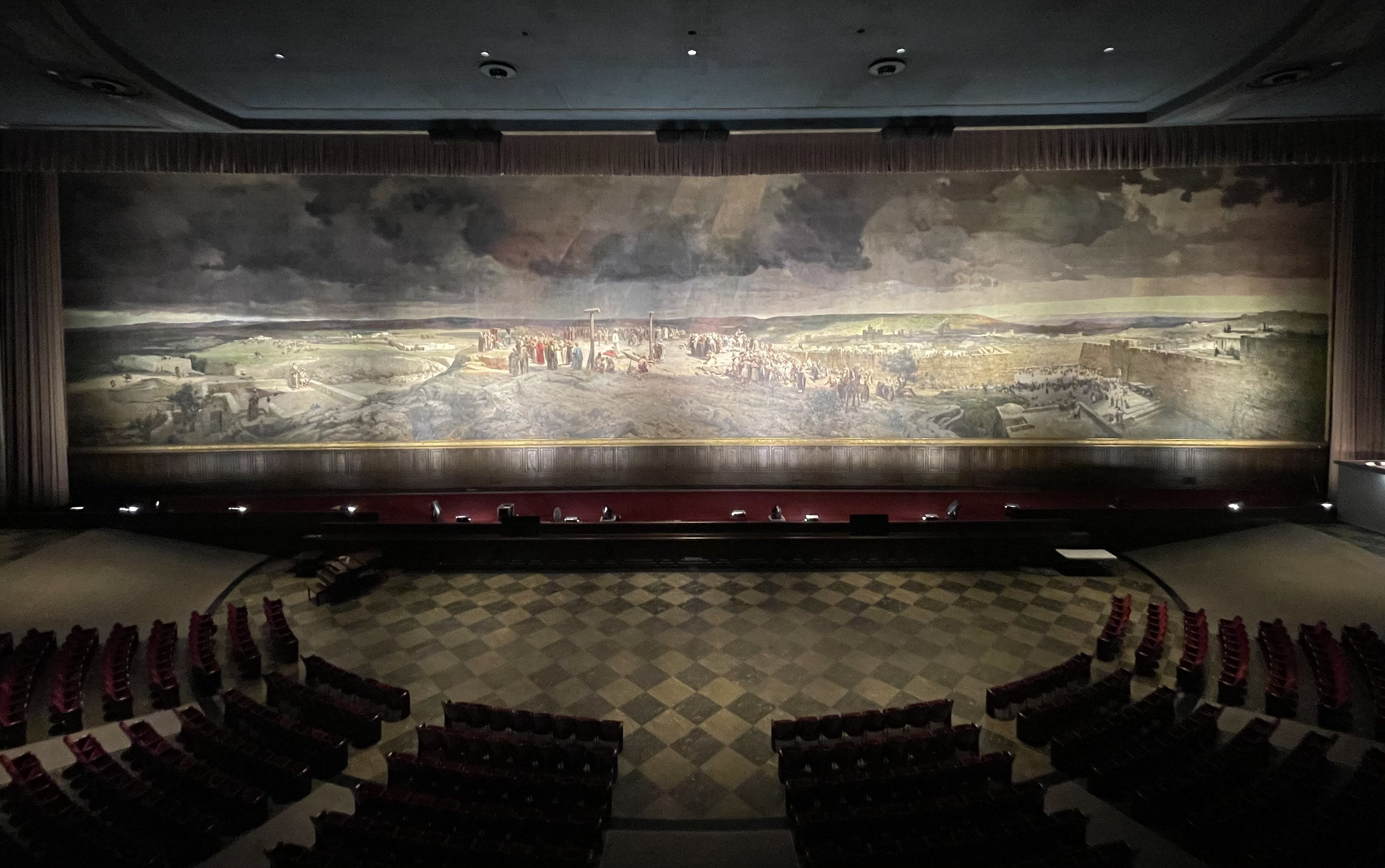
Wide view of Hall of Crucifixion-Resurrection

In 1910 Styka painted a portrait of esteemed pianist and Polish statesman, Ignacy Jan Paderewski, which is now at the National Museum of Poland in Poznań. Previously, near the end of the 19th century, Paderewski had commissioned Styka to paint what would become his most famous work internationally. Originally entitled "Golgotha" (the Aramaic name for the site of Christ's crucifixion), the painting became known simply as The Crucifixion. This piece is an enormous panorama standing 195 feet (59 m) long by 45 feet (14 m) in height.

Upon its commission in 1894, Styka travelled to Jerusalem to prepare sketches, and to Rome, where his palette was blessed by Pope Leo XIII. The painting was unveiled in Warsaw to great success on June 22, 1897. It was shown in many of the great cities of Europe, before making its way to America, to join the 1904 St. Louis Exposition. The painting was seized when Styka's American partners failed to pay the customs taxes, and was considered lost for nearly forty years. In 1944 the painting was found, rolled around a telephone pole and badly damaged, having languished in the basement of the Chicago Civic Opera Company for decades.

Acquired by American businessman, Hubert Eaton, the painting was restored by Jan Styka's son, artist Adam Styka. It is on display in the Hall of the Crucifixion at Forest Lawn Memorial Park Cemetery in Glendale, California.

In 2005–2006 the painting underwent a massive restoration as part of Forest Lawn's centennial celebration. It currently is shown, except on Mondays, on the hour, except 1:00 p.m., from 10 a.m. to 4 p.m.. It features a new, state of the art guided light show and narrated presentation written by biblical scholar and filmmaker Timothy Kirk.

== Selected paintings ==
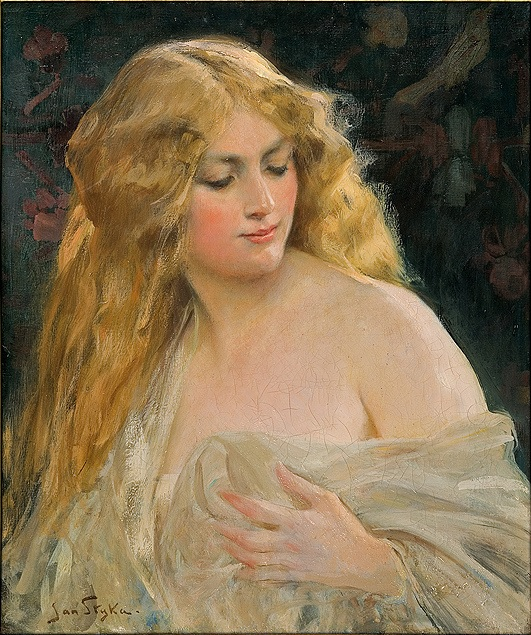
Calypso

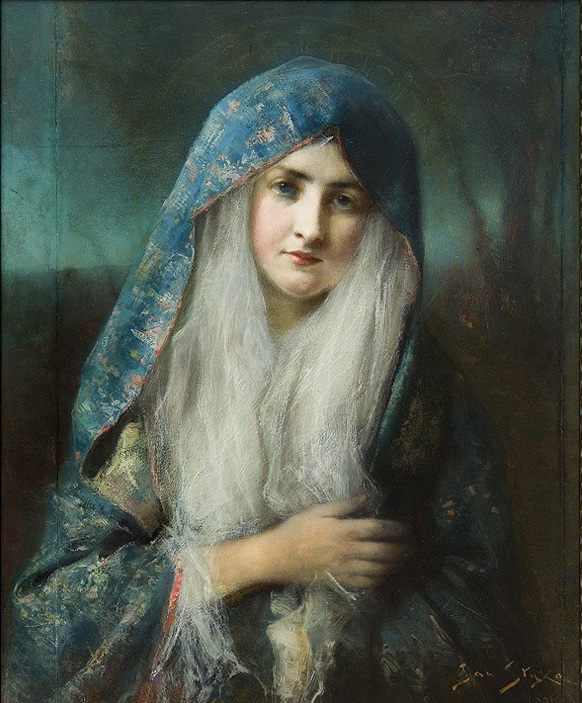
Madonna, 1906

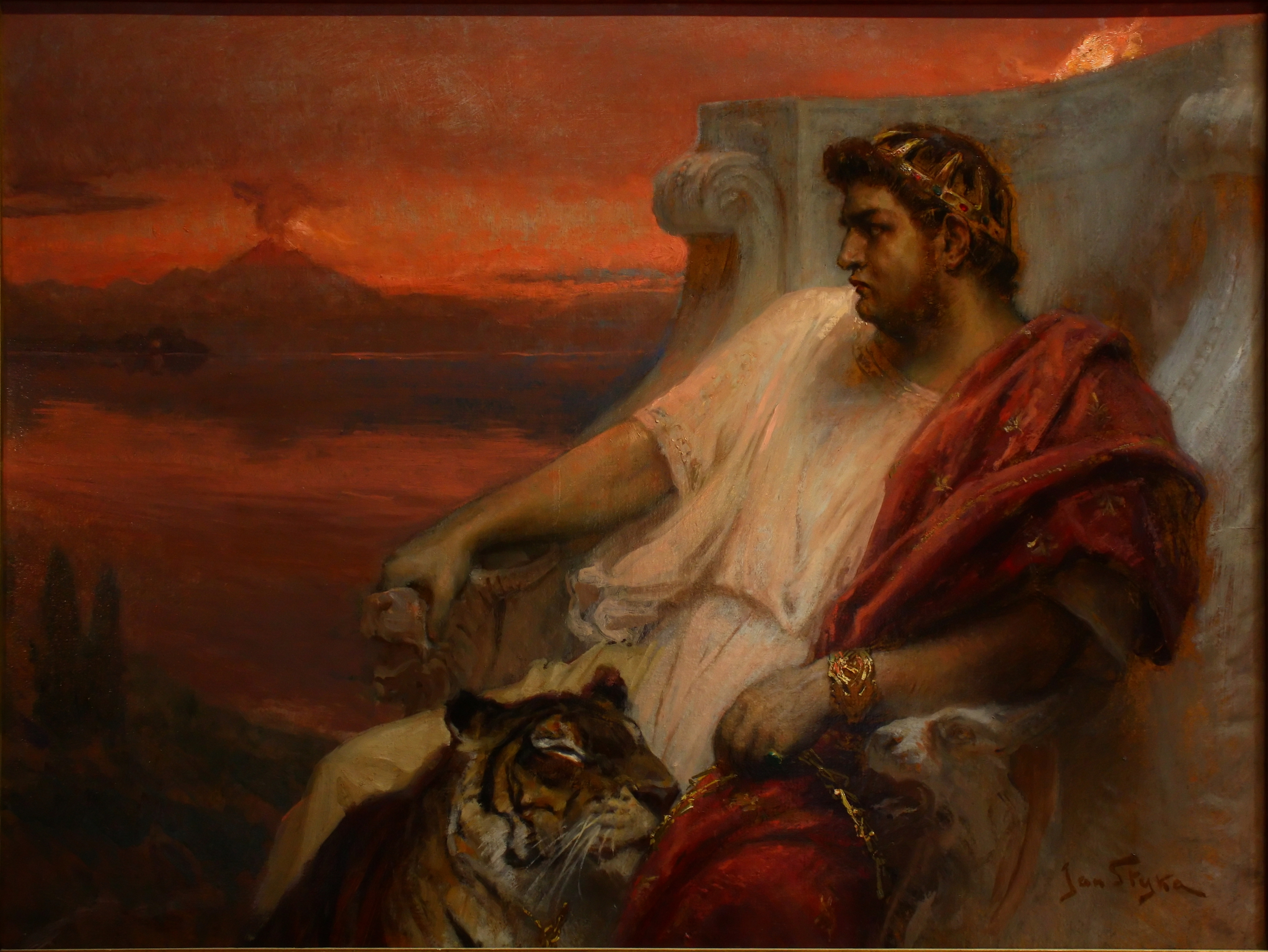
Nero at Baiae, c. 1900

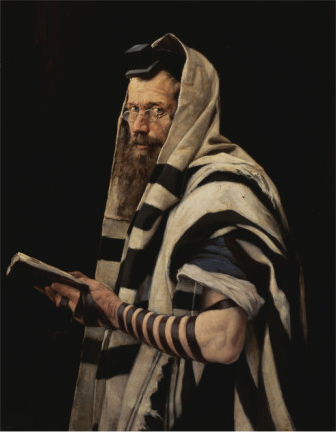
Rabbi with Tefillin, ca. 1925

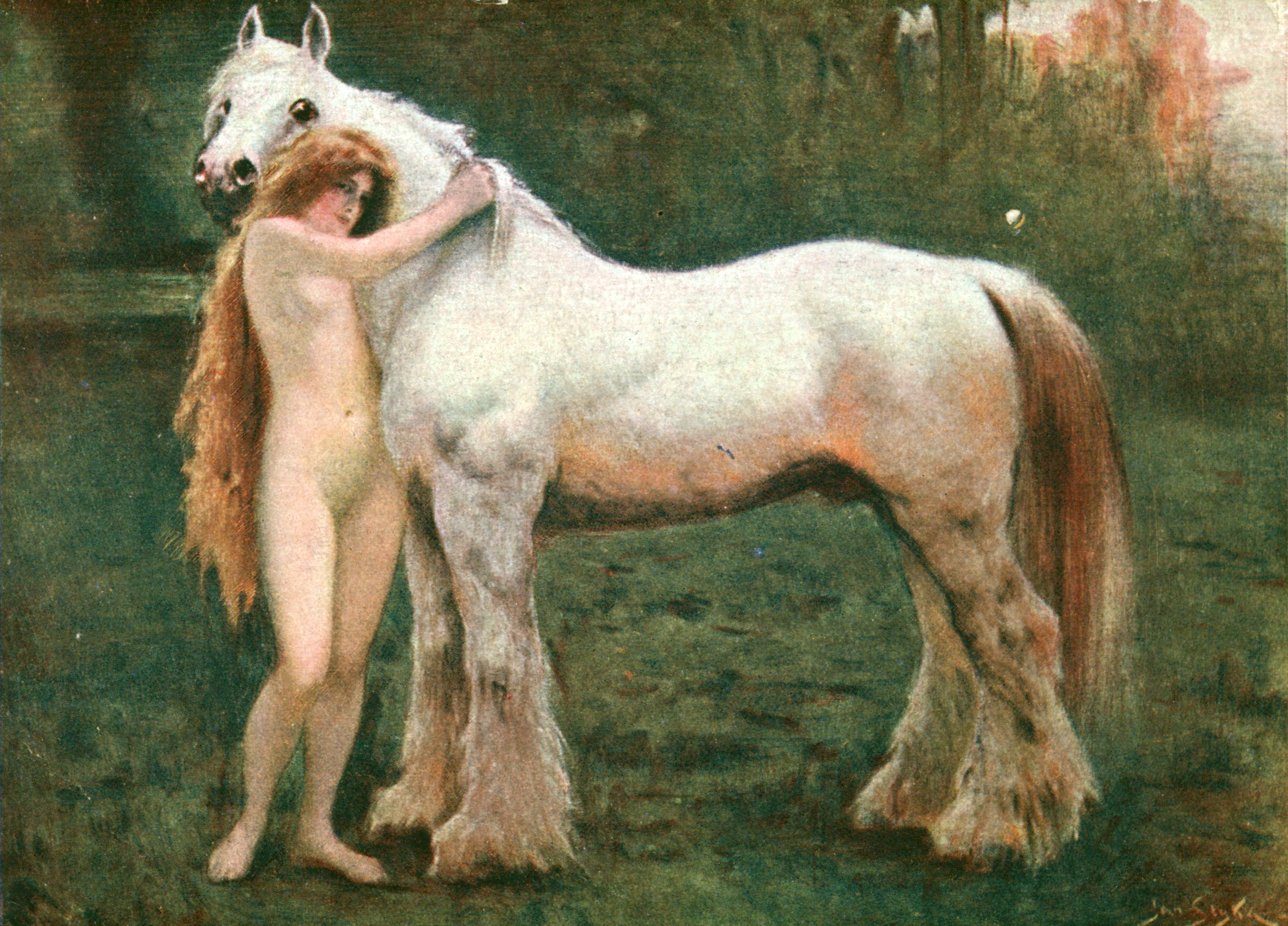
Nymph and a Horse, c. 1920

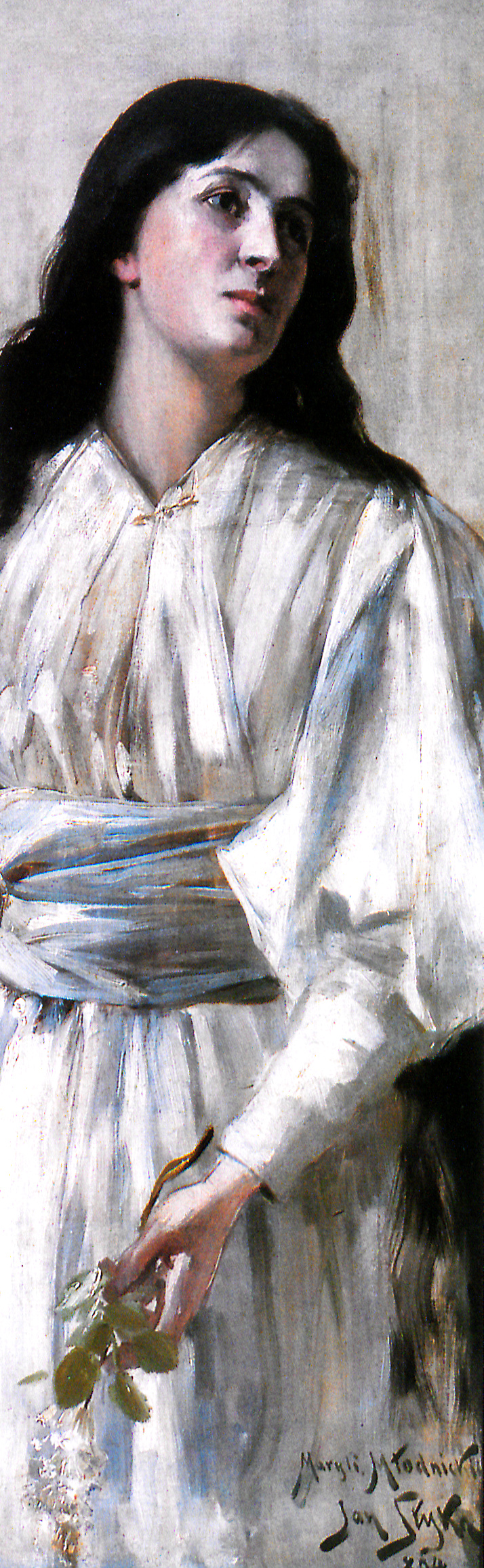
Portrait of Maryla Młodnicka-Wolska

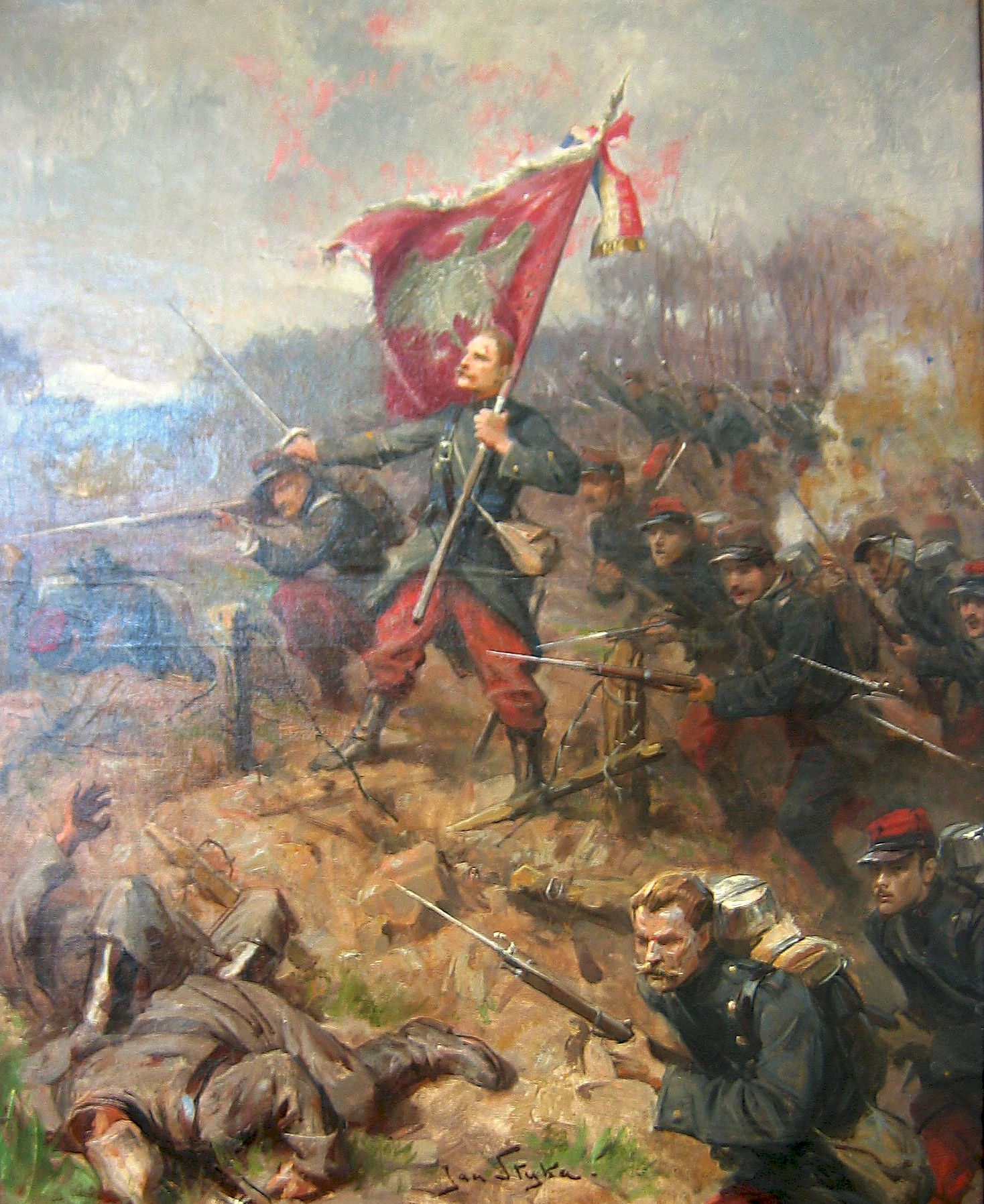
Death of Władysław Szujski in the Battle of Sillery

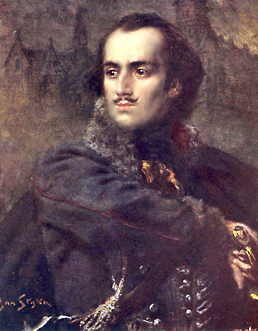
Kazimierz Pułaski, ca. 1925

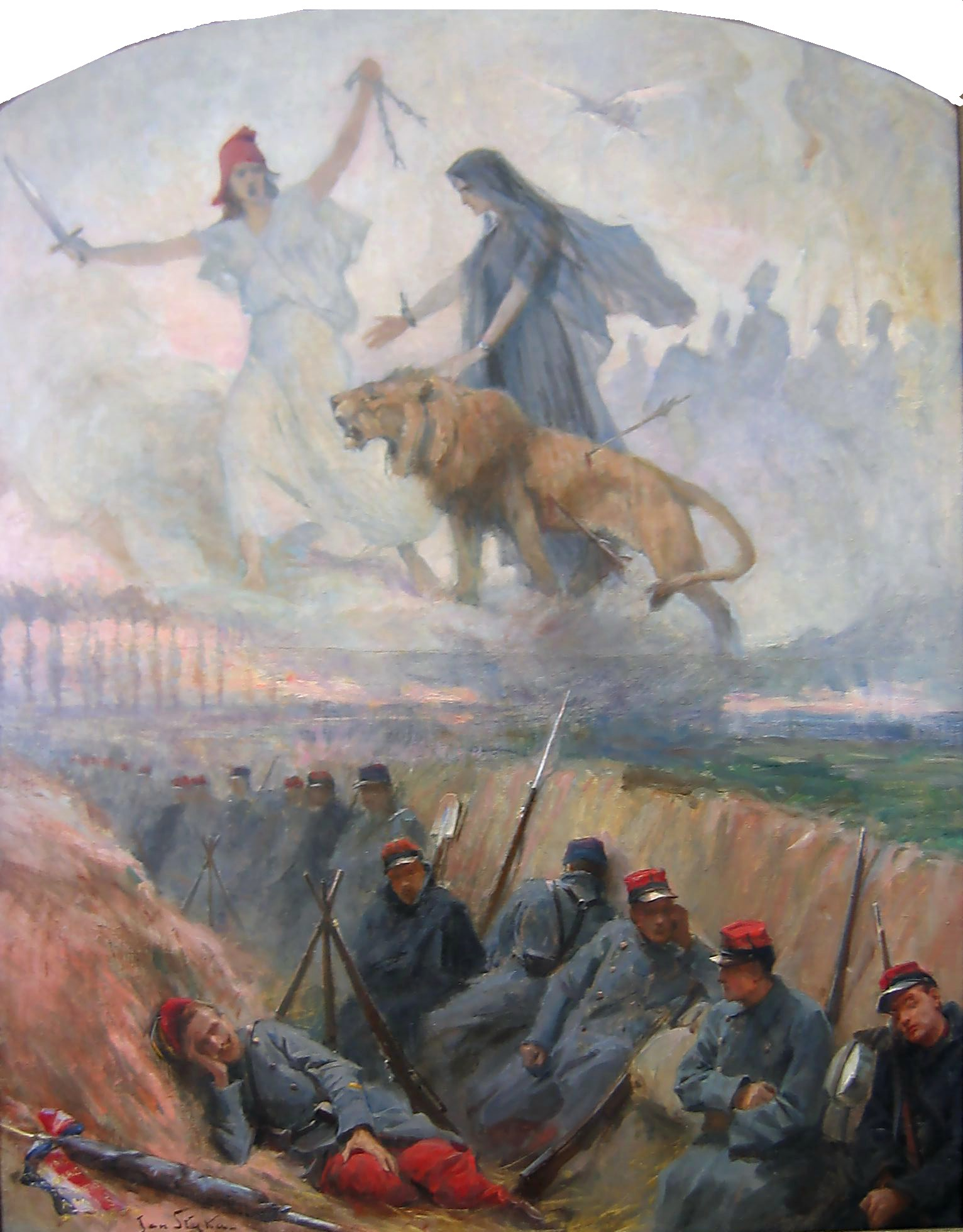
Dream of Polish Volunteers in French Trenches
