= Great Moravia =

9th-century Slavic state

Moravia Морава / Ⰿⱁⱃⰰⰲⰰ (Old Church Slavonic) Regnum Marauorum/Marahensium (Latin)
- c. 833–c. 907
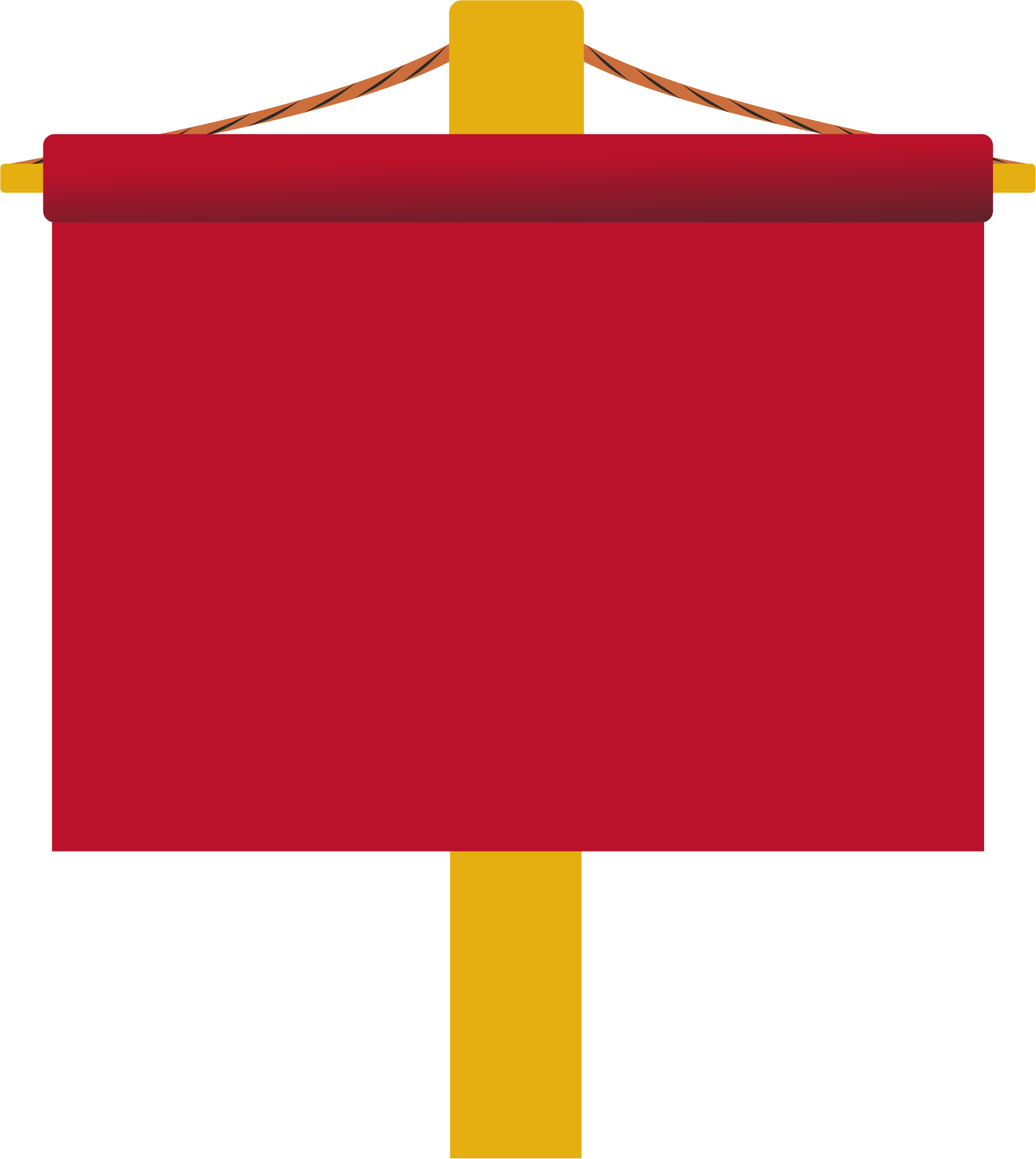
- A reconstructed banner (vexillum) based on a 9th-century image, (Note: On a 9th-century gilt belt extender found in tomb number 240, located in Mikulčice-Valy. The gravure appears clumsy, but it is the only known image of a Great Moravian flag.) with red-purple being the most likely color.

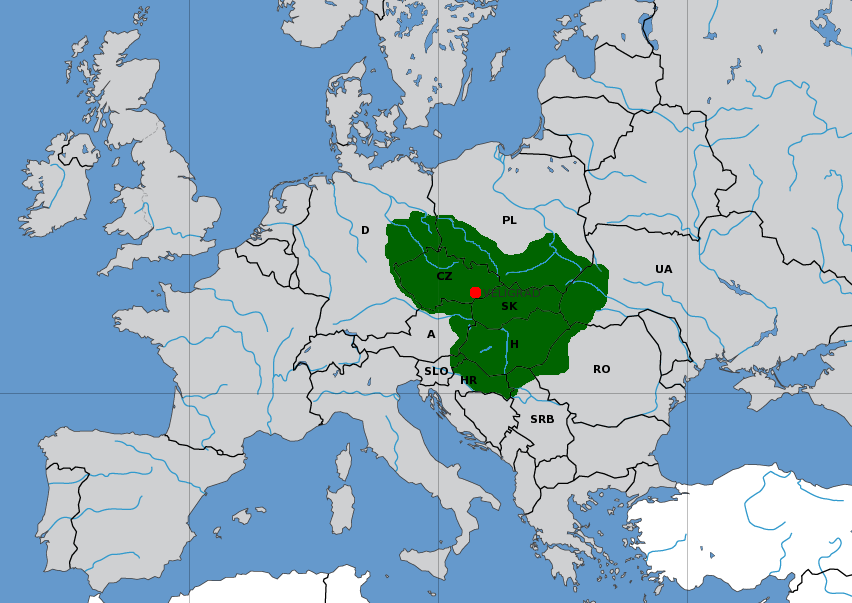
- Great Moravia at its greatest extent during the reign of Svatopluk I, with a red dot marking the approximate location of its capital
- Capital: Veligrad (possibly Mikulčice, Czech Republic)
- Common languages: Late Common Slavic (spoken); Old Church Slavonic (liturgical); Latin (religious)
- Religion: Orthodox Christianity; Latin Christianity; Slavic paganism
- Government: Monarchy (principality)
- kъnendzь or vladyka (Note: King, Ruler, in the international context also translated as Prince or Duke.)
  - before 833: Mojmír I (first)
  - 846: Rastislav
  - 871: Slavomír
  - 871: Svatopluk I
  - 894: Mojmír II
- History
  - Established: c. 833
  - Decline and fall: c. 907
Preceded by
Samo's Empire
Principality of Nitra (disputed)
Bohemian Slavs
Vistulans
Golensizi
Avar Khaganate
Succeeded by
Duchy of Bohemia
Principality of Hungary
Civitas Schinesghe
East Francia

Great Moravia, (Note: Latin: Regnum Marahensium; Greek: Μεγάλη Μοραβία, Meghálī Moravía; Czech: Velká Morava [ˈvɛlkaː ˈmorava]; Slovak: Veľká Morava [ˈvɛʎkaː ˈmɔrava]; Polish: Wielkie Morawy; German: Großmähren) or simply Moravia, was the first major state that was predominantly West Slavic to emerge in the area of Central Europe, possibly including territories which are today part of the Czech Republic, Slovakia, Hungary, Austria, Germany, Poland, Romania, Croatia, Serbia, Ukraine and Slovenia. The formations preceding it in these territories were Samo's tribal union (631–658) and the Pannonian Avar state (567–822).

Centered on the Morava River – which gave the realm its name – the core encompassed today’s Moravia in the eastern Czech Republic and adjacent western Slovakia. The kingdom saw the rise of the first-ever Slavic literary culture in the Old Church Slavonic language as well as the expansion of Christianity, first via missionaries from East Francia, and later after the arrival of Saints Cyril and Methodius in 863 and the creation of the Glagolitic alphabet, the first alphabet dedicated to a Slavic language. Glagolitic was subsequently replaced by the Cyrillic alphabet created in the First Bulgarian Empire.

Although the borders of this empire cannot be exactly determined, Moravia reached its largest territorial extent under Prince Svatopluk I (Slovak: Svätopluk), who ruled from 870 to 894. Separatism and internal conflicts emerging after Svatopluk's death contributed to the fall of Great Moravia, which was overrun by the Hungarians, who then included the territory of present-day Slovakia in their domains. The exact date of Moravia's collapse is unknown, but it occurred between 902 and 907.

Moravia experienced significant cultural development under King Rastislav, with the arrival in 863 of the mission of Saints Cyril and Methodius. After his request for missionaries had been refused in Rome, Rastislav asked the Byzantine emperor to send a "teacher" (učiteľ) to introduce literacy and a legal system (pravьda) to Great Moravia. The request was granted. The missionary brothers Cyril and Methodius introduced a system of writing (the Glagolitic alphabet) and Slavonic liturgy, the latter eventually formally approved by Pope Adrian II. The Glagolitic script was probably invented by Cyril himself and the language he used for his translations of religious texts and his original literary creation was based on the Eastern South Slavic dialect he and his brother Methodius knew from their native Thessaloniki. Old Church Slavonic, therefore, differed somewhat from the local Slavic dialect of Great Moravia which was the ancestral idiom to the later dialects spoken in Moravia and western Slovakia. Later, the disciples of Cyril and Methodius were expelled from Great Moravia by King Svatopluk I, who re-oriented the Empire to Western Christianity.

== Name ==
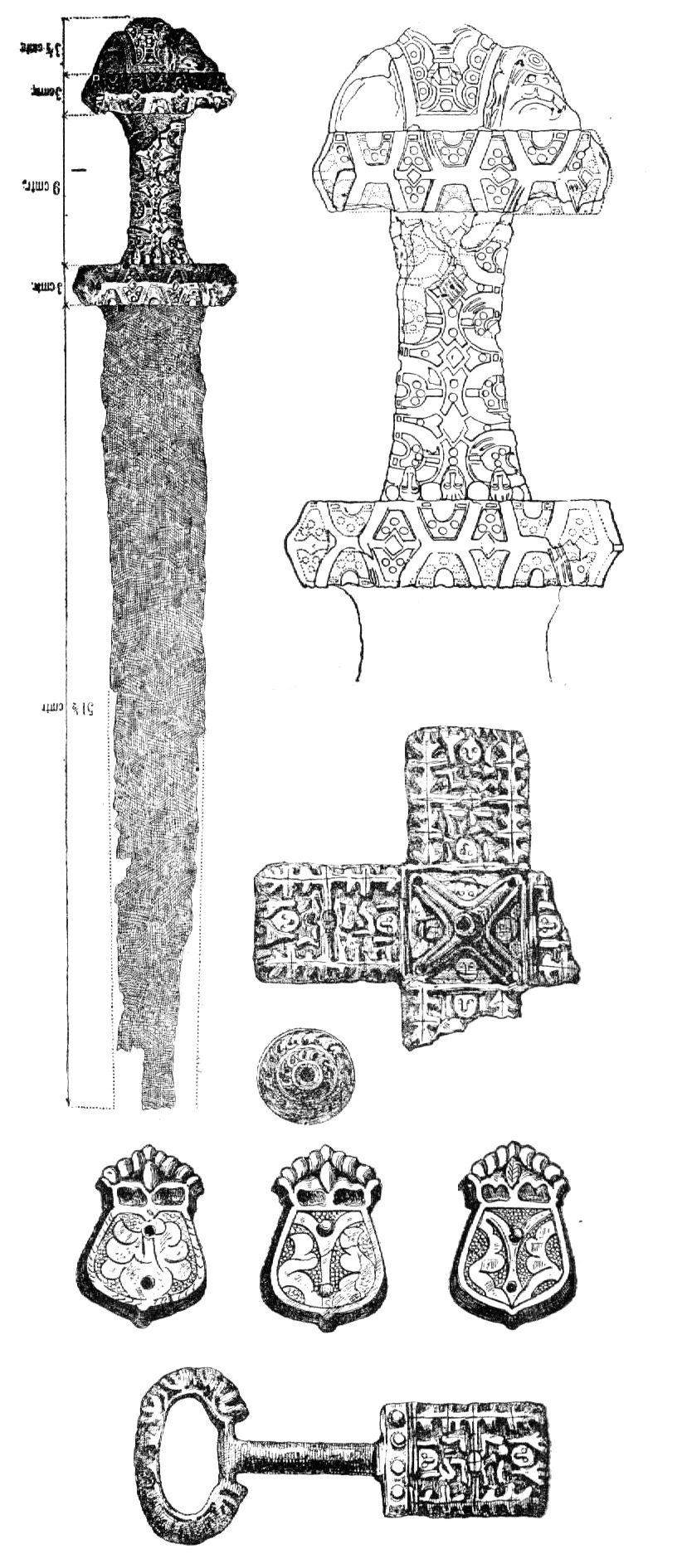
Great Moravian sword from Blatnica, unearthed in the 19th century, originally interpreted as a burial equipment from a "ducal" mound

=== Great Moravia ===
The meaning of the name of Great Moravia has been subject to debate. The designation "Great Moravia"—Megale Moravia (Μεγάλη Μοραβία) in Greek—stems from the work De Administrando Imperio written by the Byzantine Emperor Constantine VII Porphyrogenitos around 950. The emperor only used the adjective megale in connection with the polity when referring to events that occurred after its fall, implying that it should rather be translated as "old" instead of "great". According to a third theory, the megale adjective refers to a territory located beyond the borders of the Byzantine Empire. Finally, the historian Lubomír E. Havlík writes that Byzantine scholars used this adjective when referring to homelands of nomadic peoples, as demonstrated by the term "Great Bulgaria".

[There] is Belgrade, in which is the tower of the holy and great Constantine, the emperor; then, again, at the running back of the river, is the renowned Sirmium by name, a journey of two days from Belgrade; and beyond lies great Moravia, the unbaptized, which the [Hungarians] have blotted out, but over which in former days [Svatopluk] used to rule. Such are the landmarks and names along the Danube river [...].

— Constantine Porphyrogenitus: De Administrando Imperio

The work of Porphyrogenitos is the only nearly contemporaneous source using the adjective "great" in connection with Moravia. Other documents from the 9th and 10th centuries never used the term in this context. Instead they mention the polity as "Moravian realm" or "realm of Moravians" (regnum Marahensium, terra Marahensium, regnum Marahavorum, regnum Marauorum, terra Marauorum or regnum Margorum in Latin, and Moravьska oblastь in Old Church Slavonic), simply "Moravia" (Marawa, Marauia, and Maraha in Latin, Morava, Marava, or Murava in Old Church Slavonic, and M.ŕawa.t in Arabic), also regnum Sclavorum (realm of Slavs) or alternate regnum Rastizi (realm of Rastislav) or regnum Zuentibaldi (realm of Svatopluk).

=== Etymology ===
"Morava" is the Czech and Slovak name for both the river and the country, presumably the river name being primary and giving name to the surrounding country. The ending -ava, as in many other Czech and Slovak rivers, is most often regarded as Slavicization of the originally Germanic -ahwa (= modern German "Au" or "-a"), cognate to Latin aqua. Some scholars again link it, via Celtic -ab, to Indo-European PIE *apa/*opa ("water, sea"). The root mor- might be also connected with other Indo-European words with the meaning of water, lake or sea (sea: Slavic more, Latin mare, Welsh môr, German Meer; humidity: English and German Moor, Slavic mokr-). Compare also the names of the rivers of Mur in Austria and Morava in Serbia, all relatively nearby.

== Territory ==
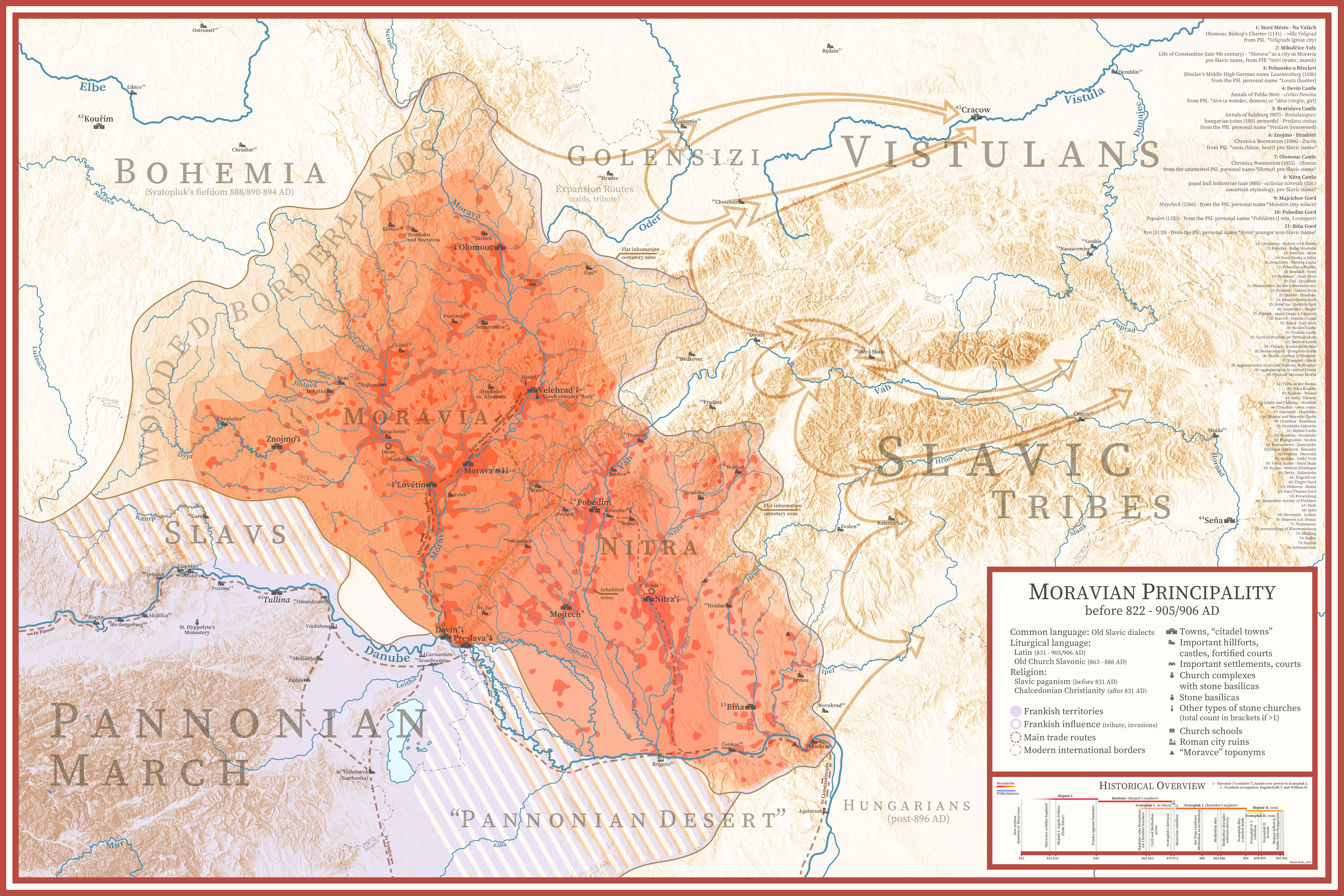
The core of Great Moravia

After the fall of Great Moravia, its central territory was gradually divided into the newly ascending Kingdom of Bohemia and the Hungarian Kingdom. The frontier was originally settled on the Morava river. However, from the 12th century, the Czech kings managed to gain more and more of the region on the eastern bank, eventually gaining the whole stretch of the eastern territory from Uherské Hradiště down to Strážnice along the White Carpathians. The original core territory of Great Moravia, nowadays forming the eastern part of Moravia and situated between the White Carpathians and the Chřiby mountains, has retained its non-Czech identity in its designation "Slovácko" which shows common origins with the name of the neighbouring Slovakia—a token of a past shared identity in Great Moravian times. This core region of Great Moravia along the river has retained a unique culture with a rich folklore tradition: the above-mentioned Slovácko stretches, to the south (where the Morava river forms the Czech-Slovak frontier), into two regions—the Podluží region on the Morava's western (Czech) bank and Záhorie on its eastern (Slovak) bank. Záhorie also boasts the only surviving building from Great Moravian times, the chapel at Kopčany just across the Morava from the archaeological site of Mikulčice (these two important Great Moravian places are now connected by a bridge). The core of Great Moravia was extended, according to annals, in the early 830s, when Mojmir I of Moravia conquered the neighbouring principality of Nitra (present-day western Slovakia). The former principality of Nitra was used as what is termed in Slovak údelné kniežatsvo, or the territory given to and ruled by the successor to the throne, traditionally the ruling kъnendzь (Prince)'s sister's son.

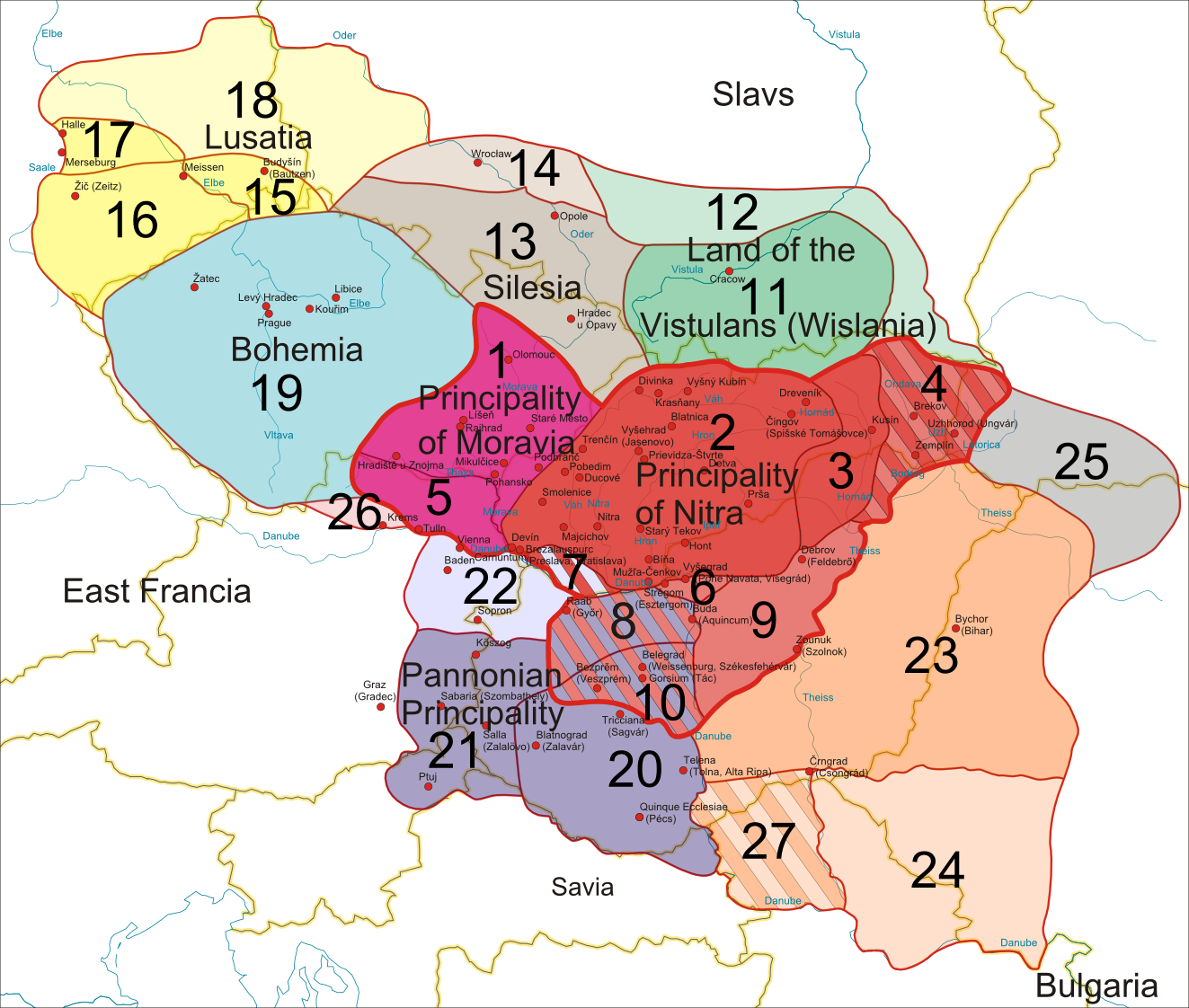
A speculative map of lands within Great Moravia

Nevertheless, the extent, and even the very location of Great Moravia (historiographical terms, as its original formal name is unknown) are a subject of debate. Rival theories place its centre south of the Danube (the Morava in Serbia) or on the Great Hungarian Plain. The exact date when the Moravian state was founded is also disputed, but it probably occurred in the early 830s under Prince Mojmír I (r. 820s/830s–846), the first known ruler of the united Moravia. Mojmír and his successor, Rastislav ("Rostislav" in Czech), who ruled from 846 to 870, initially acknowledged the suzerainty of the Carolingian monarchs, but the Moravian fight for independence caused a series of armed conflicts with East Francia from the 840s.

=== Traditional view ===
According to most historians, the core territories of Moravia were located in the valley of the river Morava, today in present-day Czech Republic and Slovakia. Archaeological findings of large early medieval fortresses and the significant cluster of settlements growing around them suggest that an important centre of power emerged in this region in the 9th century. Early sources (Alfred the Great's contemporaneous translation of Orosius's History of the World, which mentioned Moravia's neighbours, and the description of the travel of Cyril and Methodius from Moravia to Venice through Pannonia in the Life of Cyril) also substantiate the traditional view.

These Maroara have to the west of them the Thyringas and some Behemas and half the Begware, and south them on the other side of the Danube river is the land Carendre extending south as far as the mountains called the Alps. ... To the east of the land Carendre, beyond the uninhabited district, is the land of the Pulgare, and east of that is the land of Greeks. To the east of the land of Maroara is the land of the Vistula, and east of that are those Datia who were formerly Goths.

— King Alfred's Anglo-Saxon Version of Orosius

The borders of Moravia cannot exactly be determined because of the lack of accurate contemporaneous sources. For instance, the monks writing the Annals of Fulda in the 9th century obviously had limited knowledge of the geography of distant regions of Central Europe. Furthermore, Moravian monarchs adopted an expansionist policy in the 830s, thus the borders of their realm often changed.

Moravia reached the peak of its territorial expansion under Svatopluk I (r. 870–894). Lesser Poland, Pannonia and other regions were forced to accept, at least formally and often only for a short period, his suzerainty. On the other hand, the existence of the archaeologically attested shared cultural zones between Moravia, Lesser Poland and Silesia do not prove that the northern boundaries of Moravia were located over these territories. According to archaeologist Béla Miklós Szőke, the comitatus of Mosaburg in Pannonia was never part of Moravia. Neither archaeological finds nor written sources substantiate the traditional view of the permanent annexation of huge territories in his reign. Other scholars warn that it's a mistake to draw the boundaries of core territories because Moravia did not reach that development level.

=== Further theories ===
In 1784, Slovak historian Juraj Sklenár disputed the traditional view on the location of Moravia and placed its core region in the region of Syrmia, stating that it spread from that location to the north to present-day Slovakia, Moravia and Bohemia. Similarly, in the 1820s, Friedrich Blumenerger placed Great Moravia to the south on the borders of Pannonia and Moesia. Their views remained isolated until the 1970s, when Imre Boba again published a theory that Moravia's core territory must have been located around Sirmium, near the river Great Morava. Péter Püspöki-Nagy proposed the existence of two Moravias: a "Great" Moravia at the southern Morava river in present-day Serbia, and another Moravia on the northern Morava river in present-day Czech Republic and Slovakia. A similar theory was also published by Toru Senga. In the 1990s, the southern thesis was further developed by Charles Bowlus, who wrote that Moravia emerged in the region of the "confluences of the Drava, Sava, Drina, Tisza and southern Morava rivers with the Danube". Bowlus emphasized that the orientation of the Frankish marcher organization was focused on the south-east territories, which also supports Great Moravia's southern position. Martin Eggers suggested the original location of Moravia was centered around modern Banat at the confluence of the rivers Tisza and Mureș ('Moriš' in Serbian), with further expansions extending to the territories in present-day Czech Republic and Slovakia.

== History ==
=== Origins (before c. 800) ===
The earliest possible reference to Slavic tribes living in the valley of the northern Morava river was made by the Byzantine historian Procopius. He wrote of a group of Germanic Heruli who "passed through the territory of all of the Sclavenes" while moving towards Denmark in 512. Archaeological sites have yielded hand-made ceramics, and closely analogous objects in southern Poland and western Ukraine appeared at the confluence of the northern Morava River and the Middle Danube, dated to around 550.

Large territories in the Pannonian Basin were conquered after 568 by the nomadic Avars who had arrived from the Eurasian Steppes. The Slavs were forced to pay tribute to the Avars and to participate in their raids against the Byzantine Empire, the Franks and the Lombards. Even though the Avar settlement area stabilized on the Danube river in the early period of the khaganate (southern border of present-day Slovakia), a smaller (southernmost) part came under their direct military control after the fall of Samo's empire. (Note: The occurrence of the biritual cemeteries from the middle and late Avar period is limited to the line Devín-Nitra-Levice-Želovce-Košice-Šebastovce, but no proof of a permanent presence of the Avars was found north of this line (~7200 km^{2} with 180 known localities). The archaeological research in Slovakia does not suggest that the border of the khaganate sat on the Carpathians.) In the late period of the khaganate, the Avars had already inclined to a more settled lifestyle and their co-existence with the local Slavs can be already characterized as some kind of cultural symbiosis.

In the 7th and 8th centuries, the development of the local Slavs accelerated. The first Slavic fortified settlements were built in present-day Moravia as early as the last decades of the 7th century. From the end of the 7th century, it is possible to register the rise of a new social elite in Moravia, Slovakia and Bohemia—the warrior horsemen. The social organization of the local Slavs continued to grow during the 8th century, which can be documented by further building and development of fortified settlements. In Moravia, they unambiguously concentrate around the river Morava. In Slovakia, the oldest Slavic fortified settlements are documented for the last decades of the 8th century. They were exclusively in areas which were not under direct Avar influence, but probably not built only as protection against them, because some of them are also found in northern territories (Orava, Spiš). Variation in pottery implies the existence of at least three tribes inhabiting the wider region of the northern Morava river in the early 9th century. Settlement complexes from the period were unearthed, for instance, near modern Bratislava, Brno and Olomouc. Fortresses erected at Bratislava, Rajhrad, Staré Město and other places around 800 evidence the development of local centres of power in the same regions.

Charlemagne launched a series of military expeditions against the Avars in the last decade of the 8th century which caused the collapse of the Avar Khaganate. The Royal Frankish Annals narrates that Avars who "could not stay in their previous dwelling places on account of the attacks of the Slavs" approached Charlemagne in Aachen in 805 and asked to be allowed to settle in the lowlands along the river Rába.

Following the collapse of the Avar Khaganate, swords and other elements of Frankish military equipment became popular in territories to the north of the Middle Danube. A new archaeological horizon—the so-called "Blatnica-Mikulčice horizon"—emerged in the valley of the northern Morava river and its wider region in the same period. This horizon of metalwork represents a synthesis of "Late Avar" and Carolingian art. One of its signature items is a sword found in a grave in Blatnica in Slovakia, which is dated to the period between 825 and 850. According to the archaeologist Florin Curta, the sword was produced by a Frankish artisan from the Carolingian Empire. On the other hand, Ján Dekan writes that it represents how Moravian craftsmen selected "elements from the ornamental content of Carolingian art which suited their aesthetic needs and traditions".

=== Development of Moravia (c. 800–846) ===
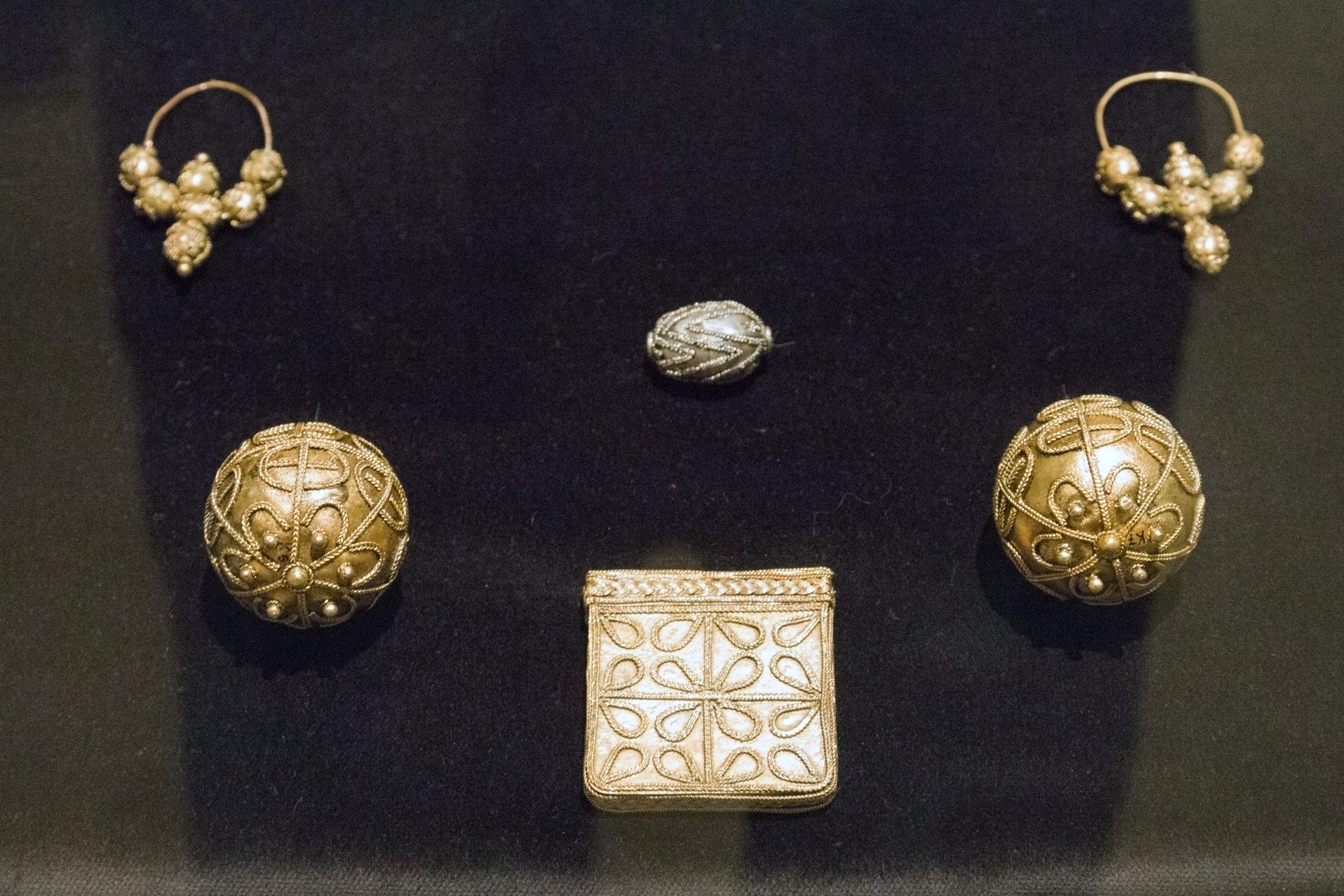
Jewelry from a princely burial site at Kolín, c. 850–900 AD

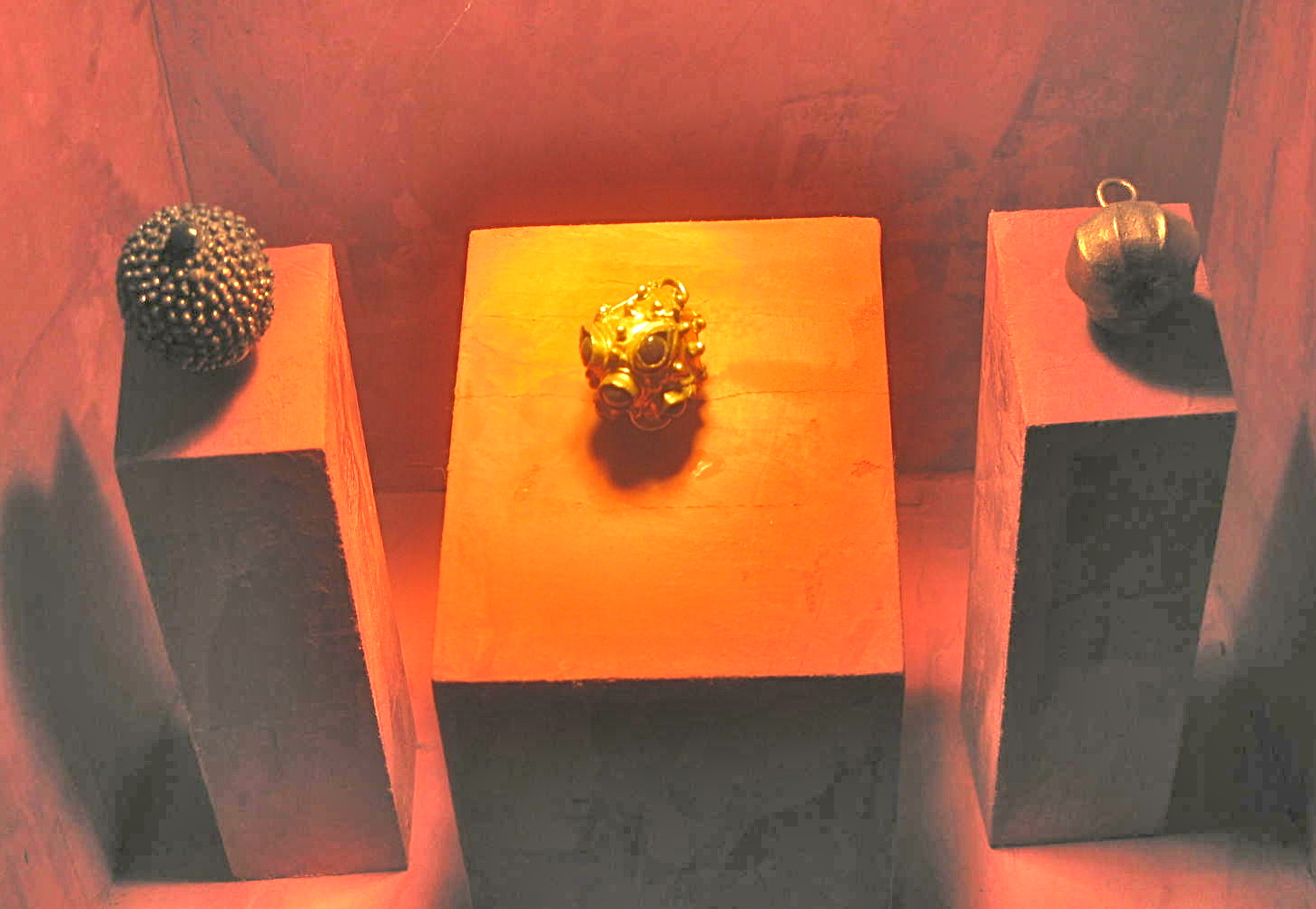
Spherical gombiki from the Mikulčice Archaeological Park

Moravia, the first Western Slavic polity, arose through the unification of the Slavic tribes settled north of the Danube. However, its formation is scarcely described by contemporaneous sources. The archaeologist Barford writes that the first report of the emerging Moravian state was recorded in 811. In the autumn of this year, according to the Royal Frankish Annals, Avar rulers and the duces or "leaders of the Slavs who live along the Danube" visited the court of Emperor Louis the Pious (r. 814–840) in Aachen. The earliest certain reference to Moravians or Maravani is dated to 822 when the emperor "received embassies and presents from all the East Slavs, that is, Obodrites, Sorbs, Wilzi, Bohemians, Moravians and Praedenecenti, and from the Avars living in Pannonia" at an assembly held at Frankfurt.

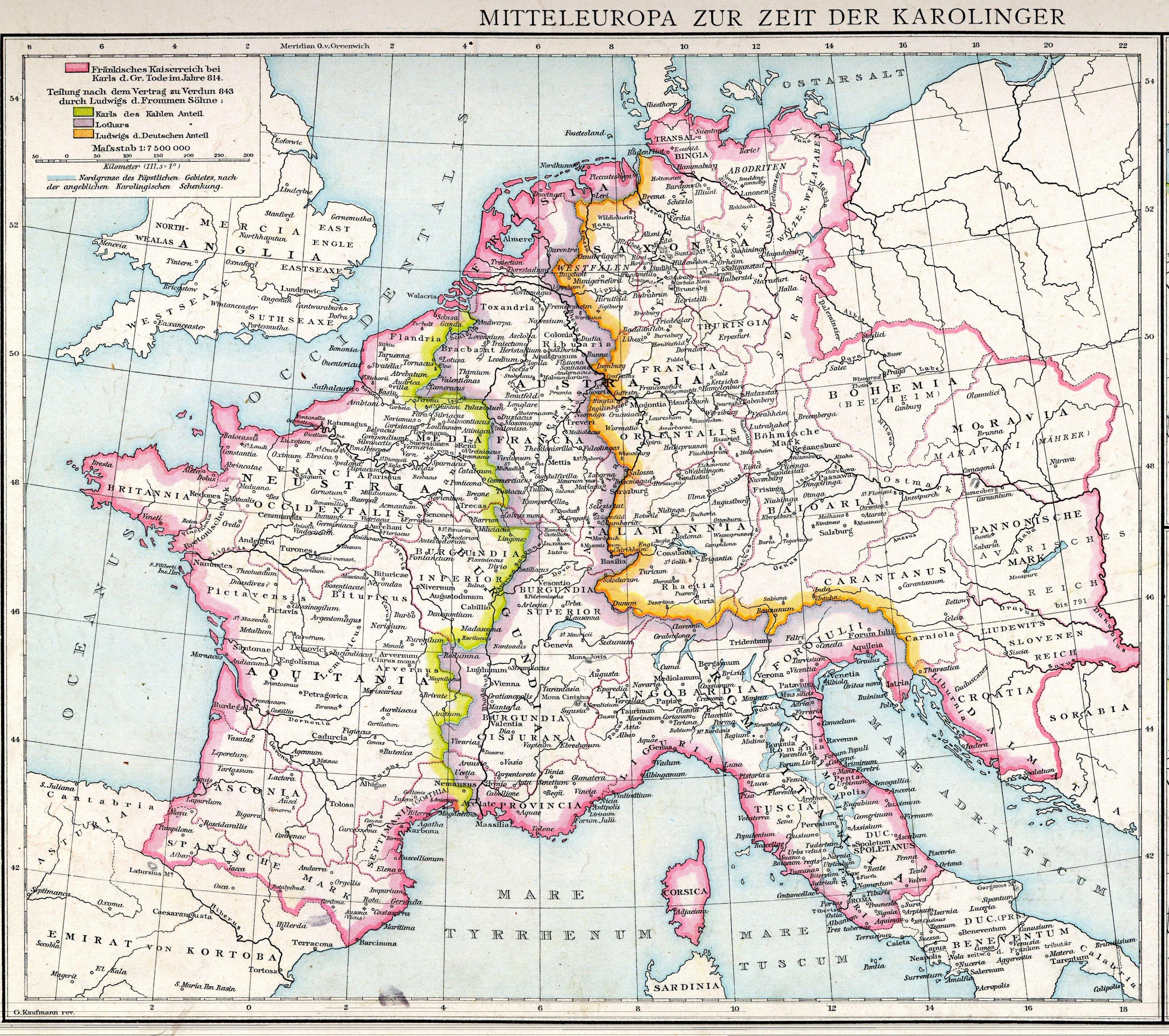
Map of Moravia within East Francia in 814

The late-9th-century Conversio Bagoariorum et Carantanorum ("The Conversion of the Bavarians and the Carantanians") makes the first reference to a Moravian ruler. Carantanians (ancestors of present-day Slovenians) were the first Slavic people to accept Christianity from the West. They were mostly Christianized by Irish missionaries sent by the Archdiocese of Salzburg, among them Modestus, known as the "Apostle of Carantanians". This process was later described in the Conversio Bagoariorum et Carantanorum, which states that Mojmír, "duke of the Moravians", expelled "one Pribina" across the Danube. Pribina fled to Ratpot who administered the March of Pannonia from around 833. Whether Pribina had up to that time been an independent ruler or one of Mojmir's officials is a matter of scholarly discussion. For instance, Urbańczyk writes that Mojmir and Pribina were two of the many Moravian princes in the early 9th century, while according to Havlík, Třeštík and Vlasto, Pribina was Mojmír's lieutenant in Nitra. Historians who identify Pribina as the ruler of an autonomous state, the Principality of Nitra—for instance, Bartl, Kirschbaum and Urbańczyk—add that "Great Moravia" emerged through the enforced integration of his principality into Moravia under Mojmír.

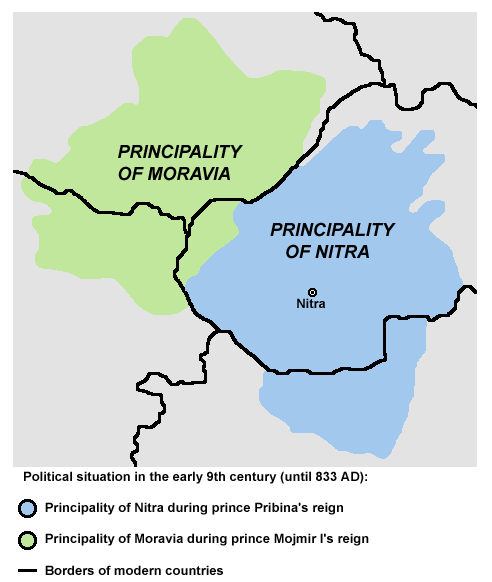
A map presenting the theory of the co-existence of two principalities (Moravia and Nitra) before the 830s

The 9th-century Catalogue of Fortresses and Regions to the North of the Danube—which lists the peoples along the borders of East Francia in a north-to-south order—mentions that the Moravians or Marharii had 11 fortresses or civitates. The document locates the Marhari between the Bohemians and the Bulgars, and also makes mention of the Merehani and their 30 fortresses. According to Havlík, who writes that Conversion is a consolidated version of notes made by several authors in different years, the Moravians are twice mentioned in the text: first as Marhari, and next as Merehani. He says, that the reference to the Marhari and their 11 fortresses was made between 817 and 843, and the note of the Merehani shows the actual state under Svatopluk I. In contrast with Havlík, Steinhübel together with Třeštík and Vlasto identify the Merehani with the inhabitants of the Principality of Nitra. A third view is presented by Püspöki-Nagy and Senga, who write that the reference to the Merehanii—who obviously inhabited the southern regions of the Great Hungarian Plains to the north of the Danube, but south of the territories dominated by the Bulgars—and their 30 fortresses shows the existence of another Moravia in Central Europe.

Among the Bohemians are 15 fortresses. The [Marharii] have 11 fortresses. The region of the Bulgars is immense. That numerous people has five fortresses, since their great multitude does not require fortresses. The people called [Merehanii] have 30 fortresses.

— Catalogue of Fortresses and Regions to the North of the Danube

According to a 13th-century source, the History of the Bishops of Passau and the Dukes of Bavaria, Bishop Reginhar of Passau (r. 818–838) baptized "all of the Moravians" in 831. There is no other information on the circumstances of this mass conversion. Vlasto writes that Mojmír had by that time been converted to Christianity; according to Petr Sommer and other historians, he was also baptized on this occasion. All the same, the Life of Methodius narrates that Christian missionaries had by the 860s arrived in Moravia "from among the Italians, Greeks and Germans" who taught them "in various ways". The Life of Constantine adds that missionaries from East Francia did not forbid "the offering of sacrifices according to the ancient customs", which shows that pagan rites were continued for decades even after 831.

According to the Annals of Fulda, around August 15, 846, Louis the German, King of East Francia (r. 843–876) launched a campaign "against the Moravian Slavs, who were planning to defect". The exact circumstances of his expedition are unclear. For instance, Vlasto writes that the Frankish monarch took advantage of the internal strife which followed Mojmír's death, while according to Kirschbaum, Mojmír was captured and dethroned during the campaign. However, it is without doubt that Louis the German appointed Mojmír's nephew, Rastislav, as the new duke of Moravia during this campaign.

=== Fights for independence (846–870) ===
Rastislav (r. 846–870), who initially accepted the suzerainty of Louis the German, consolidated his position within Moravia and expanded the frontiers of his realm. For instance, according to Kirschbaum, he annexed the region of the Slanské Hills in the eastern parts of present-day Slovakia. Barford even writes that the development of the state mentioned as "Great Moravia" by Constantine Porphyrogenitus commenced in Rastislav's reign.

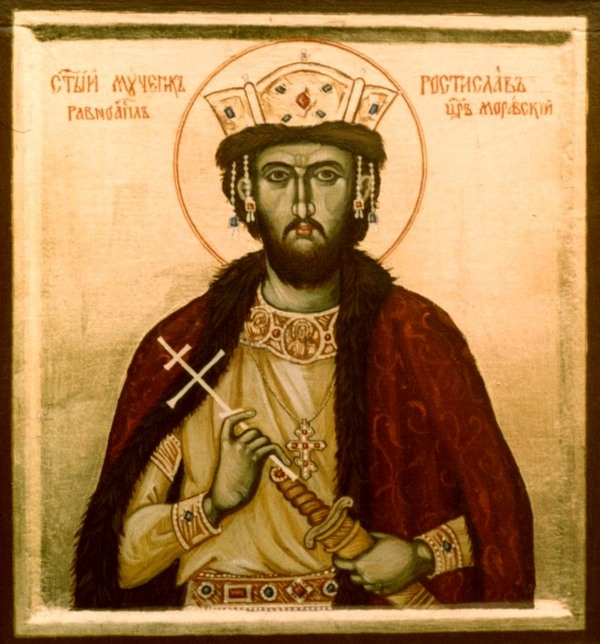
Modern depiction of Rastislav as an Orthodox saint

He turned against East Francia and supported the rebellion of Radbod, the deposed prefect of the March of Pannonia, against Louis the German in 853. The Frankish monarch retaliated by invading Moravia in 855. According to the Annals of Fulda, the Moravians were "defended by strong fortifications", and the Franks withdrew without defeating them, though the combats lasted until a peace treaty was worked out in 859. The truce is regarded as a stalemate and shows the growing strength of Rastislav's realm. Conflicts between Moravia and East Francia continued for years. For instance, Rastislav supported Louis the German's son, Carloman, in his rebellion against his father in 861. The first record of a raid by the Magyars in Central Europe seems to have been connected to these events. According to the Annals of St. Bertin, "enemies called Hungarians" ravaged Louis the German's kingdom in 862, which suggests that they supported Carloman.

Rastislav wanted to weaken influence of Frankish priests in his realm, who served the interests of East Francia. He first sent envoys to Pope Nicholas I in 861 and asked him to send missionaries to Moravia who mastered the Slavic language. Having received no answer from Rome, Rastislav turned to the Byzantine Emperor Michael III with the same request. By establishing relations with Constantinople, he also desired to counter an anti-Moravian alliance recently concluded between the Franks and Bulgarians. Upon his request, the emperor sent two brothers, Constantine and Michael—the future Saints Cyril and Methodius to Moravia in 863. Constantine's Life narrates that he developed the first Slavic alphabet and translated the Gospel into Old Church Slavonic around that time.

Louis the German crossed the Danube and again invaded Moravia in August 864. He besieged Rastislav "in a certain city, which in the language of that people is called Dowina", according to the Annals of Fulda. Although the Franks could not take the fortress, Rastislav agreed to accept Louis the German's suzerainty. However, he continued to support the Frankish monarch's opponents. For instance, Louis the German deprived one Count Werner "of his public offices", because the count was suspected to have conspired with Rastislav against the king.

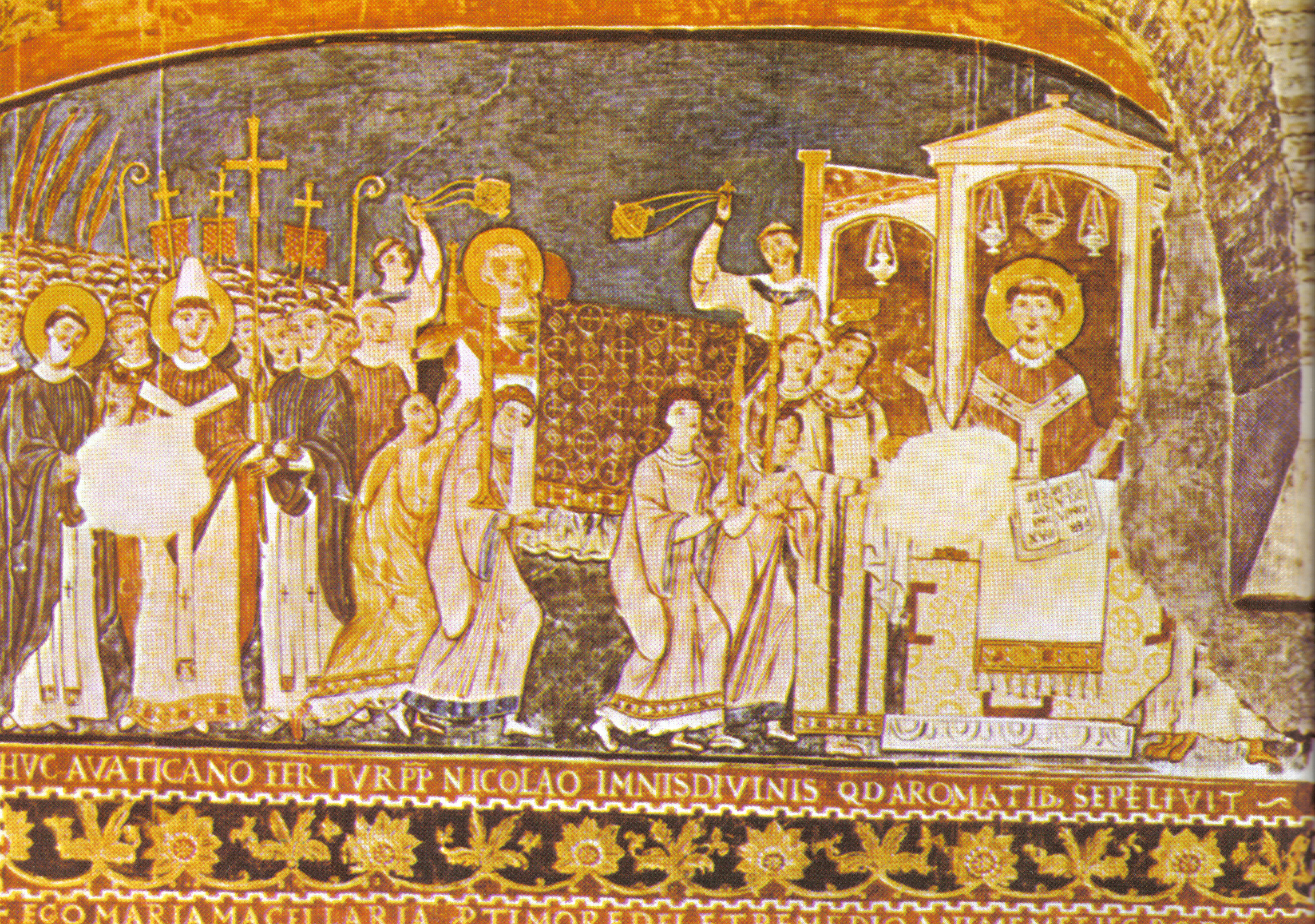
Constantine and Methodius in Rome

The Byzantine brothers, Constantine (Cyril) and Methodius, visited Rome in 867. At the end of the year, Pope Hadrian II (r. 867–872) sanctioned their translations of liturgical texts and ordained six of their disciples as priests. The pope informed three prominent Slavic rulers—Rastislav, his nephew, Svatopluk and Kocel, who administered Lower Pannonia—of his approval of the use of the vernacular in the liturgy in a letter of 869. In 869 Methodius was sent by the pope to Rastislav, Svatopluk and Kocel, but Methodius visited only Kocel, who sent him back to the pope. Hadrian then consecrated Methodius as archbishop with the title of Metropolitan of Sirmium to "the seat of Saint Andronicus", i.e., the see of Sirmium. At the beginning of the 9th century, many Carantanians (Alpine Slavs), ancestors of present-day Slovenians, settled in the Lower Pannonian region, also known as the Balaton Principality, which was referred to in Latin sources as Carantanorum regio, or "The Land of the Carantanians". The name Carantanians (Quarantani) was in use until the 13th century. Kocel's decision to support Methodius represented a complete break with his father's pro-Frankish policy. Svatopluk had by that time been administering what had been the Principality of Nitra, under his uncle Rastislav's suzerainty, but contemporaneous documents do not reveal the exact location of Svatopluk's successorial territory. Frankish troops invaded both Rastislav's and Svatopluk's realms in August 869. According to the Annals of Fulda, the Franks destroyed many forts, defeated Moravian troops and seized loot. However, they could not take Rastislav's main fortress and withdrew.

[Louis the German] ordered the Bavarians to assist Carloman, who wished to fight against [Svatopluk], the nephew of [Rastislav]. He himself kept the Franks and Alemans with him to fight against [Rastislav]. When it was already time to set out he fell ill, and was compelled to leave the leadership of the army to Charles his youngest son and commend the outcome to God. Charles, when he came with the army with which he had been entrusted to [Rastislav's] huge fortification, quite unlike any built in olden times, with God's help burnt with fire all the walled fortifications of the region, seized and carried off the treasures which had been hidden in the woods or buried in the fields, and killed or put to fight all who came against him. Carloman also laid waste the territory of [Svatopluk], [Rastislav's] nephew, with fire and war. When the whole region had been laid waste the brothers Charles and Carloman came together and congratulated each other on the victories bestowed by heaven.

— Annals of Fulda

=== Svatopluk's reign (870–894) ===
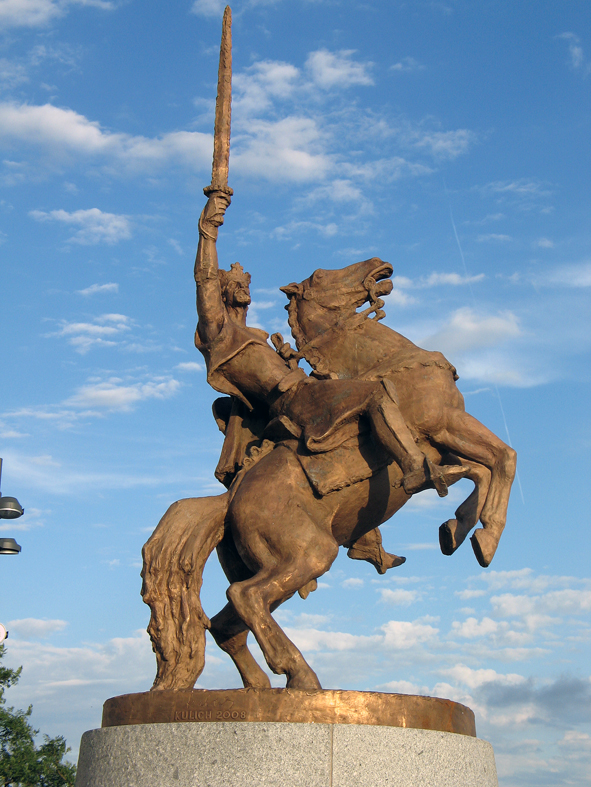
Statue of Svatopluk I on Bratislava Castle, Slovakia

Svatopluk allied himself with the Franks and helped them seize Rastislav in 870. Carloman annexed Rastislav's realm and appointed two Frankish lords, William and Engelschalk, to administer it. Frankish soldiers arrested Archbishop Methodius on his way from Rome to Moravia at the end of the year. Svatopluk, who continued to administer his own realm after his uncle's fall, was accused of treachery and arrested by Carloman on Louis the German's orders in 871. The Moravians rose up in open rebellion against the two Frankish governors and elected a kinsman of Svatopluk, Slavomír, duke. Svatopluk returned to Moravia, took over command of the insurgents, and drove the Franks from Moravia. According to the Czech historian Dušan Třeštík, the rebellion of 871 led to the formation of the first Slavic state.

Louis the German sent his armies against Moravia in 872. The imperial troops plundered the countryside, but could not take the "extremely well-fortified stronghold" where Svatopluk took refuge. The Moravian ruler even succeeded in mustering an army which defeated a number of imperial troops, forcing the Franks to withdraw from Moravia. Svatopluk soon initiated negotiations with Louis the German, which ended with a peace treaty concluded at Forchheim in May 874. According to the Annals of Fulda, at Forchheim Svatopluk's envoy promised that Svatopluk "would remain faithful" to Louis the German "all the days of his life", and the Moravian ruler was also obliged to pay a yearly tribute to East Francia.

In the meantime, Archbishop Methodius, who had been released upon the demand of Pope John VIII (r. 872–882) in 873, returned to Moravia. Methodius's Life narrates that "Prince Svatopluk and all the Moravians" decided to entrust "to him all the churches and clergy in all the towns" in Moravia upon his arrival. In Moravia, Methodius continued the work of translation started in his brother's life. For instance, he translated "all the Scriptures in full, save Maccabees", according to his Life. However, Frankish priests in Moravia opposed the Slavic liturgy and even accused Methodius of heresy. Although the Holy See never denied Methodius's orthodoxy, in 880 the Pope appointed his main opponent, Wiching, as bishop of Nitra upon the request of Svatopluk, who himself preferred the Latin rite.

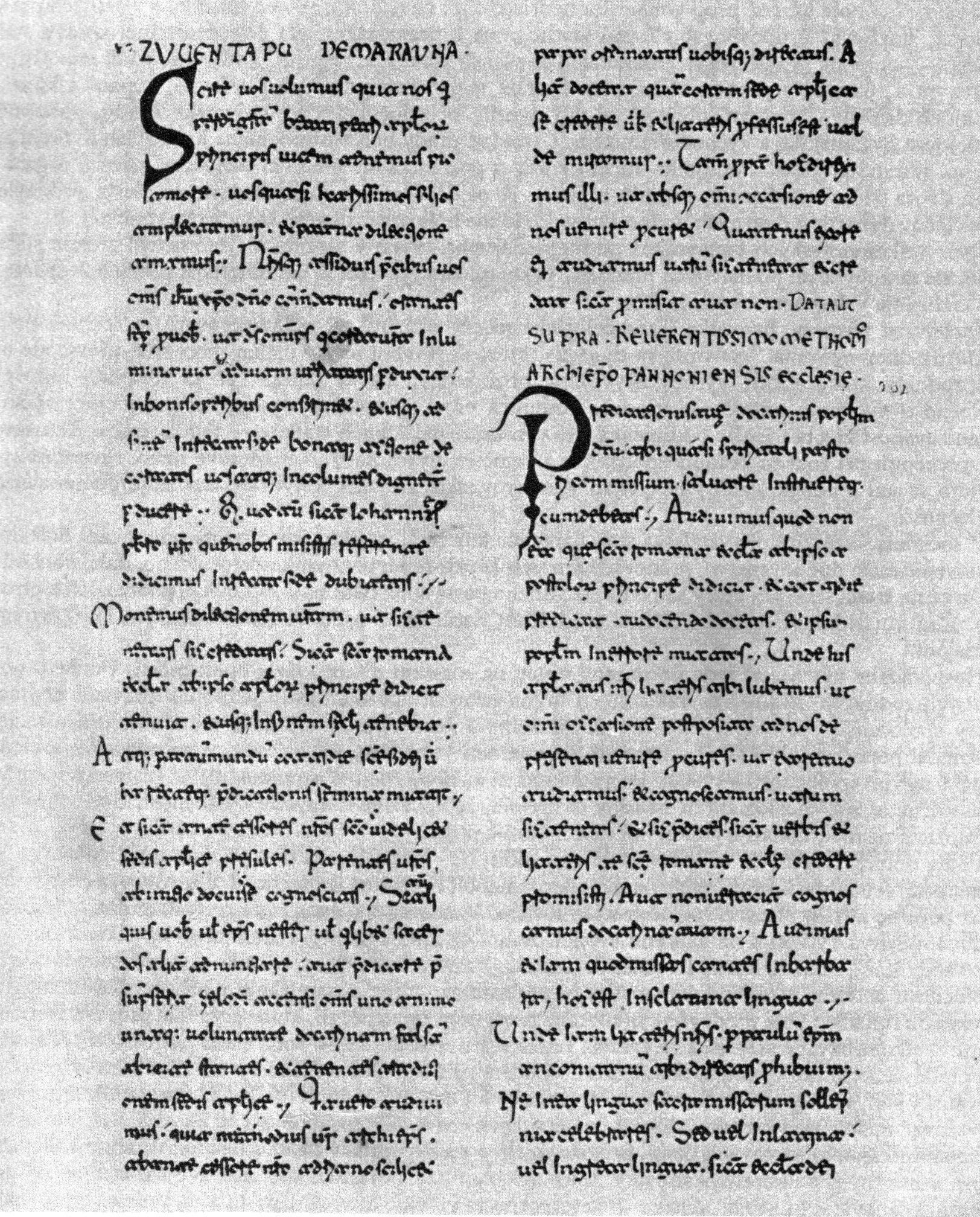
The papal bull Scire vos volumus of 879 addressed to Svatopluk

A letter written around 900 by Archbishop Theotmar of Salzburg (r. 873–907) and his suffragan bishops mentions that the pope sent Wiching to "a newly baptized people" whom Svatopluk "had defeated in war and converted from paganism to Christianity". Other sources also prove that Svatopluk significantly expanded the borders of his realm. For instance, according to the Life of Methodius, Moravia "began to expand much more into all lands and to defeat its enemies successfully" in the period beginning around 874. The same source writes of a "very powerful pagan prince settled on the Vistula" in present-day Poland who persecuted the Christians in his country, but was attacked and seized by Svatopluk.

Upon Methodius's request, in June 880 Pope John issued the bull Industriae tuae for Svatopluk whom he addressed as "glorious count" (gloriosus comes). In the bull, the pope refers to Svatopluk as "the only son" (unicus fillius) of the Holy See, thus applying a title which had up to that time been only used in papal correspondence with emperors and candidates for imperial rank. The pope explicitly granted the protection of the Holy See to the Moravian monarch, his officials and subjects. Furthermore, the bull also confirmed Methodius's position as the head of the church in Moravia with jurisdiction over all clergymen, including the Frankish priests, in Svatopluk's realm and Old Church Slavonic was recognized as the fourth liturgical language together with Latin, Greek and Hebrew.

The longer version of the Annals of Salzburg makes mention of a raid by the Magyars and the Kabars in East Francia in 881. According to Gyula Kristó and other historians, Svatopluk initiated this raid, because his relations with Arnulf—the son of Carloman, King of East Francia (r. 876–881), who administered the March of Pannonia—became tense. Archbishop Theotmar of Salzburg clearly accused the Moravians of hiring "a large number of Hungarians" and sending them against East Francia at an unspecified date.

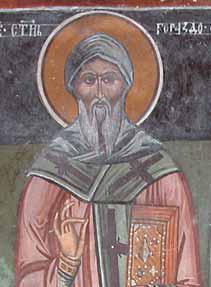
Icon of St. Gorazd, a disciple of St. Cyril and Method of Moravian origin, who was the designated successor of archbishop Method

During the "Wilhelminer War"—a civil war between two factions of local noblemen in the March of Pannonia which lasted from 882 and 884—Svatopluk "collected troops from all the Slav lands" and invaded Pannonia. According to the Bavarian version of the Annals of Fulda, the Moravians' invasion "led to Pannonia's being laid waste" to the east of the river Rába. However, Regino of Prüm states that it was Arnulf of Carinthia who maintained control over Pannonia in 884. Svatopluk had a meeting with Emperor Charles the Fat (r. 881–888) at Tulln an der Donau in Bavaria in 884. At the meeting, "dux" Svatopluk became the emperor's vassal and "swore fidelity to him", promising that he would never attack the emperor's realm.

Archbishop Methodius died on April 6, 885. Led by Bishop Wiching of Nitra, Methodius's opponents took advantage of his death and persuaded Pope Stephen V (r. 885–891) to restrict the use of Old Church Slavonic in the liturgy in the bull Quia te zelo. Bishop Wiching even convinced Svatopluk to expel all Methodius's disciples from Moravia in 886, thus marring the promising literary and cultural boom of Central European Slavs—the Slovaks took nearly a thousand years to develop a new literary language of their own.

Pope Stephen addressed the Quia te zelo bull to Zventopolco regi Sclavorum ("Svatopluk, King of the Slavs"), suggesting that Svatopluk had by the end of 885 been crowned king. Likewise, Frankish annals occasionally referred to Svatopluk as king in connection with events occurring in this period. The Chronicle of the Priest of Dioclea—a late-12th-century source with questionable reliability—narrates that one "Sventopelk" was crowned king "on the field of Dalma" in the presence of a papal legate.

Moravia reached its maximum territorial extent in the last years of Svatopluk's reign. According to Regino of Prüm, King Arnulf of East Francia "gave the command of the Bohemians to King Zwentibald of the Moravian Slavs" in 890. Bartl and other Slovak historians write that Svatopluk "probably" also annexed Silesia and Lusatia in the early 890s. According to the Annals of Fulda, King Arnulf proposed a meeting to Svatopluk in 892, "but the latter in his usual fashion refused to come to the king and betrayed his fidelity and all the things which he had promised before". In response, Arnulf invaded Moravia in 892, but could not defeat Svatopluk, although Magyar horsemen also supported the Eastern Frankish monarch.

=== Decline and fall (894–before 907) ===
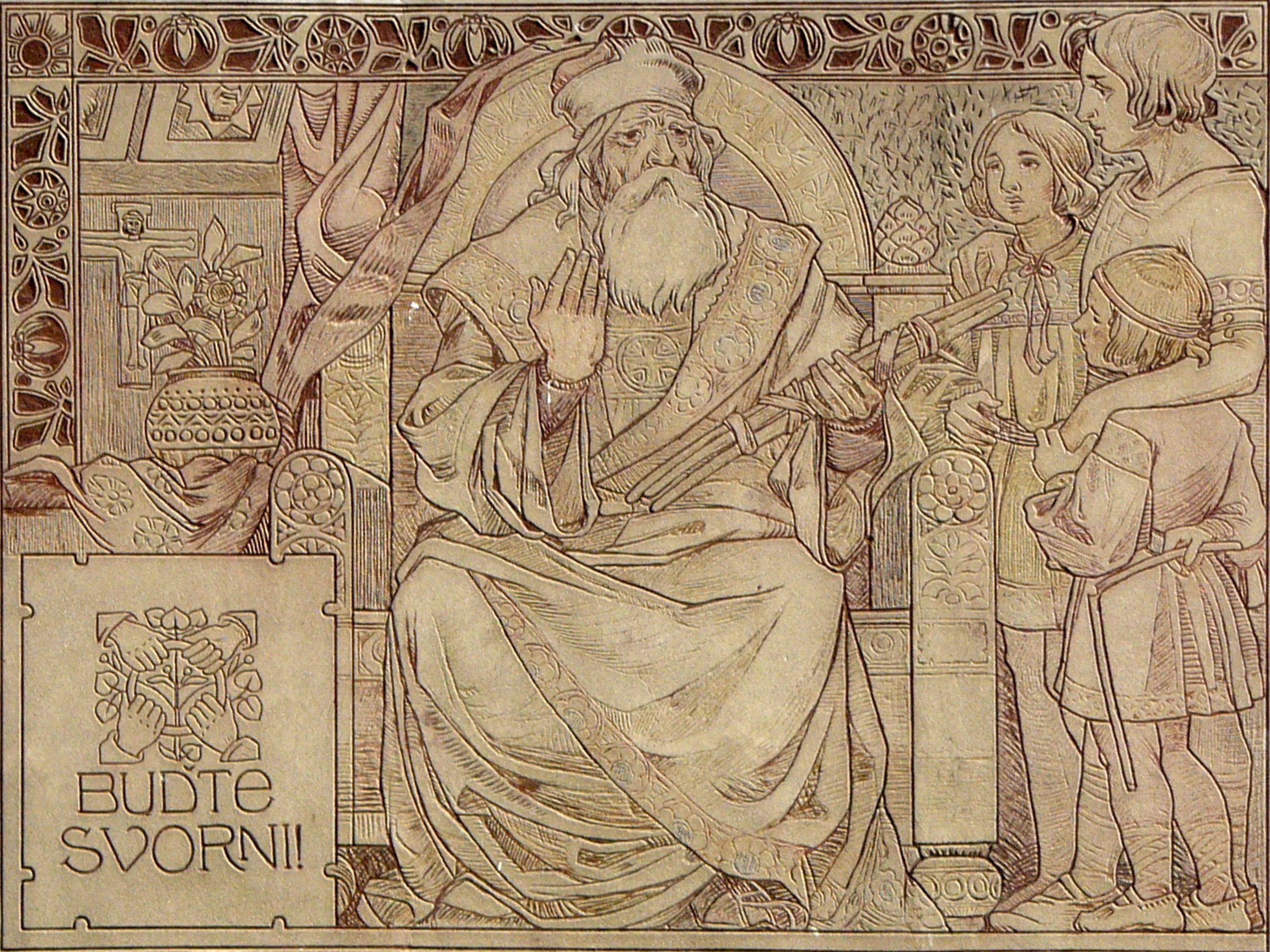
Svatopluk I with three twigs and his three sons—Mojmír II, Svatopluk II and Predslav

Svatopluk—"a man most prudent among his people and very cunning by nature", according to Regino of Prüm—died in the summer of 894. He was succeeded by his son, Mojmir II, but his empire shortly disintegrated, because the tribes subjugated to Svatopluk's rule by force started to get rid of Moravian supremacy. For instance, the Bohemian dukes (based in the Prague region) accepted King Arnulf's suzerainty in June 895, and Mojmír II attempted to restore his supremacy over them without success in the next two years. On the other hand, he succeeded in restoring the Church organization in Moravia by persuading Pope John IX (r. 898–900) to send his legates to Moravia in 898. The legates in short order installed an archbishop and "three bishops as his suffragans" in Moravia.

Conflicts emerging between Mojmír II and his younger brother, Svatopluk II, gave King Arnulf a pretext to send his troops to Moravia in 898 and 899. The Annals of Fulda writes that the "boy" Svatopluk II was rescued by Bavarian forces "from the dungeon of the city in which he was held with his men" in 899. According to Bartl, who wrote that Svatopluk II had inherited the "Principality of Nitra" from his father, the Bavarians also destroyed the fortress at Nitra on this occasion.

According to most nearly contemporaneous sources, the Hungarians played a prominent role in the fall of Moravia. For instance, Regino of Prüm writes that Svatopluk I's "sons held his kingdom for a short and unhappy time, because the Hungarians utterly destroyed everything in it". The Hungarians started their conquest of the Carpathian Basin after their defeat in the westernmost territories of the Pontic steppes around 895 by a coalition of the Bulgars and Pechenegs. Only a late source, the 16th-century Johannes Aventinus, writes that the Hungarians had by that time controlled wide regions to east of the rivers Hron and Danube in the Carpathian Basin.

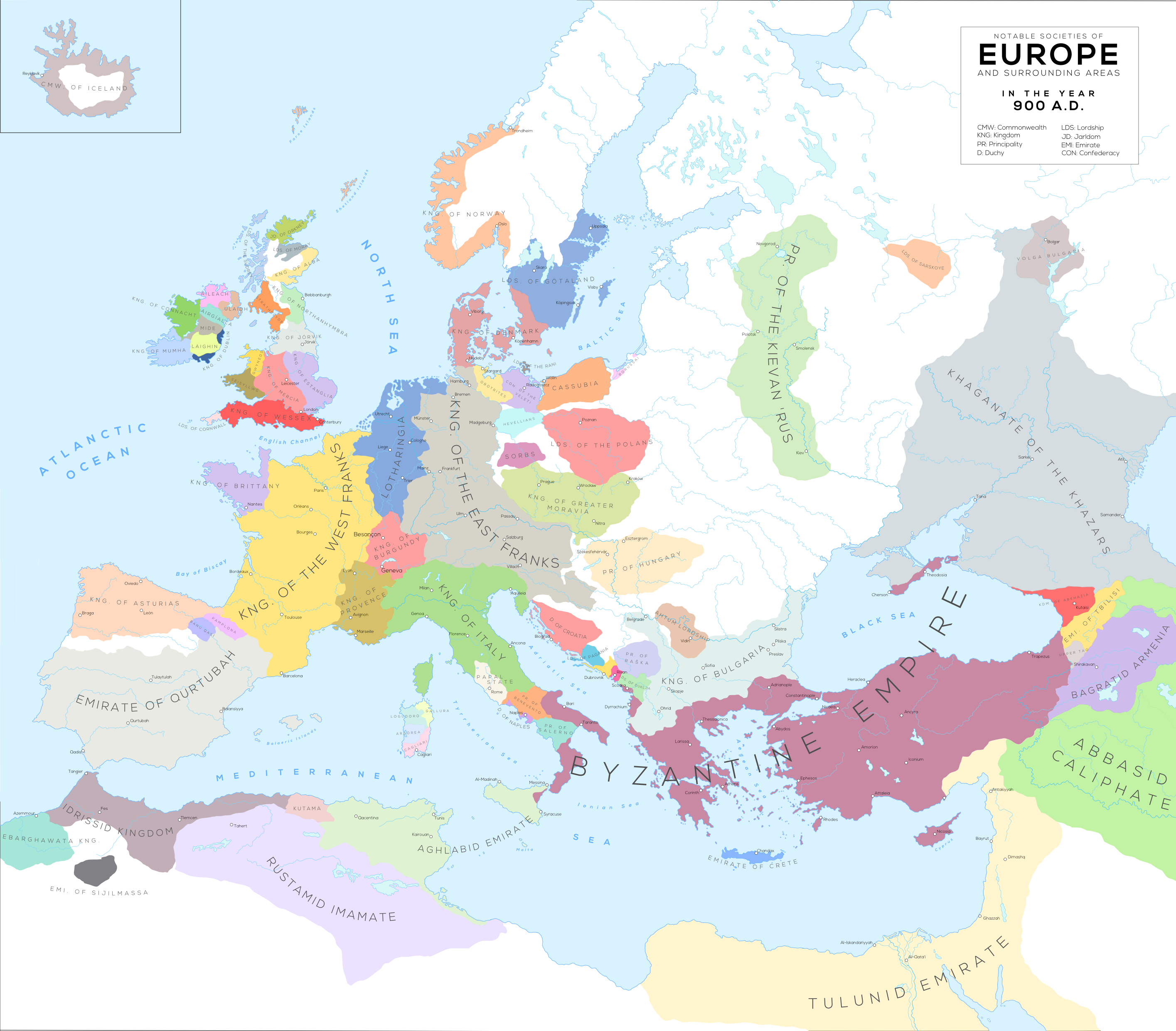
Map of Europe in 900, showing Great Moravia and its neighbors

A letter of Theotmar of Salzburg and his suffragans evidences that around 900 the Moravians and the Bavarians accused each other of having formed alliances, even by taking oaths "by the means of a dog and a wolf and through other abominable and pagan customs", with the Hungarians. According to Liudprand of Cremona, the Hungarians already "claimed for themselves the nation of the Moravians, which King Arnulf had subdued with the aid of their might" at the coronation of Arnulf's son, Louis the Child, in 900. The Annals of Grado adds that a large Hungarian army "attacked and invaded" the Moravians in 900. Facing the threat of further Hungarian attacks, Mojmír II concluded a peace treaty with Louis the Child in 901.

Due to the lack of documentary evidence, the year in which Moravia ceased to exist cannot be determined with certainty. Róna-Tas writes that the Hungarians occupied Moravia in 902, Victor Spinei says that this happened in 903 or 904, while according to Spiesz, the Moravian state ceased to exist in 907. The Raffelstetten Customs Regulations, which was issued in the years 903–906, still refers to the "markets of the Moravians", suggesting that Moravia still existed at that time. It is without doubt that no Moravian forces fought in the battle at Brezalauspurc, where the Hungarians routed a large Bavarian force in 907.

The Moravian land, according to the prophecy of the holy archbishop Methodius, was promptly punished by God for their lawlessness and heresy, for the banishment of the orthodox fathers, and for the torments inflicted on the latter by the heretics with whom they acquiesced. In a few years the Magyars came, a people of Peonia, sacked their land and devastated it. But [Methodius's disciples] were not captured by the Magyars for they fled to the Bulgarians. However, the land remained desolate under the rule of the Magyars.

— First Legend of Saint Naum

== State and society ==
=== Sources ===
Written sources from the 9th century contain almost no information on the internal affairs of Moravia. Only two legal texts—the Nomocanon and the Court Law for the People—have been preserved. The former is a translation of a collection of Byzantine ecclesiastical law; the latter is based on the 8th-century Byzantine law code known as Ekloge ton nomon. Both were completed by Methodius shortly before his death in 885.

In addition to the study of early medieval chronicles and charters, archaeological research contributed to the understanding of the Moravian state and society. The Moravian centres at Mikulčice, Pohansko and Staré Město were thoroughly excavated in the 1950s and 1960s. However, as Macháček writes, "the acquired huge amounts of finds and data still have to be properly processed".

=== Settlement structure ===
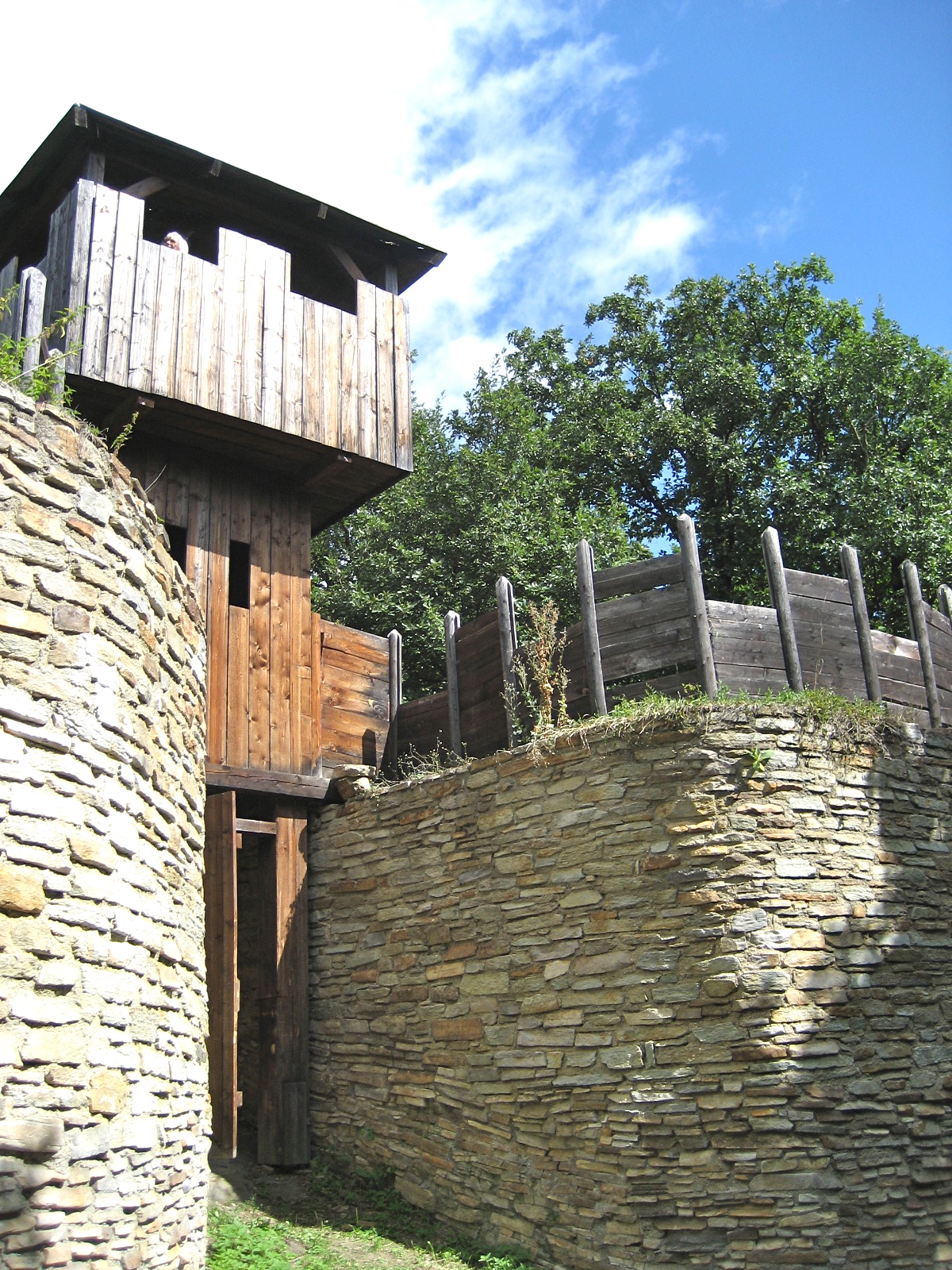
Reconstruction of a Great Moravian gatehouse and ramparts in Thunau am Kamp, Austria

The nuclei of the Great Moravian settlement structure were well-defended fortified settlements built by the local Slavs both on elevated positions and lowland areas like marshes and river islands. Most Great Moravian castles were rather large hill forts, fortified by wooden palisades, stone walls and in some cases, moats. The typical Great Moravian ramparts combined an outer drystone wall with an internal timber structure filled with earth.The fortifications usually formed several contiguous enclosures, with the elite buildings concentrated in the centre and crafts in the outer enclosures. Most buildings were made of timber, but ecclesiastical buildings and residential dwellings were made of stone. In many cases, prehistoric fortifications were also integrated. The Great Moravian towns, especially in Moravia, but also in the lowlands of Slovakia, were frequently far from the place where the stone was mined and material was transported dozens of kilometres. (Note: Mikulčice 50 km, Staré Město 20 km. The remains of the prestigious building on the castle hill in Nitra contained luxury limestone from Austria.)

The Great Moravian settlements can be divided into four main categories. The most important were localities with central functions like Mikulčice-Valy, Staré Město – Uherské Hradiště and Nitra, where several castles and settlements formed a huge fortified (pre-)urban agglomeration. Along with the main centres, the system of fortified settlements included fortified regional administrative hubs, forts whose primary function was defence, and refuge forts which were not inhabited permanently but were used in the case of danger. The largest forts were usually protected by a chain of smaller forts. Smaller forts were also built to protect trade routes and to provide shelter for peasants in case of attack. The existence of noble courts like in Ducové and in other places is also documented. Their form was probably inspired by Carolingian estates called curtis.

In 9th-century Mikulčice, the central fortified area, or Acropolis, was set on an island in the Morava and surrounded by a stone-faced rampart that enclosed an area of six hectares (extensive extramural settlement of 200 hectares stood unfortified). Although the location of the Great Moravian capital, "Veligrad", has not been identified, Mikulčice with its palace and 12 churches is the most widely accepted candidate. An important settlement was a large agglomeration in Pohansko near Břeclav. Nitra, the centre of the eastern part of the Empire, was ruled autonomously by the heir of the dynasty as an appanage. Nitra consisted of several large fortified settlements with various functions and approximately twenty specialized craftsmen's villages, making it a real metropolis of its time. Crafts included a production of luxury goods, such as jewelry and glass. The agglomeration was surrounded by a number of smaller forts.

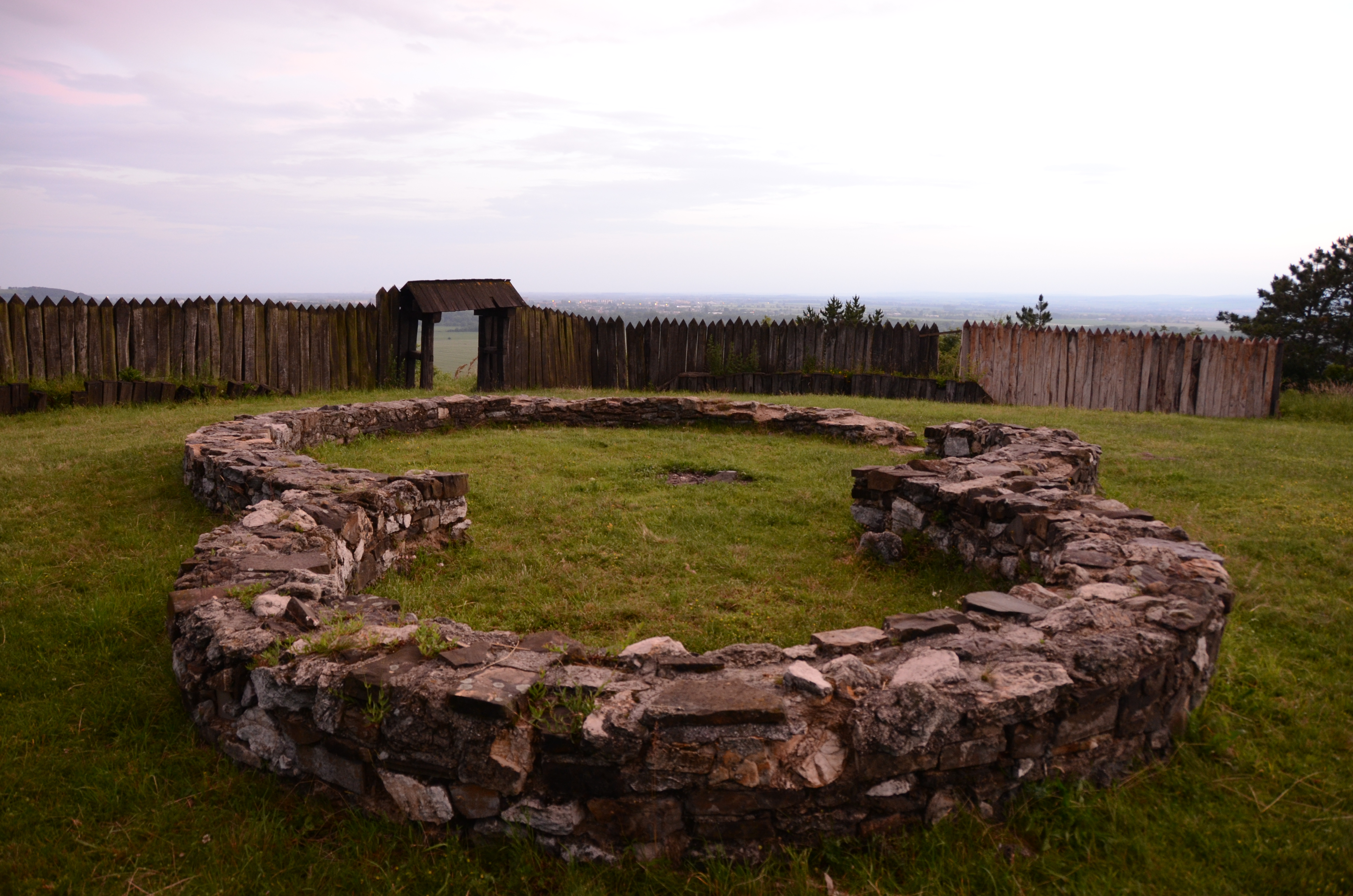
Foundations of a pre-Romanesque rotunda at the Great Moravian court in Ducové

Bratislava Castle had a stone two-story palace and a spacious three-nave basilica, built in the mid-9th century. Excavations of the cemetery situated by the basilica uncovered examples of Great Moravian jewelry, similar in style and quality to that from Mikulčice. The castle's name was first recorded in 907, during the fall of Great Moravia, as Brezalauspurc. This name literally means either "Predslav's Castle" after a son of Svatopluk I who is mentioned in the Cividale del Friuli, or "Braslav's Castle" after Braslav of Pannonia, who was a count appointed by King Arnulf (Arnulf of Carantania) of East Francia. The agglomeration of several fortified settlements was unearthed in Slovak Bojná, discovering important artifacts related to Christianization of the territory. Numerous castles were built on the hills around the valleys of the Váh and the river Nitra, and also in other areas (e.g., Detva, Zeplín, Čingov), but were not built in south-eastern Slovakia.

The sturdy Devín Castle, in vicinity of Bratislava, guarded Great Moravia against attacks from the West. Although some authors claim that it was built only later as a stronghold of the Kings of Hungary, excavations have unearthed an older Slavic fortified settlement founded in the 8th century. During the Great Moravian period, Devín Castle was a seat of a local lord, whose retainers were buried around a stone Christian church. These two castles were reinforced by smaller fortifications in Devínska Nová Ves, Svätý Jur and elsewhere. Another example is the fortress at Thunau am Kamp near Gars am Kamp, overlooking the river Kamp in Lower Austria. The defences here re-utilised banked defences of the Bronze Age and were only slightly smaller (fifty acres) than the area of the contemporary Frankish Emperor's capital of Regensburg.

The number of forts discovered exceeds the number recorded in the sources (11 centres of Moravians and 30 centres of "other Moravians" or Merehanos; opinions differ as to how to interpret the reference to Merehanos). Though the only castles which are mentioned by name in written texts are Nitrawa (828; identified with Nitra), Dowina (864; sometimes identified with Devín Castle) and perhaps Brezalauspurc (907; sometimes identified with Bratislava Castle), some sources claim that Uzhhorod in Ukraine (903) was also a Moravian fortress. Devín Castle is sometimes identified with a "fortress of Prince Rastislav" mentioned in the Annales Fuldenses.

=== Monarchs ===
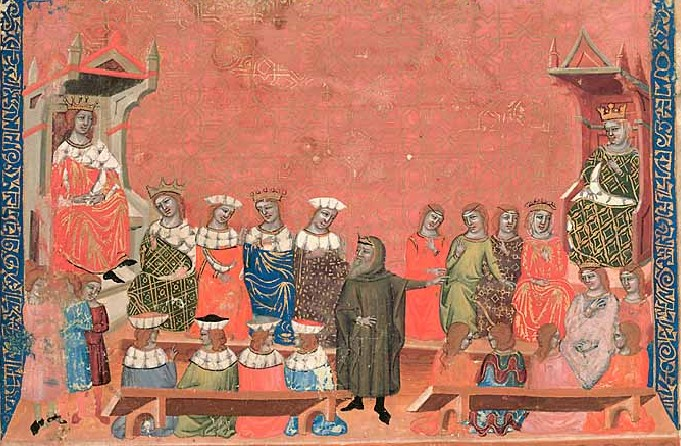
Svatopluk I disguised as a monk in the court of Arnulf, King of East Francia (from the 14th-century Chronicle of Dalimil)

Moravia was ruled by monarchs from a "wider kinship" known as the House of Mojmir. The throne rarely passed from father to son. Actually, Svatopluk I was the only ruler who was succeeded by his son. Rastislav ascended the throne through the East Frankish monarch's intervention, and Slavomir was elected as duke when the Franks captured Svatopluk in 871. The latter case reveals the strong claim of the Mojmir dynasty to the throne, because Slavomir was an ordained priest at the time of his election. The Moravian monarchs were regularly styled as ducis ("dukes"), occasionally as regis ("kings") or maliks ("kings") in 9th-century documents. Tombs within a church have only been discovered at Mikulčice, implying that royals had an exclusive right to be buried in such a prestigious place.

=== Administration ===
The Annals of Fulda never refers to the Moravian monarchs as rulers of a state, but as heads of a people—dux Maravorum ("duke of the Moravians"). Accordingly, Macháček writes that "Great Moravia was not primarily organized on a territorial basis [...], but more likely on the foundation of real or fictitious kinship bonds within the tribal structure". On the other hand, Havlík says that Moravia was divided into counties each headed by "rich, honourable and well-born noblemen" whom he styles as zhupans; he even adds that the number of counties increased from 11 to 30 by the second half of the 9th century. Štefan adds that the existence of scattered groups of farmer warriors, which is suggested by archaeological research, implies the existence of administrative territorial units, because without such a system the monarchs could not organize their campaigns.

Svatopluk incorporated a number of Slavic tribes (including the Bohemians and Vistulans) into his empire. The subjugated tribes were administered by vassal princes or governors, but they preserved their autonomy, which contributed to the quick disintegration of Svatopluk's Moravia after his death. According to Bartl, Kirschbaum, Štefan, and other historians, Great Moravia had two centres. According to Havlík the terms "Moravian lands" (Moravьskskyję strany), "Upper Moravias" (vyšnьnii Moravě, vyšnьneję Moravy) and "Moravian realms" (regna Marahensium, regna Marauorum) which were used in 9th-century documents refer to the dualistic organisation of the Moravian state, consisting of the "Realm of Rastislav" (regnum Rastizi) and the "Realm of Svatopluk" (regnum Zwentibaldi). He and other historians identify the former with modern Moravia in the Czech Republic, and the latter with the Principality of Nitra in present-day Slovakia. However, this view is not universally accepted: Svatopluk's realm has also been identified with the wider region of Staré Město, or with the lands between the Danube and the Tisza or east of the Tisza.

=== Warfare ===
The known sources contain records about 65 events related to warfare and Great Moravia. The most detailed are the Frankish sources during Svatopluk's reign. The structure of the Great Moravian army was based mainly on an early feudal conception of military service, performed primarily by the ruling elites.

The core of the Great Moravian army was a princely retinue comprising professional warriors, who were responsible for collecting tribute and punishing wrongdoers (družina). The družina consisted of members of the aristocracy ("older retinue") and members of the princely military groups ("younger retinue"). Some of its members formed a permanent armed guard for the prince, while the rest were garrisoned at forts or at other strategic points. The družina was probably relatively loyal and provided stable support for the prince since there is no known record of any dissatisfaction with it or of any uprising. The permanent part of the army had an expressly cavalry character. The Great Moravian heavy cavalry emulated the contemporary Frankish predecessors of knights, with the expensive equipment that only the highest social strata could afford (a contemporary Arab traveller, Ahmad ibn Fadlan, reported that Svatopluk I had plenty of cavalry horses). The overall size of the družina is estimated by Ruttkay at 3,000–5,000 men. In the case of larger mobilisations, cavalry was reinforced by additional smaller units recruited from the retinues of local magnates and from traditional communities (občina). The second element of the army (pohotovosť) consisted of lower classes of free citizens who were not, in most cases, professional warriors. However, thanks to their large numbers and knowledge of the prevalent types of weapons they represented a serious military force. They played a decisive role mainly in the defence of Great Moravian territory; their participation in wars of expansion was less common. The army was led by the prince or, in his absence, by a commander-in-chief called a voivode. The maximum size of the army is estimated at 20,000–30,000 men. In case of external aggression, ordinary people participated in defence and diversion actions. An important element of the defence of Great Moravia was a system of strong fortifications, which were difficult to besiege with the then prevailing forms of military organization. For example, a Frankish chronicler wrote with awe about the size of Rastislav's fortress ("firmissimum, ut feritur, vallum").

The typical weapon of a West Slavic foot soldier was an axe of a specific shape, called a bradatica. Spears were universally used by both infantry and cavalry. The weapons associated with a nomadic (Avar) culture, like sabres, reflexion bows and specific types of spears are missing. On the other hand, a military equipment became more influenced by western types and new types of weapons like double-edged swords (rare before the 9th century) became popular. Archers, unlike the previous period, were already a part of the infantry.

=== Aristocracy ===
The existence of a local aristocracy is well documented: contemporaneous sources refer to "leading men" (optimates or primates), and nobiles viri or principes. However, these documents do not reveal the basis of the Moravian chiefs' power. Richly furnished graves—with the exception of the one at Blatnica, which is "an old and disputable find", according to Štefan—have only been unearthed in Mikulčice and other large fortifications controlled by the monarchs. Štefan writes that the concentration of prestige goods in the towns shows that "immediate contact with the sovereign, who certainly travelled between the centres, was apparently the best winning strategy for the top elite". On the other hand, the optimates had an important role in the government: the monarchs did not make important decisions without discussing them in a council formed by the Moravian "dukes".

=== Population ===
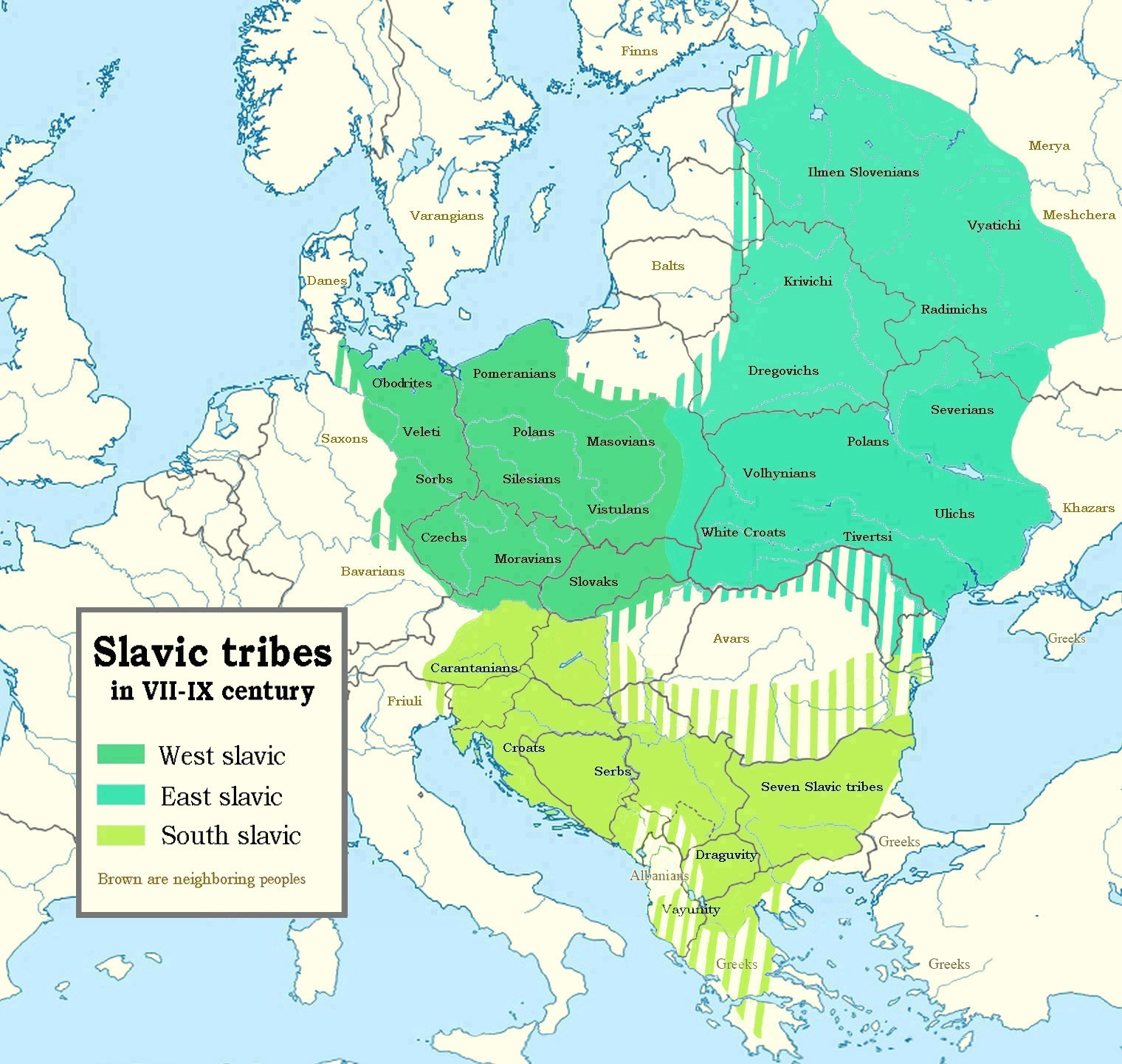
Map showing the distribution of Slavic tribes between the 7th–9th centuries AD

Great Moravia was inhabited by the West Slavic subgroup of the larger Slavic ethno-linguistical group. The West Slavs have their origin in early Slavic tribes which settled in Central Europe after East Germanic tribes had largely left this area during the migration period, while the West Slavs "assimilated the remaining Celtic and Germanic populations" in the area.

Moravians had strong cultural ties to their western neighbors, the Franks, with certain objects proving Carolingian influence. The archaeological evidence demonstrates that the 9th-century material culture found in modern Moravia was very much in the Frankish sphere and showed minor Byzantine influence.

Carolingian influence affected all spheres of life in Great Moravia. After the Carolingian Empire was divided, the Ottonian dynasty took over and continued and cultivated Carolingian traditions. It is not accidental that the newly created medieval West-Slavonic states borrow from Carolingian tradition via the Ottonian Empire.

Most of the population was formed by freemen, who were obliged to pay an annual tax. Slavery and feudal dependency are also recorded.

The analysis of early medieval cemeteries in Moravia shows that 40 percent of men and 60 percent of women died before reaching the age of 40. More than 40 percent of the graves contained the remains of children aged one to twelve. However, the cemeteries also document rich nutrition and advanced health care. For instance, a third of the examined skeletons had no caries or lost teeth, and bone fractures healed without dislocation.

== Economy ==
The large 9th-century fortresses unearthed at Mikulčice and other places were located in the wider region of the confluence of the rivers Morava and Danube. Two important trade routes crossed this region in this period, the Danube and the ancient Amber Road, implying that these settlements, all lying on rivers, were important centres of commerce. Finds of tools, raw materials and semi-manufactured goods show that quarters inhabited by craftsmen also existed in these settlements. The large fortresses were surrounded by a number of small villages where the locals were engaged in agriculture. They cultivated wheat, barley, millet and other cereals, and farmed cattle, pigs, sheep and horse. Their animals were relatively small: for instance, their horses were not larger than modern Przewalski horses.

The existence of a general exchange medium in Moravia has not been proven: there is no sign of local coinage and foreign coins are scarce. According to Bialeková and other archaeologists, the axe-shaped ingots (grivnas) unearthed in great number in fortresses served as "premonetary currencies". This theory has not universally been accepted, because these objects have also been interpreted as "intermediate products intended for further treatment". According to Macháček, the lack of coins meant that Moravian monarchs could not "effectively collect taxes, customs and fines", which weakened their international position.

Iron metallurgy and smithing were the most important branches of local industry. An example of highly developed tool production are asymmetrical plowshares. There is no sign of silver, gold, copper or lead mines in Moravia, but jewellery and weapons were produced locally. Accordingly, their prime material was acquired as loot or gift or brought to Moravia by merchants. Archaeological research also evidences the import of prestige goods, including silk, brocade and glass vessels. According to Štefan and Macháček, the Moravians primarily provided slaves, acquired as prisoners of war during their raids in the neighbouring regions, in exchange for these luxury goods. For instance, Archbishop Thietmar of Salzburg accused the Moravians of "bringing noble men and honest women into slavery" during their campaigns in Pannonia. Slave trading is also well documented: the First Legend of Naum narrates that many of Methodius's disciples "were sold for money to the Jews" after 885, and the Raffelstetten Customs Regulations makes mention of slaves delivered from Moravia to the west.

== Culture ==
=== Sacral architecture ===
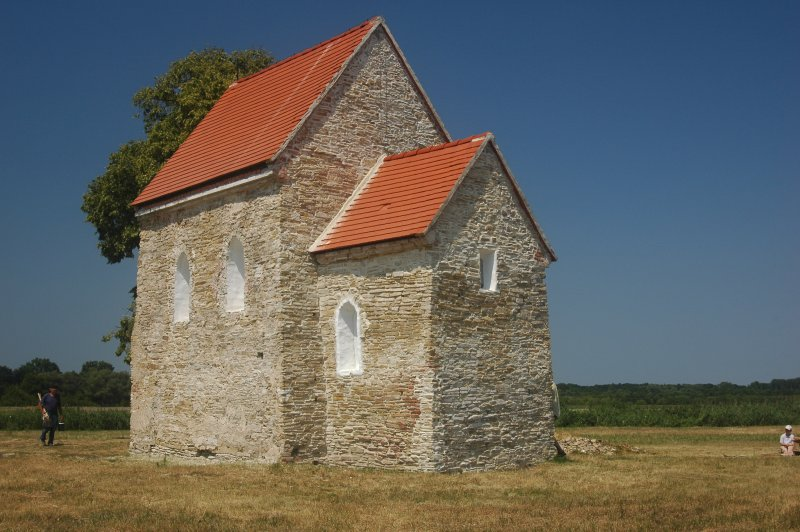
Church of St. Margaret of Antioch in Kopčany, Slovakia, one of remaining buildings for which the Great Moravian origin is considered

The views on Great Moravian sacral architecture changed dramatically during the second half of the 20th century. At first, researchers assumed it to be limited to simple wooden churches like those known from the German environment in dating from the 7th to 8th centuries. These wooden churches were suitable for initial missionary activities due to the easy availability of materials, quick construction and no need for consecration. This opinion was refined in 1949 after excavations in Staré Město. From the 1960s, stone churches have also been excavated in Slovakia. As of 2014, more than 25 sacral buildings have been safely identified in the core territory of Great Moravia (Moravia and Western Slovakia). The remains of the first uncovered churches were only "negatives" (ditches filled with secondary material after removal of original foundations), but later research also uncovered remains of buildings with original foundations. Especially after the discovery of Great Moravian graves near the church in Kopčany, the potential Great Moravian origin of several still-standing churches in Slovakia (viz., Kopčany, Nitrianska Blatnica, Kostoľany pod Tribečom) was once more an open question. The exact dating is a goal of ongoing research based on radiocarbon analysis and dendrochronology.

Great Moravian sacral architecture is represented by a rich variety of types, from three-nave basilicas (Mikulčice III, Bratislava), triconcha (Devín), simple rotunda without apses (Mikulčice VII), two-apse rotunda (Mikulčice VI), tetraconchic rotunda (Mikulčice IX) and a whole group of one-nave churches and rotundas with one apse. The largest number of churches has been found in south-eastern Moravia. Mikulčice, with twelve churches, clearly dominates among all other localities with the first stone churches built around 800 (a potential thirteenth church is Kopčany, on the Slovak side of the border). The three-nave basilica from Mikulčice, which has interior dimensions of 35 m by 9 m and a separate baptistery, is the largest sacral building found to date. The high concentration of churches in Mikululčice exceeded the needs of the local population, and so are believed to be proprietary churches (Eigenkirchen), known also in Francia. Large churches were also important ecclesiastical centres. The current dating of several churches precedes the Byzantine mission. The churches were decorated mostly by frescoes, but usage of secco is also documented. The authors were probably foreign artists from Francia and northern Italy (the latter indicated by, for example, the chemical composition of paintings in Bratislava and Devín).

Great Moravian sacral architecture was probably influenced by Frankish, Dalmatian-Istrian, Byzantine and classical architecture, which also indicated complex missionary activities. Two open-air museums, in Modrá near Uherské Hradiště and in Ducové, are devoted to Great Moravian architecture.

=== Religion ===
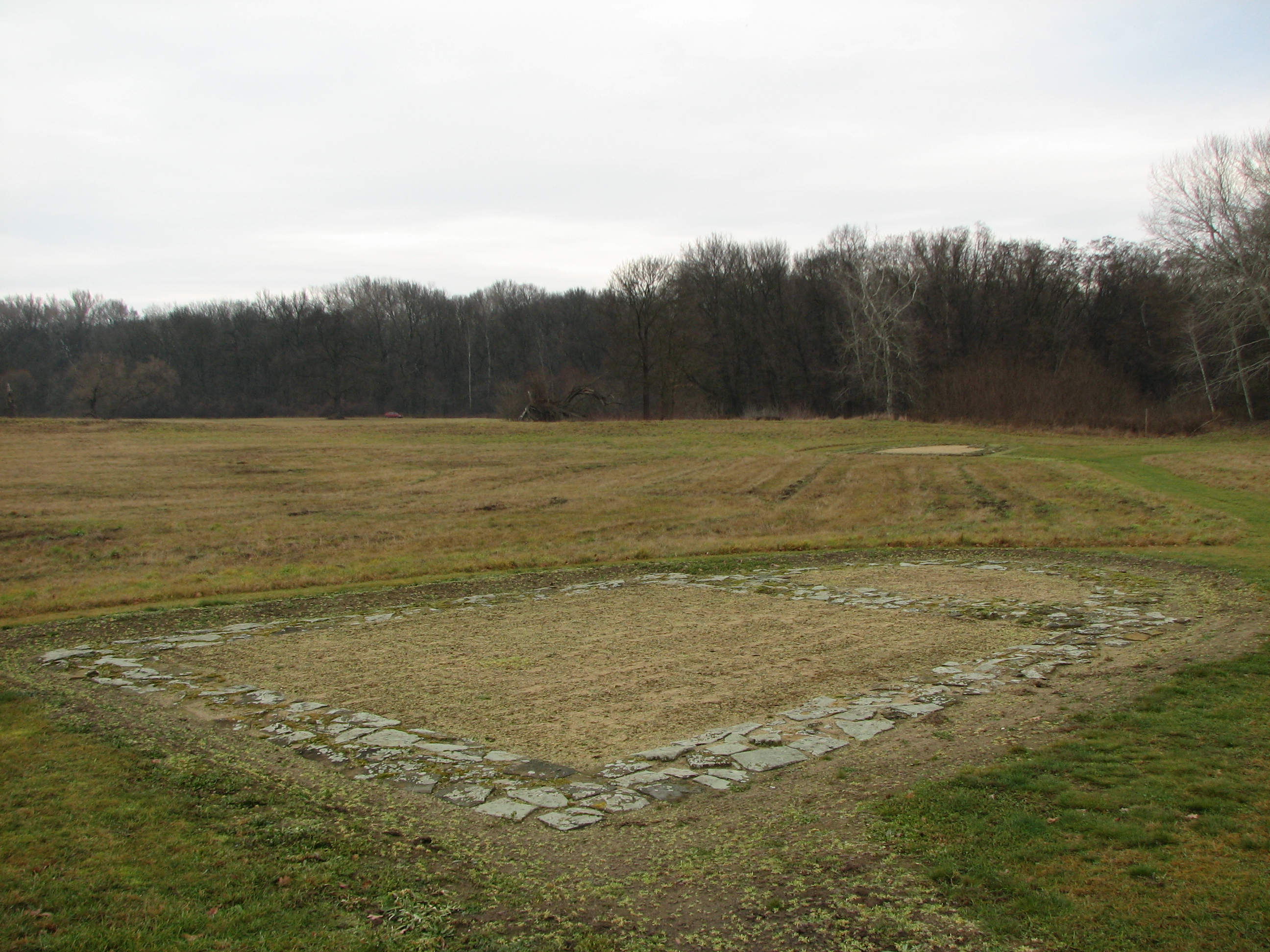
Stone foundations of a church in Valy u Mikulčic, Czech Republic

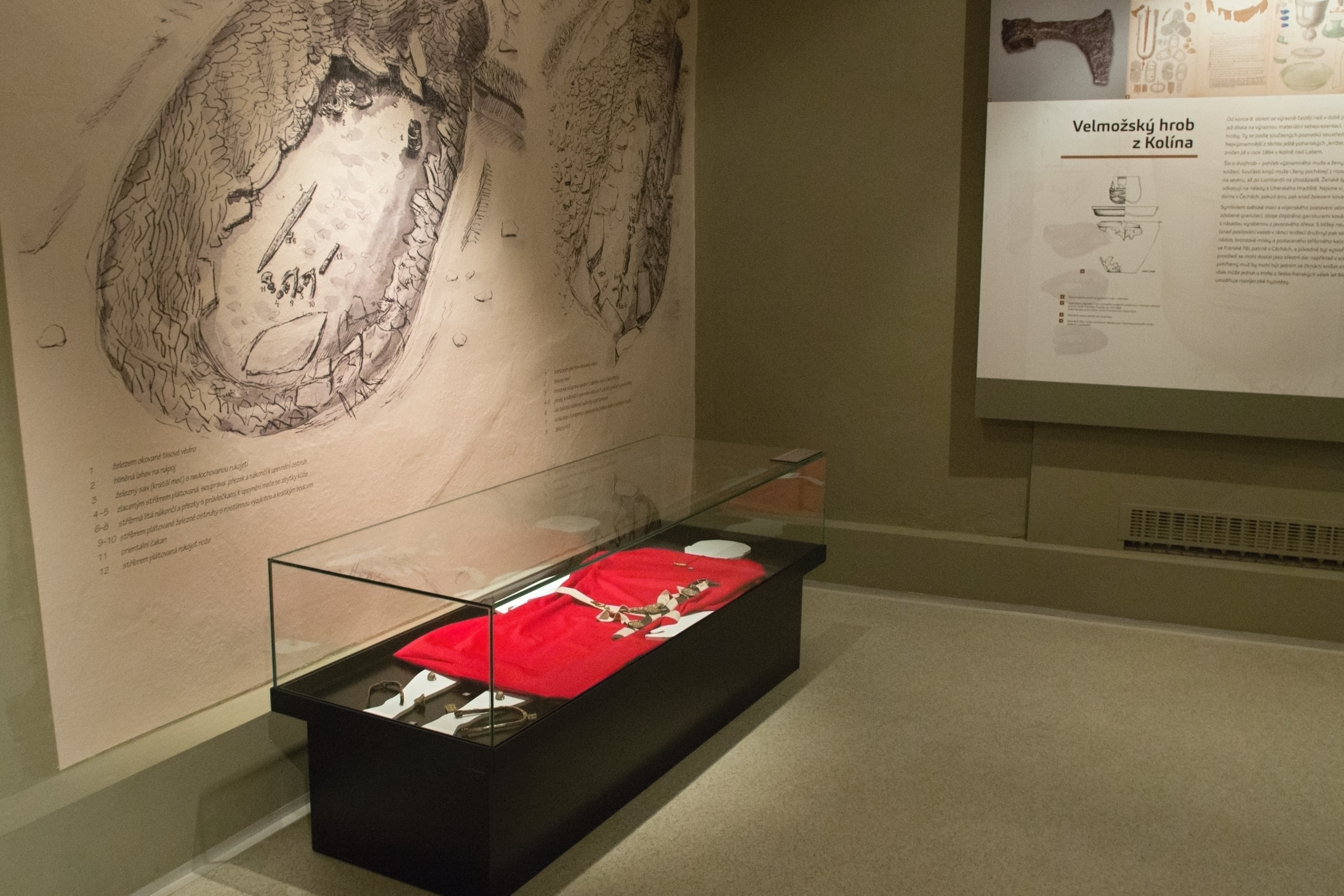
Exhibition Among the tribes and the state. Room with the Early medieval princely burial from Kolín (Starý Kolín), 850–900 AD

Like other Slavs, the Great Moravian Slavs originally practised a polytheistic religion with an ancestor cult. Several cult places used prior to the Christianization of Moravia have been found in Moravia (Mikulčice and Pohansko). However, we do not know what these objects, such as a ring ditch with a fire, a horse sacrifice, or human limbs ritually buried in a cemetery, meant to Great Moravians. An alleged (Note: The existence of the alleged circular pagan shrine in Mikulčice was questioned in 2012. (Mazuch 2012)) cult object in Mikulčice was reportedly used until the evangelization of the Moravian elite in the mid-9th century and idols in Pohansko were raised on the site of a demolished church during the pagan backlash in the 10th century. The only Slavic pagan shrine found in modern Slovakia is an object in Most pri Bratislave dedicated probably to the god of war and thunder Perun. The shrine was abandoned in the mid-9th century and never restored.

The spread of Christianity had several stages and it is still an open research question. In older publications, the first organized missions were attributed mainly to Hiberno-Scottish missionaries, but modern works are more sceptical about their direct influence. The territory of Great Moravia was originally evangelized by missionaries coming from the Frankish Empire or Byzantine enclaves in Italy and Dalmatia from the early 8th century and sporadically earlier. Traces of an Aquileia-Dalmatic mission are found in Great Moravian architecture and language. Northern Italian influence is assumed also for golden plaques with Christian motifs from Bojná (probably from a portable altar), which belong to the most important Christian artefacts dated prior to the mission of Saints Cyril and Methodius. Especially after the defeat of the Avars at the end of the 8th century, Frankish missionaries became the most important part of organized missions. The first Christian church of the Western and Eastern Slavs known from written sources was built in 828 by Pribina in Nitra and consecrated by Bishop Adalram of Salzburg. Most of the territory was Christianized until the mid-9th century. Despite the formal endorsement by the elites, Great Moravian Christianity was described as containing many pagan elements as late as 852. Grave goods, such as food, could be found even in church graveyards. The Church organization in Great Moravia was supervised by the Bavarian clergy until the arrival of the Byzantine missionaries Saints Cyril and Methodius in 863.

In 880, the pope ordained a Swabian monk, Wiching, as bishop of the newly established see of Nitra ("sancta ecclesia Nitriensis"). Some experts (e.g., Szőke Béla Miklós) say that the location of the seat of 9th century diocese is different from present-day Nitra.

=== Literature ===
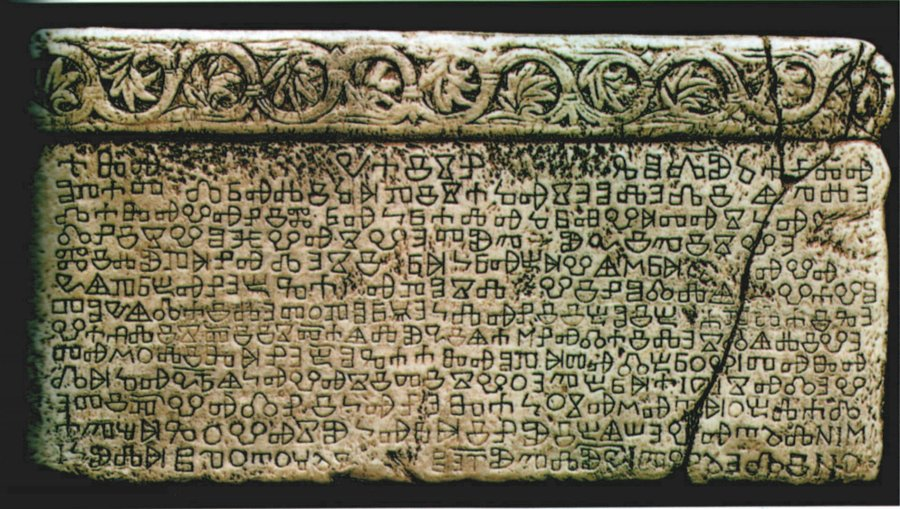
An example of the Glagolitic script created by Saint Cyril for the mission in Great Moravia (Baščanska ploča from Croatia). The inscribed stone slab records Croatian king Zvonimir's donation of a piece of land to a Benedictine abbey in the time of abbot Drzhiha.

The impact of the mission of Cyril and Methodius extended beyond the religious and political spheres. Old Church Slavonic became the fourth liturgical language of the Christian world. However, after Methodius's death (885) all his followers were expelled from Great Moravia; accordingly, the use of Slavic liturgy in Great Moravia lasted only about 22 years. Its late form remains the liturgical language of the Ukrainian, Russian, Bulgarian, Macedonian, Serbian and Polish Orthodox Churches. Cyril also invented the Glagolitic alphabet, suitable for Slavic languages, and first translated the Bible into a Slavic language, along with Methodius, who later completed the project.

Methodius wrote the first Slavic legal code, combining local customary law with advanced Byzantine law. Similarly, the Great Moravian criminal law code was not merely a translation from Latin, but also punished a number of offenses originally tolerated by pre-Christian Slavic mores, yet prohibited by Christianity (mostly related to sexual conduct). The canon law was simply adopted from Byzantine sources.

There are not many literary works that can be unambiguously identified as originally written in Great Moravia. One of them is Proglas, a cultivated poem in which Cyril defends the Slavic liturgy. Vita Cyrilli (attributed to Clement of Ohrid) and Vita Methodii (probably written by Methodius's successor Gorazd) are biographies with valuable information about Great Moravia under Rastislav and Svatopluk I.

The brothers also founded an academy, initially led by Methodius, which produced hundreds of Slavic clerics. A well-educated class was essential for administration of all early-feudal states and Great Moravia was no exception. Vita Methodii mentions that the bishop of Nitra served as Svatopluk I's chancellor, and even Prince Koceľ of the Balaton Principality was said to have mastered the Glagolitic script. The location of the Great Moravian academy has not been identified, but possible sites include Mikulčice (where some styli have been found in an ecclesiastical building), Devín Castle (with a building identified as a probable school) and Nitra (with its Episcopal basilica and monastery). When Methodius's disciples were expelled from Great Moravia by Svatopluk I in 885, they disseminated their knowledge (including the Glagolitic script) to other Slavic countries, such as Bulgaria, Croatia and Bohemia. The Cyrillic script was created in Bulgaria in the Preslav Literary School, which became the standard alphabet the Bulgarian Empire and later in the Kievan Rus' (modern day Russia, Ukraine and Belarus). The Great Moravian cultural heritage was further developed in Bulgarian seminaries, paving the way for the Christianization of Kievan Rus'.

The Cyrillo-Methodian cultural mission had significant impact on most Slavic languages and stood at the beginning of the modern Cyrillic alphabet, created in the 9th century AD in Bulgaria by Bulgarian disciples of Cyril and Methodius (Naum of Preslav, Clement of Ohrid and others).

=== Arts ===
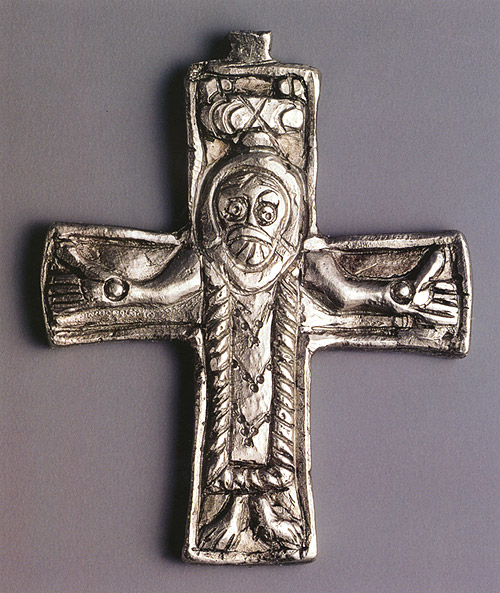
A silver cross from Mikulčice

In the first half of the 9th century, Great Moravian craftsmen were inspired by contemporary Carolingian art. In the second half of the 9th century, Great Moravian jewelry was influenced by Byzantine, Eastern Mediterranean and Adriatic styles. In the words of Czech archaeologist Josef Poulík, "these new forms and techniques were not copied passively, but were transformed in the local idiom, establishing in this way the roots of the distinctive Great Moravian jewellery style." However, recent research has also shown that Great Moravia was part of different cultural circles in terms of material culture and shared many types of objects with neighbouring regions. The impression that the Moravian craftsmen alone created an influential jewellery style could therefore simply be based on the fact that there are a particularly large number of well-researched graves there. Typical Great Moravian jewelry included silver and golden earrings decorated by fine granular filigree, as well as silver and gilded bronze buttons covered by foliate ornaments.

== Legacy ==
Great Moravian centres (e.g., Bratislava (Pozsony, Pressburg), Nitra (Nyitra), Tekov (Bars) and Zemplín (Zemplén)) retained their functions after the fall of Great Moravia, although the identification of Bratislava, Tekov and Zemplín as Great Moravian castles are not generally accepted. Several sources suggest that Hungarian rulers followed the contemporary German or Bulgar patents when they established the new administrative system in their kingdom, or they introduced a new system.

Social differentiation in Great Moravia reached the state of early feudalism, creating the social basis for development of later medieval states in the region. The question what happened to Great Moravian noble families after 907 is still under debate. On the one hand, recent research indicates that a significant part of the local aristocracy remained more or less undisturbed by the fall of Great Moravia and their descendants became nobles in the newly formed Kingdom of Hungary. The most prominent example are the powerful families of Hunt and Pázmán. On the other hand, both Anonymous and Simon of Kéza, two chroniclers of the early history of Hungary, recorded that the prominent noble families of the kingdom descended either from leaders of the Magyar tribes or from immigrants, and they did not connect any of them to Great Moravia. For example, the ancestors of the clan Hunt-Pázmán (Hont-Pázmány), whose Great Moravian origin has been advanced by Slovak scholars, were reported by Simon of Kéza to have arrived from the Duchy of Swabia in the late 10th century.

The territories mentioned as "Tercia pars regni" (lit., "one-third part of the Kingdom of Hungary") in the medieval sources are referred to as the "Duchy" in Hungarian scholarly works and as the "Principality of Nitra" in Slovak academic sources. These territories were ruled autonomously by members of the Árpád dynasty residing in Bihar (today Biharea in Romania) or in Nitra—a practice reminiscent of the Great Moravian appanage system, but also similar to that of some other dynasties in the Early Middle Ages (e.g., the Ruriks in the Kievan Rus'). The existence of an autonomous political unit centered around Nitra is often considered by Slovak scholars an example of political continuity from the Great Moravian period.

Great Moravia also became a prominent theme of the Czech and Slovak romantic nationalism of the 19th century. The Byzantine double-cross thought to have been brought by Cyril and Methodius is currently part of the symbol of Slovakia and the Constitution of Slovakia refers to Great Moravia in its preamble. Interest about that period rose as a result of the national revival in the 19th century. Great Moravian history has been regarded as a cultural root of several Slavic nations in Central Europe and it was employed in attempts to create a single Czechoslovak identity in the 20th century.

Although the source cited above and other sources mention that Great Moravia disappeared without trace and that its inhabitants left for the Bulgars, with Croats and Magyars following their victories, archaeological research and toponyms suggest the continuity of Slavic population in the valleys of the rivers of the Inner Western Carpathians. Moreover, there are sporadic references to Great Moravia from later years: in 924/925, both Folkuin in his Gesta abb. Lobiensium and Ruotger in Archiepiscopi Coloniensis Vita Brunonis mention Great Moravia. In 942, Magyar warriors captured during their raid in al-Andalus said that Moravia is the northern neighbour of their people. The fate of the northern and western parts of former Central Europe in the 10th century is thus largely unclear.

The eastern part of the Great Moravian core territory (present-day Slovakia) fell under domination of the Hungarian Árpád dynasty. The north-west borders of the Principality of Hungary became a mostly uninhabited or sparsely inhabited land. This was the Hungarian gyepűelve, and it can be considered as a march that effectively lasted until the mid-13th century. The rest remained under the rule of the local Slavic aristocracy and was gradually integrated into the Kingdom of Hungary in a process finished in the 14th century. In 1000 or 1001, all of present-day Slovakia was taken over by Poland under Bolesław I, and much of this territory became part of the Kingdom of Hungary by 1031.

== See also ==
- History of Moravia
- History of Slovakia
- History of the Czech lands
- Slavs in Lower Pannonia

== Bibliography ==
=== Primary sources ===
- "King Alfred's Anglo-Saxon Version of Orosius" (1852). In Giles, J. A. The Whole Works of King Alfred the Great, with Preliminary Essays Illustrative of the History, Arts, and Manners, of the Ninth Century, Volume 2 (Jubilee Edition, 3 vols). J.F. Smith for the Alfred Committee.
- "Liudprand of Cremona: Retribution" (2007). In: The Complete Works of Liudprand of Cremona (Translated by Paolo Squatriti); The Catholic University of Press; ISBN 978-0-8132-1506-8.
- The Annals of Fulda (Ninth-Century Histories, Volume II) (Translated and annotated by Timothy Reuter) (1992). Manchester University Press. ISBN 0-7190-3458-2.
- The Annals of St-Bertin (Ninth-Century Histories, Volume I) (Translated and annotated by Janet L. Nelson) (1991). Manchester University Press. ISBN 978-0-7190-3426-8.
- The Chronicle of Regino of Prüm (2009). In: History and Politics in Late Carolingian and Ottonian Europe: The Chronicle of Regino of Prüm and Adalbert of Magdeburg (Translated and annotated by Simon MacLean); Manchester University Press; ISBN 978-0-7190-7135-5.
- "The Life of Constantine" (1983). In Medieval Slavic Lives of Saints and Princes (Marvin Kantor) [Michigan Slavic Translation 5]. University of Michigan. pp. 23–96. ISBN 0-930042-44-1.
- "The Life of Methodius" (1983). In Medieval Slavic Lives of Saints and Princes (Marvin Kantor) [Michigan Slavic Translation 5]. University of Michigan. pp. 97–138. ISBN 0-930042-44-1.
- "The Royal Frankish Annals" In Carolingian Chronicles: Royal Frankish Annals and Nithard's Histories (Translated by Bernhard Walter Scholz with Barbara Rogers) (2006). The University of Michigan Press. pp. 35–126. ISBN 0-472-06186-0.

Primary documents can be found in the following volumes:

- Havlík, Lubomír E. (1966–1977). Magnae Moraviae Fontes Historici I.-V., Brno: Masarykova univerzita.
- Marsina, Richard (1971). Codex diplomaticus et epistolaris Slovaciae I., Bratislava: Veda.
- Moravcsik, Gyula, ed. (1967) [1949]. Constantine Porphyrogenitus: De Administrando Imperio (2nd revised ed.). Washington D.C.: Dumbarton Oaks Center for Byzantine Studies. ISBN 9780884020219.
- Ratkoš, Peter (1964). Pramene k dejinám Veľkej Moravy, Bratislava: Vydavateľstvo Slovenskej akadémie vied.

=== Secondary sources ===
- Albrecht, Stefan (2003). Geschichte der Großmährenforschung in den tschechischen Ländern und der Slowakei [History of Great Moravia research in the Czech lands and Slovakia]. Praha: Slovanský ústav.
- Angi, János (1997). "A nyugati szláv államok [=Western Slavic states]". In Pósán, László; Papp, Imre; Bárány, Attila; Orosz, István; Angi, János (eds.). Európa a korai középkorban ["Europe in the Early Middle Ages"]. Multiplex Media - Debrecen University Press. pp. 358–365. ISBN 978-963-04-9196-9.
- Barford, Paul M. (2001). The Early Slavs: Culture and Society in Early Medieval Eastern Europe. Ithaca: Cornell University Press. ISBN 0801439779.
- Benda, Kálmán, ed. (1981). Magyarország történeti kronológiája ("The Historical Chronology of Hungary"). Budapest: Akadémiai Kiadó. ISBN 978-963-05-2661-6.
- Berend, Nora; Urbanczyk, Przemyslaw; Wiszewski, Przemyslaw (2013). Central Europe in the High Middle Ages: Bohemia, Hungary and Poland, c.900–c.1300. Cambridge University Press. ISBN 9780521781565.
- Betti, Maddalena (2013). The Making of Christian Moravia (858-882): Papal Power and Political Reality. Leiden-Boston: Brill. ISBN 9789004260085.
- Boba, Imre (1971). Moravia's History Reconsidered: A Reinterpretation of Medieval Sources. The Hague: Martinus Nijhoff. ISBN 978-90-247-5041-2.
- Boháčová, Ivana; Profantová, Naďa (2014). "Čechy v době velkomoravské". The Cyril and Methodius Mission and Europe: 1150 Years Since the Arrival of the Thessaloniki Brothers in Great Moravia [Bohemia in the Great Moravian Period] (in Czech). Institute of Archaeology of the Academy of Sciences of the Czech Republic. pp. 149–171. ISBN 978-80-86023-51-9. OS LG 2023-08-18.
- Botek, Andrej (2014a). Veľkomoravské kostoly na Slovensku [The Great Moravian Churches in Slovakia] (in Slovak). Bratislava: Post Scriptum. ISBN 978-80-89567-37-9.
- Botek, Andrej (2014b). "Veľkomoravská bazilika na Bratislavskom hrade" [The Greatmoravian Basilica on the Bratislava castle] (PDF). Verbum Historiae (in Slovak) (1).
- Bowlus, Charles R. (1995). Franks, Moravians, and Magyars: The Struggle for the Middle Danube, 788-907. Philadelphia: University of Pennsylvania Press. ISBN 9780812232769.
- Bowlus, Charles R. (2009). "Nitra: when did it become a part of the Moravian realm? Evidence in the Frankish sources". Early Medieval Europe. 17 (3): 311–328. doi:10.1111/j.1468-0254.2009.00279.x. S2CID 161655879.
- Čaplovič, Dušan (1998). Včasnostredoveké osídlenie Slovenska [Early Medieval settlement of Slovakia]. Bratislava: Electronic Academic Press. ISBN 978-80-88880-19-6.
- Champion, Tim (1995). Centre and Periphery: Comparative Studies in Archaeology. Taylor & Francis. ISBN 978-0-203-98515-1.
- Charvát, Petr (2014). "A montibus usque ad mare: Moravia and Venice in the 9th century". The Cyril and Methodius Mission and Europe: 1150 Years Since the Arrival of the Thessaloniki Brothers in Great Moravia. Institute of Archaeology of the Academy of Sciences of the Czech Republic. pp. 234–239. ISBN 978-80-86023-51-9.
- Collins, Roger (2010). Early Medieval Europe, 300-1000. Palgrave Macmillan. ISBN 978-113-7014-28-3.
- Curta, Florin (2006). Southeastern Europe in the Middle Ages, 500–1250. Cambridge: Cambridge University Press.
- Dekan, Ján (1981). Moravia Magna: The Great Moravian Empire, Its Art and Time. Control Data Arts. ISBN 978-0-89893-084-9.
- Drulák, Petr (2012). "Czech geopolitics: struggling for survival". In Guzzini, Stefano (ed.). The Return of Geopolitics in Europe? - Social Mechanisms and Foreign Policy Identity Crises. Cambridge University Press. pp. 77–100. ISBN 978-1-107-02734-3.
- Dvornik, Francis (1948). The Photian Schism: History and Legend. Cambridge, UK: Cambridge University Press.
- Eggers, Martin (1995). Das 'großmährische Reich'. Realität oder Fiktion? Eine Neuinterpretation der Quellen zur Geschichte des mittleren Donauraumes im 9. Jahrhundert [The 'Great Moravian Empire'. Reality or fiction? A reinterpretation of the sources on the history of the Middle Danube region in the 9th century]. Stuttgart: Anton Hiersemann, ISBN 3-7772-9502-7.
- Fine, John Van Antwerp Jr. (1991) [1983]. The Early Medieval Balkans: A Critical Survey from the Sixth to the Late Twelfth Century. Ann Arbor, Michigan: University of Michigan Press. ISBN 0472081497.
- Galuška, Luděk (1991). Great Moravia. Brno: Moravian Museum. ISBN 978-80-7028-023-2.
- Goldberg, Eric J. (2006). Struggle for Empire: Kingship and Conflict under Louis the German, 817-876. Ithaca, NY: Cornell University Press. ISBN 9780801438905.
- Graus, František (1980). Die Nationenbildung der Westslawen im Mittelalter [The nation-building of the Western Slavs in the Middle Ages]. Sigmaringen: Jan Thorbecke, ISBN 3-7995-6103-X.
- Havlík, Lubomír E. (2013). Kronika o Velké Moravě [=Chronicle of Great Moravia]. Jota. ISBN 978-80-85617-04-7.
- Havlík, Lubomír E. (1994). Svatopluk Veliký, král Moravanů a Slovanů [Svatopluk the Great, King of the Moravians and Slavs]. Jota. ISBN 978-80-85617-19-1.
- Havlík, Lubomír E. (2004). "Great Moravia between the Franconians, Byzantium and Rome". In Champion, T. C. (ed.). Centre and Periphery: Comparative Studies in Archaeology. Routledge. pp. 227–237. ISBN 978-0-415-12253-5.
- Hosszú, Gábor (2012). Heritage of Scribes: The Relation of Rovas Scripts to Eurasian Writing Systems. Dr Gábor Hosszú. p. 317. ISBN 9789638843746.
- Kalhous, Daniel (2014). "Some observations on the social structure of Great Moravia". The Cyril and Methodius Mission and Europe: 1150 Years Since the Arrival of the Thessaloniki Brothers in Great Moravia. Institute of Archaeology of the Academy of Sciences of the Czech Republic. pp. 40–47. ISBN 978-80-86023-51-9.
- Kirschbaum, Stanislav J. (2005). A History of Slovakia: The Struggle for Survival (2 ed.). Basingstoke: Macmillan. ISBN 9780333620793.
- Kniezsa, István (2000). Magyarország népei a XI. században. Lucidus Kiadó. ISBN 978-963-85954-3-0.
- Kristó, Gyula (1988). A vármegyék kialakulása Magyarországon ("The formation of counties in Hungary"). Budapest: Magvető Könyvkiadó. ISBN 978-963-14-1189-8.
- Kristó, Gyula, ed. (1994). Korai Magyar Történeti Lexikon (9-14. század) (Encyclopedia of the Early Hungarian History - 9-14th centuries). Budapest: Akadémiai Kiadó. ISBN 978-963-05-6722-0.
- Kristó, Gyula (1996). Hungarian History in the Ninth Century. Szegedi Középkorász Műhely. ISBN 978-1-4039-6929-3.
- Kristó, Gyula (1996a). Magyar honfoglalás - honfoglaló magyarok ("The Hungarians' Occupation of their Country - The Hungarians occupying their Country"). Kossuth Könyvkiadó. ISBN 978-963-09-3836-5.
- Kučera, Matúš (1974). Slovensko po páde Veľkej Moravy, Bratislava: Veda.
- Louth, Andrew (2007). Greek East and Latin West: The Church AD 681–1071. Crestwood, N.Y.: St Vladimir's Seminary Press. ISBN 9780881413205.
- Lukačka, Ján (2002). Formovanie vyššej šľachty na západnom Slovensku, Bratislava: Mistrál.
- Macháček, Jiří (2009). "Disputes over Great Moravia: chiefdom or state? the Morava or the Tisza River?". Early Medieval Europe. 17 (3): 248–267. doi:10.1111/j.1468-0254.2009.00276.x. S2CID 154795263. Archived from the original on 2022-01-07.
- Macháček, Jiří (2012). ""Great Moravian state"–a controversy in Central European medieval studies". Studia Slavica et Balcanica Petropolitana. 11 (1): 5–26. Archived from the original on 2021-05-13.
- McCornick, Michael (2001). Origins of the European Economy: Communications and Commerce, AD 300-900. Cambridge University Press. ISBN 978-0-521-66102-7.
- MacLean, Simon (2003). Kingship and Politics in the Late Ninth Century: Charles the Fat and the End of the Carolingian Empire. Cambridge University Press. ISBN 9781139440295.
- Mahoney, William M. (2011). The History of the Czech Republic and Slovakia. ABC-CLIO. ISBN 9780313363054.
- Marsina, Richard (1997). "Ethnogenesis of Slovaks" (PDF). Human Affairs. 7 (1): 15–23. doi:10.1515/humaff-1997-070103. S2CID 148273682.
- Marsina, Richard (1995). Nové pohľady historickej vedy na Slovenské dejiny. 1. Najstaršie obdobie slovenských dejín (do prelomu 9.-10. storočia) (in Slovak). Bratislava: Metodické centrum mesta Bratislavy. ISBN 978-80-7164-069-1.
- Marsina, Richard (1999). "Najstaršia poloha Veľkej Moravy". Slovensko a európsky juhovýchod: medzikultúrne vztahy a kontexty (zborník k životnému jubileu Tatiany Štefanovicovej) (in Slovak). Bratislava, SLO: Katedra všeobecných dejín a Katedra archeológie FFUK. ISBN 978-8096739141.
- Marsina, Richard (2000). "Where was Great Moravia". In Kováč, Dušan (ed.). Slovak Contributions to 19th International Congress of Historical Sciences. Bratislava: VEDA, Vydavateľstvo Slovenskej akadémie vied. ISBN 978-80-224-0665-9.
- Mazuch, Marian (2012). "K údajné existenci tzv. kruhového pohanského kultovního objektu v podhradí velkomoravského mocenského centra Mikulčice-Valy" [To the Alleged Existence of So-Called Circular Pagan Cultic Feature in the Suburbium of the Great Moravian Center of Power Mikulčice – Valy]. Slavia Antiqua (in Czech). 53 (3). ISSN 0080-9993.
- Měřínský, Zdeněk (2002). České země od příchodu Slovanů po Velkou Moravu II [The Czech Lands since the arrival of the Slavs to Great Moravia] (in Czech). Prague: Libry. ISBN 978-80-7277-105-9.
- Obolensky, Dimitri (1994). Byzantium and the Slavs. St. Vladimir's Seminary Press. ISBN 978-0-88141-008-2.
- Odler, Martin (2012). "Avarské sídliská v strednej Európe: problémová bilancia" [Avar Settlements in Central Europe: the Balance of the Problem]. In Klápště, Jan (ed.). Studia mediaevalia Pragensia 11 (in Slovak). Praha: Univerzita Karlova v Praze – Nakladatelství Karolinum. ISBN 978-80-246-2107-4.
- Ostrogorsky, George (1956). History of the Byzantine State. Oxford: Basil Blackwell. Archived from the original on 2024-09-30.
- Petkov, Kiril (2008). The Voices of Medieval Bulgaria, Seventh-Fifteenth Century: The Records of a Bygone Culture. Brill. ISBN 978-90-04-16831-2.
- Poleski, Jacek (2014). "Contacts between the Great Moravian Empire and the tribes of Lesser Poland – a short episode or common roots?". The Cyril and Methodius Mission and Europe: 1150 Years Since the Arrival of the Thessaloniki Brothers in Great Moravia. Institute of Archaeology of the Academy of Sciences of the Czech Republic. pp. 179–195. ISBN 978-80-86023-51-9. OS LG 2023-08-18.
- Poulík, Josef (1975). Mikulčice: Sídlo a pevnost knížat velkomoravských, Praha.
- Poulík, Josef (1978). "The origins of Christianity in Slavonic countries north of the Middle Danube Basin". World Archaeology. 10 (2): 158–171. doi:10.1080/00438243.1978.9979728.
- Püspöki-Nagy, Péter (1978). "Nagymorávia fekvéséről [=On the location of Great Moravia]". Valóság. XXI (11): 60–82.
- Reinhart, Johannes (2014). "The Heritage of Great Moravia in South Slavonic Literature". The Cyril and Methodius Mission and Europe: 1150 Years Since the Arrival of the Thessaloniki Brothers in Great Moravia. Institute of Archaeology of the Academy of Sciences of the Czech Republic. pp. 350–357. ISBN 978-80-86023-51-9. OS LG 2023-08-18.
- Rogers, Clifford, ed. (2010). The Oxford Encyclopedia of Medieval Warfare and Military Technology, Volume 3. Oxford University Press. ISBN 978-019-5334-03-6.
- Róna-Tas, András (1999). Hungarians and Europe in the Early Middle Ages: An Introduction to Early Hungarian History. CEU Press. ISBN 978-963-9116-48-1.
- Ruttkay, Alexander (1997). "O veľkomoravskom vojenstve s osobitným zreteľom na obdobie vlády Svätopluka" [About the Great Moravian Warfare With a Special Attention to the Reign of Svatopluk]. In Marsina, Richard; Ruttkay, Alexander (eds.). Svätopluk 894 - 1994. Nitra. ISBN 978-80-88709-34-3.
- Ruttkay, Matej (2002). "Vývoj osídlenia na strednom Dunaji v 6.–12. stor" [Development of settlement around the Middle Danube in the 6th-12th cent.]. In Ruttkay, Alexander; Ruttkay, Matej; Šalkovský, Peter (eds.). Slovensko vo včasnom stredoveku. Nitra: Archeologický ústav Slovenskej akadémie vied. ISBN 978-80-88709-60-2.
- Sedlák, Vincent (2005). "Onomastika a historiografia". In Fábrová, Karin (ed.). Príspevky k slovenským dejinám. Prešov. pp. 17–28. ISBN 978-80-8068-330-6.
- Senga, Toru (1983). "Morávia bukása és a honfoglaló magyarok" [The fall of Moravia and the Hungarians occupying the Carpathian Basin]. Századok (in Hungarian) (2): 307–345.
- Sommer, Petr; Třeštík, Dušan; Žemlička, Josef; Opačić, Zoë (2007). "Bohemia and Moravia". Christianization and the Rise of Christian Monarchy: Scandinavia, Central Europe and Rus' c.900–1200 (1. ed.). Cambridge: Cambridge University Press. pp. 214–262. ISBN 9781139468367.
- Spiesz, Anton; Caplovic, Dusan (2006). Illustrated Slovak History: A Struggle for Sovereignty in Central Europe. Bolchazy-Carducci Publishers. ISBN 978-0-86516-426-0.
- Spinei, Victor (2003). The Great Migrations in the East and South East of Europe from the Ninth to the Thirteenth Century. Translated by Dana Badulescu. Romanian Cultural Institute. ISBN 978-973-85894-5-2.
- Steinhübel, Ján (2011a). "The Duchy of Nitra". In Teich, Mikuláš; Kováč, Dušan; Brown, Martin D. (eds.). Slovakia in History. Cambridge University Press. pp. 15–29. ISBN 978-0-521-80253-6.
- Steinhübel, Ján (2011b). Kapitoly z najstarších dejín českých 531–1004 [=Chapters from the oldest Czech history 531–1004]. Spolok Slovákov v Poľsku – Towarzystwo Słowakow w Polsce. ISBN 978-83-7490-370-7.
- Steinhübel, Ján (2016). Nitrianske kniežatstvo. Počiatky stredovekého Slovenska [The Principality of Nitra. The beginnings of medieval Slovakia]. Bratislava: Rak, ISBN 978-80-85501-64-3.
- Štefan, Ivo (2011). "Great Moravia, Statehood and Archaeology: The "Decline and Fall" of One Early Medieval Polity". In Macháček, Jiří; Ungerman, Šimon (eds.). Frühgeschichtliche Zentralorte in Mitteleuropa. Bonn: Verlag Dr. Rudolf Habelt. pp. 333–354. ISBN 978-3-7749-3730-7.
- Štefanovičová, Tatiana (1989). Osudy starých Slovanov [=Fate of the Ancient Slavs]. Osveta.
- Štefanovičová, Tatiana (2000). "K niektorým mýtom o počiatkch našich národných dejín" [To some myths about the beginnings of our national history] (PDF) (in Slovak). Bratislava: Univerzita Komenského. Archived (PDF) from the original on 2021-07-03.
- Senga, Toru (1982). "La situation géographique de la Grande-Moravie et les Hongrois conquérants" [The geographical location of Great Moravia and the Hungarian conquerors]. Jahrbücher für Geschichte Osteuropas (in French). 30 (4). ISSN 0021-4019.
- Škvarna, Dušan; Bartl, Július; Čičaj, Viliam; Kohútova, Mária; Letz, Róbert; Segeš, Vladimír (2002). Slovak History: Chronology & Lexicon. Wauconda: Bolchazy-Carducci Publishers. ISBN 9780865164444.
- Szőke, Béla Miklós (2007). "New findings of the excavations in Mosaburg/Zalavar (Western Hungary)". In Henning, Joachim (ed.). Post-Roman Towns, Trade and Settlement in Europe and Byzantium: The heirs of the Roman West. Walter de Gruyter. pp. 411–428. ISBN 978-3-110-18356-6.
- Tóth, Sándor László (1998). Levediától a Kárpát-medencéig ("From Levedia to the Carpathian Basin"). Szeged: Szegedi Középkorász Műhely. ISBN 978-963-482-175-5.
- Třeštík, Dušan (2010). Vznik Velké Moravy. Moravané, Čechové a štřední Evropa v letech 791–871 [The Formation of Great Moravia. Moravians, Czechs and Central Europe in the years 791-871]. Nakladatelství lidové noviny. ISBN 978-80-7422-049-4.
- Turčan, Valdimír (2003). "Prvá staroslovanská svätyňa na Slovensku" [The first Old Slavonic pagan shrine in Slovakia]. Historia - Revue O Dejnách Spoločnosti (in Slovak) (3). ISSN 1335-8316. Archived from the original on 2017-02-02.
- Ungerman, Šimon (2021). Frühmittelalterliche Ohrringe mit vier Blechbeeren in Nord-, Mittel- und Südosteuropa. Eine Fallstudie zur Entstehung des großmährischen Prachtschmucks [Early medieval earrings with four tin berries in northern, central and south-eastern Europe. A case study on the origins of Great Moravian jewellery] (in German). Brno: Archeologický ústav AV ČR. ISBN 978-80-7524-048-4.
- Urbańczyk, Przemysław (2005). "Early State Formation in East Central Europe". In Curta, Florin (ed.). East Central & Eastern Europe in the Early Middle Ages. The University of Michigan Press. pp. 139–151. ISBN 978-0-472-11498-6.
- Vlasto, Alexis P. (1970). The Entry of the Slavs into Christendom: An Introduction to the Medieval History of the Slavs. Cambridge: Cambridge University Press. ISBN 9780521074599.
- Wieczorek, Alfried and Hans-Martin Hinz (Hrsg.) (2000). Europas Mitte um 1000, Stuttgart. ISBN 3-8062-1545-6 or ISBN 3-8062-1544-8
- Wolfram, Herwig (1995). "Historické pramene a poloha (Veľkej) Moravy" [Historical sources and the location of Great Moravia]. Historický časopis (in Slovak). 43 (1). ISSN 0018-2575.
- Zábojník, Jozef (2009). Slovensko a avarský kaganát [Slovakia and the Avar Khaganate] (in Slovak). Bratislava: Filozofická fakulta Univerzity Komenského. ISBN 978-80-89236-62-6.
