= Christianity in the Middle Ages =

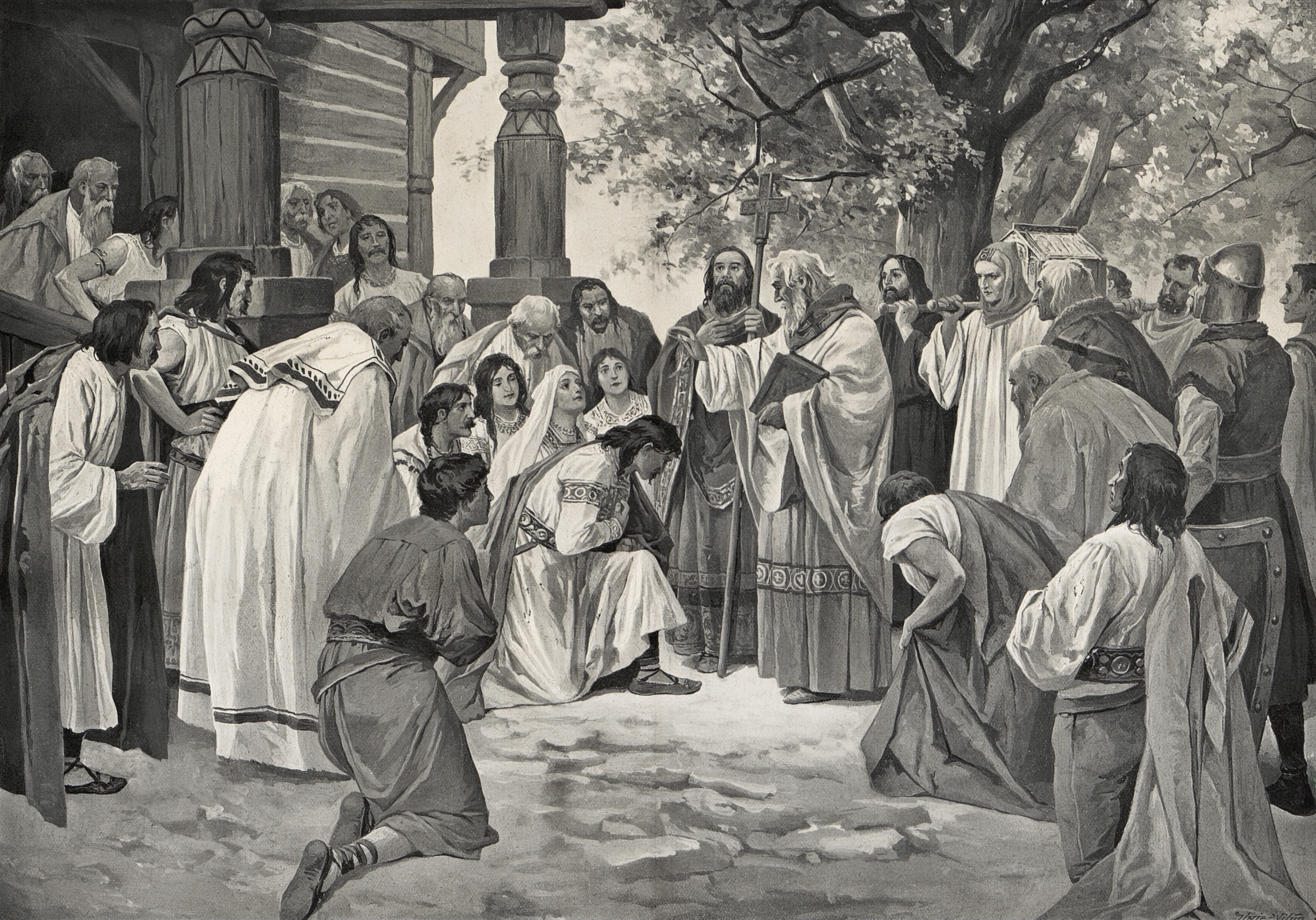
Brothers Cyril and Methodius bring Christianity to the Slavic peoples.

Christianity in the Middle Ages covers the history of Christianity from the fall of the Western Roman Empire (c. 476). The end of the period is variously defined - depending on the context, events such as the conquest of Constantinople by the Ottoman Empire in 1453, Christopher Columbus's first voyage to the Americas in 1492, or the Protestant Reformation in 1517 are sometimes used.

In Christianity's ancient Pentarchy, five patriarchies held special eminence: the sees of Rome, Constantinople, Jerusalem, Antioch, and Alexandria. The prestige of most of these sees depended in part on their apostolic founders, or in the case of Byzantium/Constantinople, that it was the new seat of the continuing Eastern Roman, or Byzantine Empire. These bishops considered themselves the successors of those apostles. In addition, all five cities were early centres of Christianity, losing their importance after the Levant was conquered by the Sunni Caliphate.

== Early Middle Ages (476–799) ==
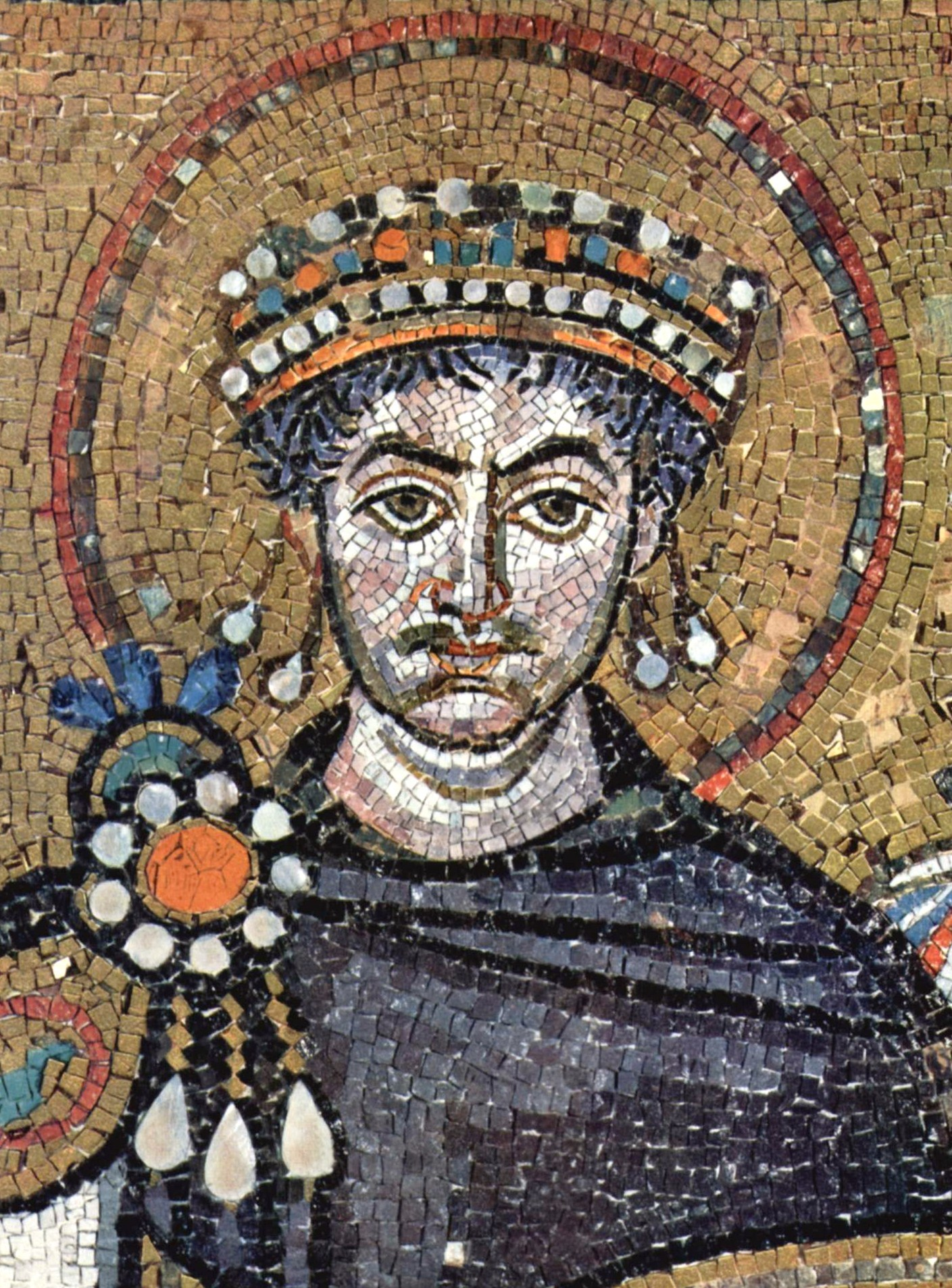
Mosaic of Justinian I in the church of San Vitale, Ravenna, Italy

The Early Middle Ages commenced when the last western Roman emperor was deposed in 476, to be followed by the barbarian king, Odoacer, to the coronation of Charlemagne as "Emperor of the Romans" by Pope Leo III in Rome on Christmas Day, 800. The year 476, however, is a rather artificial division. In the East, Roman imperial rule continued through the period historians now call the Byzantine Empire. Even in the West, where imperial political control gradually declined, distinctly Roman culture continued long afterwards; thus historians today prefer to speak of a "transformation of the Roman world" rather than a "fall of the Roman Empire."

The advent of the Early Middle Ages was a gradual and often localised process whereby, in the West, rural areas became power centres whilst urban areas declined. With the Muslim invasions of the seventh century, the Western (Latin) and Eastern (Greek) areas of Christianity began to take on distinctive shapes. Whereas in the East the Church maintained its strength, in the West the bishops of Rome (i.e., the Popes) were forced to adapt more quickly and flexibly to drastically changing circumstances. In particular whereas the bishops of the East maintained clear allegiance to the Eastern Roman Emperor, the bishop of Rome, while maintaining nominal allegiance to the Eastern Emperor, was forced to negotiate delicate balances with the "barbarian rulers" of the former Western provinces. Although the greater number of Christians remained in the East, the developments in the West would set the stage for major developments in the Christian world during the later centuries.

=== Early Medieval Papacy ===
After the Italian peninsula fell into warfare and turmoil due to the barbarian tribes, the Emperor Justinian I attempted to reassert imperial dominion in Italy from the East, against the Gothic aristocracy. The subsequent campaigns were more or less successful, and an Imperial Exarchate was established for Italy, but imperial influence was limited. The Lombards then invaded the weakened peninsula, and Rome was essentially left to fend for itself. The failure of the East to send aid resulted in the popes themselves feeding the city with grain from papal estates, negotiating treaties, paying protection money to Lombard warlords, and, failing that, hiring soldiers to defend the city. Eventually the popes turned to others for support, especially the Franks.

=== Spread beyond the Roman Empire ===
Christians and Pagans, a painting by Sergei Ivanov

As the political boundaries of the Roman Empire diminished and then collapsed in the West, Christianity spread beyond the old borders of the Empire and into Ireland, Anglo-Saxon England, and continental Germanic regions, many of which were never under Roman rule.

==== Irish missionaries ====
Beginning in the fifth century, a unique culture developed around the Irish Sea consisting of what today would be called Wales and Ireland. In this environment, Christianity spread from Roman Britain to Ireland, especially aided by the missionary activity of St. Patrick with his first-order of 'patrician clergy', active missionary priests accompanying or following him, typically Britons or Irish ordained by him and his successors. Patrick had been captured into slavery in Ireland and, following his escape and later consecration as bishop, he returned to the isle that had enslaved him so that he could bring them the Gospel. Soon, Irish missionaries such as Columba and Columbanus spread this Christianity, with its distinctively Irish features, to Scotland and the Continent. One such feature was the system of private penitence, which replaced the former practice of penance as a public rite.

==== Anglo-Saxons, English ====
Although southern Britain had been a Roman province, in 407 the imperial legions left the isle, and the Roman elite followed. Some time later that century, various barbarian tribes went from raiding and pillaging the island to settling and invading. These tribes are referred to as the "Anglo-Saxons", predecessors of the English. They were entirely pagan, having never been part of the Empire, and although they experienced Christian influence from the surrounding peoples, they were converted by the mission of St. Augustine sent by Pope Gregory the Great. The majority of the remaining British population converted from Christianity back to their Pagan roots. Contrary to popular belief, the conversion of Anglo-Saxons to Christianity was incredibly slow. The Anglo-Saxons had little interest in changing their religion and even initially looked down upon Christianity due to conquering the Christian British people decades earlier.

It took almost a century to convert only the aristocracy of the Anglo-Saxons to Christianity with many still converting back to Paganism. After this, the common folk took a few hundred more years to convert to Christianity and their reasoning for converting was in large part due to the nobility. Originally, Anglo-Saxon leaders claimed divine descent while taking part in many rituals and practices for Paganism but after their conversion they in turn became spiritual leaders for Christianity in Britain. Soon Anglo-Saxons started to incorporate their old Pagan stories and figures into Christianity, such as the Pagan god Woden becoming sixteenth in descent from 'Sceaf, Noah's son in the Bible. Later, under Archbishop Theodore, the Anglo-Saxons enjoyed a golden age of culture and scholarship. Soon, important English missionaries such as SS. Wilfrid, Willibrord, Lullus and Boniface would begin evangelising their Saxon relatives in Germany.

==== Franks ====
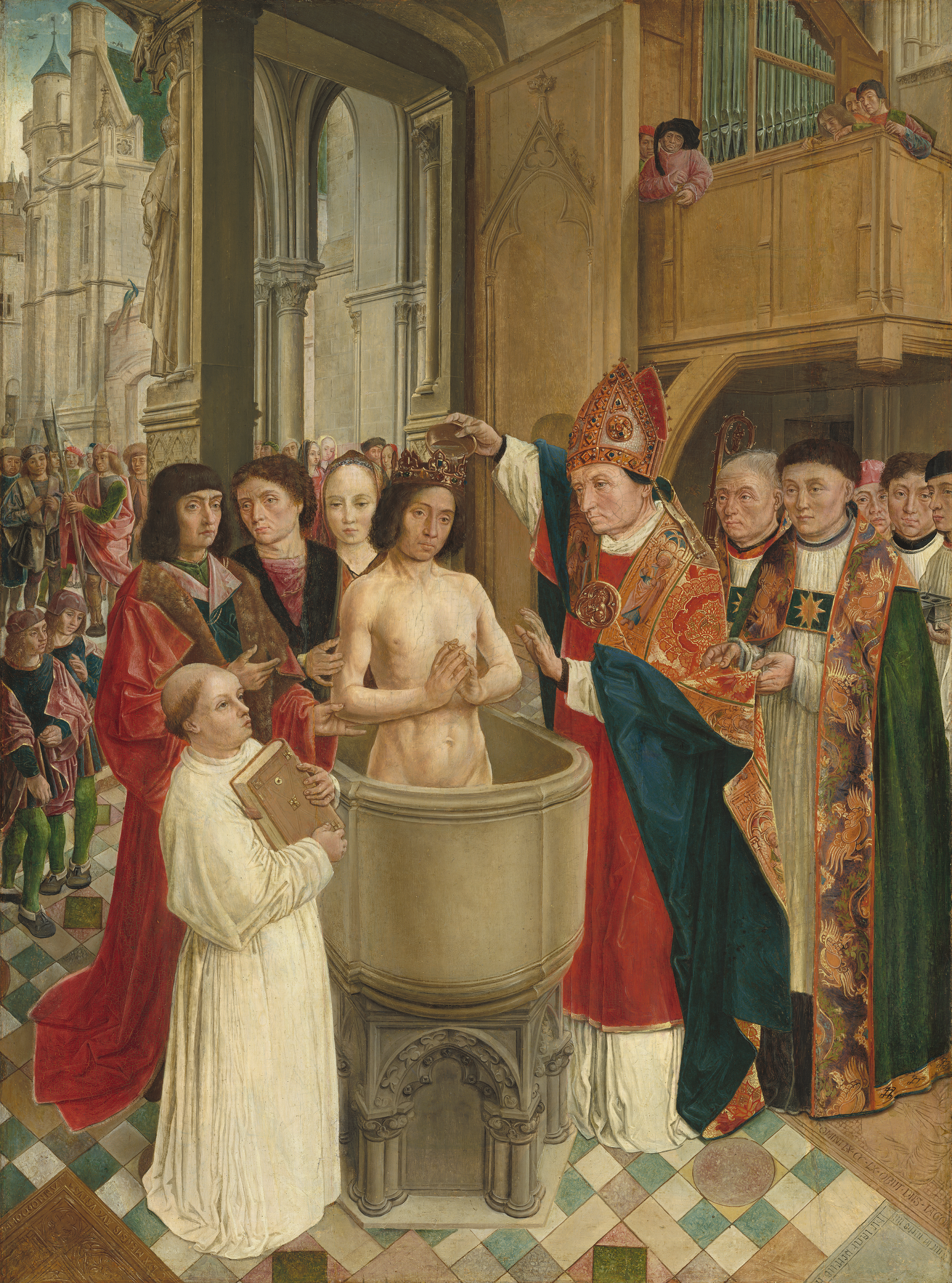
Saint Remigius baptises Clovis.

The largely Christian Gallo-Roman inhabitants of Gaul (modern France) were overrun by Germanic Franks in the early 5th century. The native inhabitants were persecuted until the Frankish King, Clovis I converted from paganism to Roman Catholicism in 496. Clovis insisted that his fellow nobles follow suit, strengthening his newly established kingdom by uniting the faith of the rulers with that of the ruled.

==== Frisians of the Low Countries ====
In 698, the Northumbrian Benedictine monk, Willibrord was commissioned by Pope Sergius I as bishop of the Frisians in what is now the Netherlands. Willibrord established a church in Utrecht.

Much of Willibrord's work was wiped out when the pagan Radbod, king of the Frisians destroyed many Christian centres between 716 and 719. In 717, the English missionary Boniface was sent to aid Willibrord, re-establishing churches in Frisia and continuing to preach throughout the pagan lands of Germany. Boniface was killed by pagans in 754.

=== Characteristics and movements ===
==== Iconoclasm ====
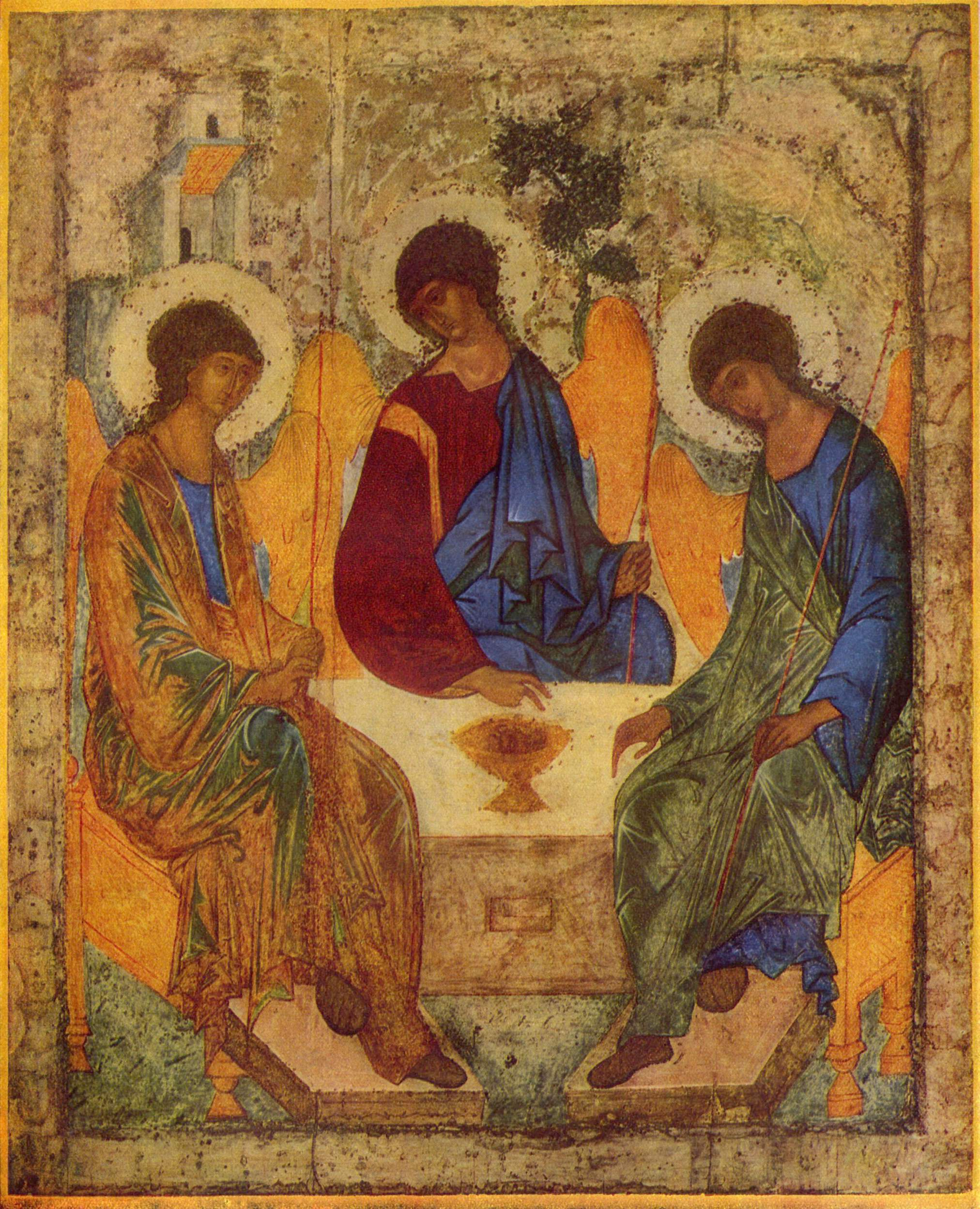
Andrei Rublev's Trinity

Iconoclasm as a movement began within the Eastern Christian Byzantine church in the early 8th century, following a series of heavy military reverses against the Muslims. There was a Christian movement in the eighth and ninth centuries against the worship of imagery, caused by worry that the art might be idolatrous. Sometime between 726 and 730 the Byzantine Emperor Leo III the Isaurian ordered the removal of an image of Jesus prominently placed over the Chalke gate, the ceremonial entrance to the Great Palace of Constantinople, and its replacement with a cross. This was followed by orders banning the pictorial representation of the family of Christ, subsequent Christian saints, and biblical scenes. In the West, Pope Gregory III held two synods at Rome and condemned Leo's actions. In Leo's realms, the Iconoclast Council at Hieria, 754 ruled that the culture of holy portraits (see icon) was not of a Christian origin and therefore heretical. The movement destroyed much of the Christian church's early artistic history, to the great loss of subsequent art and religious historians. The iconoclastic movement itself was later defined as heretical in 787 under the Seventh Ecumenical council, but enjoyed a brief resurgence between 815 and 842.

=== Apocalyptic thought ===
According to historian James T. Palmer, in the early Middle Ages, Christians had a strong emphasis on the immanent return of Christ, judgement, and the end of the world, stimulating the desire "to get it right" before the judgment:

"...apocalyptic thought in the early Middle Ages was commonplace and mainstream, and an important factor in the way that people conceptualised, stimulated and directed change. ... Apocalyptic thought, understood properly, essentially becomes a powerful part of reform discourse about how best to direct people – individually and collectively – towards a better life on Earth. Even when people saw divine punishment, maybe in attacks by Huns or raids by Vikings, they felt compelled to change behaviour, rather than to wallow in fatalistic self-pity."

— James T. Palmer, The Apocalypse in the early Middle Ages

== High Middle Ages (800–1300) ==
=== Carolingian Renaissance ===
The Carolingian Renaissance was a period of intellectual and cultural revival during the late 8th century and 9th century, mostly during the reigns of Charlemagne and Louis the Pious. There was an increase of literature, the arts, architecture, jurisprudence, liturgical and scriptural studies. The period also saw the development of Carolingian minuscule, the ancestor of modern lower-case script, and the standardisation of Latin which had hitherto become varied and irregular (see Medieval Latin). Reform was the creed of Charlemagne's Christianity. There was an emphasis on the differences of Christianity for the laity and Christianity for the nobility. At this time, religion and politics were deeply intertwined with one another. Charlemagne's belief in correcting the education system of the nobility was an example of this relationship between church and state. Illiteracy was a common problem among nobility as well. To address the problems of illiteracy among clergy and court scribes, Charlemagne founded schools and attracted the most learned men from all of Europe to his court, such as Theodulf, Paul the Deacon, Angilbert, Paulinus of Aquileia. It is also important to acknowledge that at this time, creating a manuscript would have been comparable to the modern expense of purchasing a laptop. Therefore only wealthy, influential individuals such as Charlemagne would have been capable of propelling this expansion of clerical education.

=== Growing tensions between East and West ===
The cracks and fissures in Christian unity which led to the East-West Schism started to become evident as early as the fourth century. Cultural, political, and linguistic differences were often mixed with the theological, leading to schism.

The transfer of the Roman capital to Constantinople inevitably brought mistrust, rivalry, and even jealousy to the relations of the two great sees, Rome and Constantinople. It was easy for Rome to be jealous of Constantinople at a time when it was rapidly losing its political prominence. Estrangement was also helped along by the German invasions in the West, which effectively weakened contacts. The rise of Islam with its conquest of most of the Mediterranean coastline (not to mention the arrival of the pagan Slavs in the Balkans at the same time) further intensified this separation by driving a physical wedge between the two worlds. The once homogenous unified world of the Mediterranean was fast vanishing. Communication between the Greek East and Latin West by the 600s had become dangerous and practically ceased.

Two basic problems – the nature of the primacy of the bishop of Rome and the theological implications of adding a clause to the Nicene Creed, known as the filioque clause – were involved. These doctrinal issues were first openly discussed in Photius's patriarchate.

Largely extinct Church of the East and its largest extent during the Middle Ages.

By the fifth century, Christendom was divided into a pentarchy of five sees with Rome accorded a primacy. The four Eastern sees of the pentarchy, considered this determined by canonical decision and did not entail hegemony of any one local church or patriarchate over the others. However, Rome began to interpret her primacy in terms of sovereignty, as a God-given right involving universal jurisdiction in the Church. The collegial and conciliar nature of the Church, in effect, was gradually abandoned in favour of supremacy of unlimited papal power over the entire Church.

These ideas were finally given systematic expression in the West during the Gregorian Reform movement of the eleventh century. The Eastern churches viewed Rome's understanding of the nature of episcopal power as being in direct opposition to the Church's essentially conciliar structure and thus saw the two ecclesiologies as mutually antithetical. For them, specifically, Simon Peter's primacy could never be the exclusive prerogative of any one bishop. All bishops must, like St. Peter, confess Jesus as the Christ and, as such, all are Peter's successors. The churches of the East gave the Roman See, primacy but not supremacy. The Pope being the first among equals, but not infallible and not with absolute authority.

The other major irritant to Eastern Christendom was the Western use of the filioque clause—meaning "and the Son"—in the Nicene Creed . This too developed gradually and entered the Creed over time. The issue was the addition by the West of the Latin clause filioque to the Creed, as in "the Holy Spirit... who proceeds from the Father and the Son," where the original Creed, sanctioned by the councils and still used today, by the Eastern Orthodox simply states "the Holy Spirit, the Lord and Giver of Life, who proceeds from the Father." The Eastern Church argued that the phrase had been added unilaterally and, therefore, illegitimately, since the East had never been consulted. In the final analysis, only another ecumenical council could introduce such an alteration. Indeed, the councils, which drew up the original Creed, had expressly forbidden any subtraction or addition to the text. In addition to this ecclesiological issue, the Eastern Church also considered the filioque clause unacceptable on dogmatic grounds. Theologically, the Latin interpolation was unacceptable since it implied that the Spirit now had two sources of origin and procession, the Father and the Son, rather than the Father alone.

=== Photian Schism ===
In the 9th century AD, a controversy arose between Eastern (Byzantine, later Orthodox) and Western (Latin, later Roman Catholic) Christianity that was precipitated by the opposition of the Roman Pope John VIII to the appointment by the Byzantine emperor Michael III of Photius I to the position of patriarch of Constantinople. Photios was refused an apology by the pope for previous points of dispute between the East and West. Photius refused to accept the supremacy of the pope in Eastern matters or accept the filioque clause. The Latin delegation at the council of his consecration pressed him to accept the clause in order to secure their support.

The controversy also involved Eastern and Western ecclesiastical jurisdictional rights in the Bulgarian church, as well as a doctrinal dispute over the Filioque ("and from the Son") clause. That had been added to the Nicene Creed by the Latin church, which was later the theological breaking point in the ultimate Great East-West Schism in the eleventh century.

Photius did provide concession on the issue of jurisdictional rights concerning Bulgaria and the papal legates made do with his return of Bulgaria to Rome. This concession, however, was purely nominal, as Bulgaria's return to the Byzantine rite in 870 had already secured for it an autocephalous church. Without the consent of Boris I of Bulgaria, the papacy was unable to enforce any of its claims.

=== East-West Schism ===
The East-West Schism, or Great Schism, separated the Church into Western (Latin) and Eastern (Greek) branches, i.e., Western Catholicism and Eastern Orthodoxy. It was the first major division since certain groups in the East rejected the decrees of the Council of Chalcedon (see Oriental Orthodoxy), and was far more significant. Though normally dated to 1054, the East-West Schism was actually the result of an extended period of estrangement between Latin and Greek Christendom over the nature of papal primacy and certain doctrinal matters like the filioque, but intensified by cultural and linguistic differences.

The "official" schism in 1054 was the excommunication of Patriarch Michael Cerularius of Constantinople, followed by his excommunication of papal legates. Attempts at reconciliation were made in 1274 (by the Second Council of Lyon) and in 1439 (by the Council of Basel), but in each case the eastern hierarchs who consented to the unions were repudiated by the Orthodox as a whole, though reconciliation was achieved between the West and what are now called the "Eastern Rite Catholic Churches." More recently, in 1965 the mutual excommunications were rescinded by the Pope and the Patriarch of Constantinople, though schism remains.

Both groups are descended from the Early Church, both acknowledge the apostolic succession of each other's bishops, and the validity of each other's sacraments. Though both acknowledge the primacy of the Bishop of Rome, Eastern Orthodoxy understands this as a primacy of honour with limited or no ecclesiastical authority in other dioceses.

The Orthodox East perceived the Papacy as taking on monarchical characteristics that were not in line with the church's traditional relationship with the emperor.

The final breach is often considered to have arisen after the capture and sacking of Constantinople by the Fourth Crusade in 1204. Crusades against Christians in the East by Roman Catholic crusaders was not exclusive to the Mediterranean though (see also the Northern Crusades and the Battle of the Ice). The sacking of Constantinople, especially the Church of Holy Wisdom and the Church of the Holy Apostles, and establishment of the Latin Empire as a seeming attempt to supplant the Orthodox Byzantine Empire in 1204 is viewed with some rancour to the present day. Many in the East saw the actions of the West as a prime determining factor in the weakening of Byzantium. This led to the Empire's eventual conquest and fall to Islam. In 2004, Pope John Paul II extended a formal apology for the sacking of Constantinople in 1204; the apology was formally accepted by Patriarch Bartholomew of Constantinople. Many things that were stolen during this time: holy relics, riches, and many other items, are still held in various Western European cities, particularly Venice.

=== Monastic Reform ===
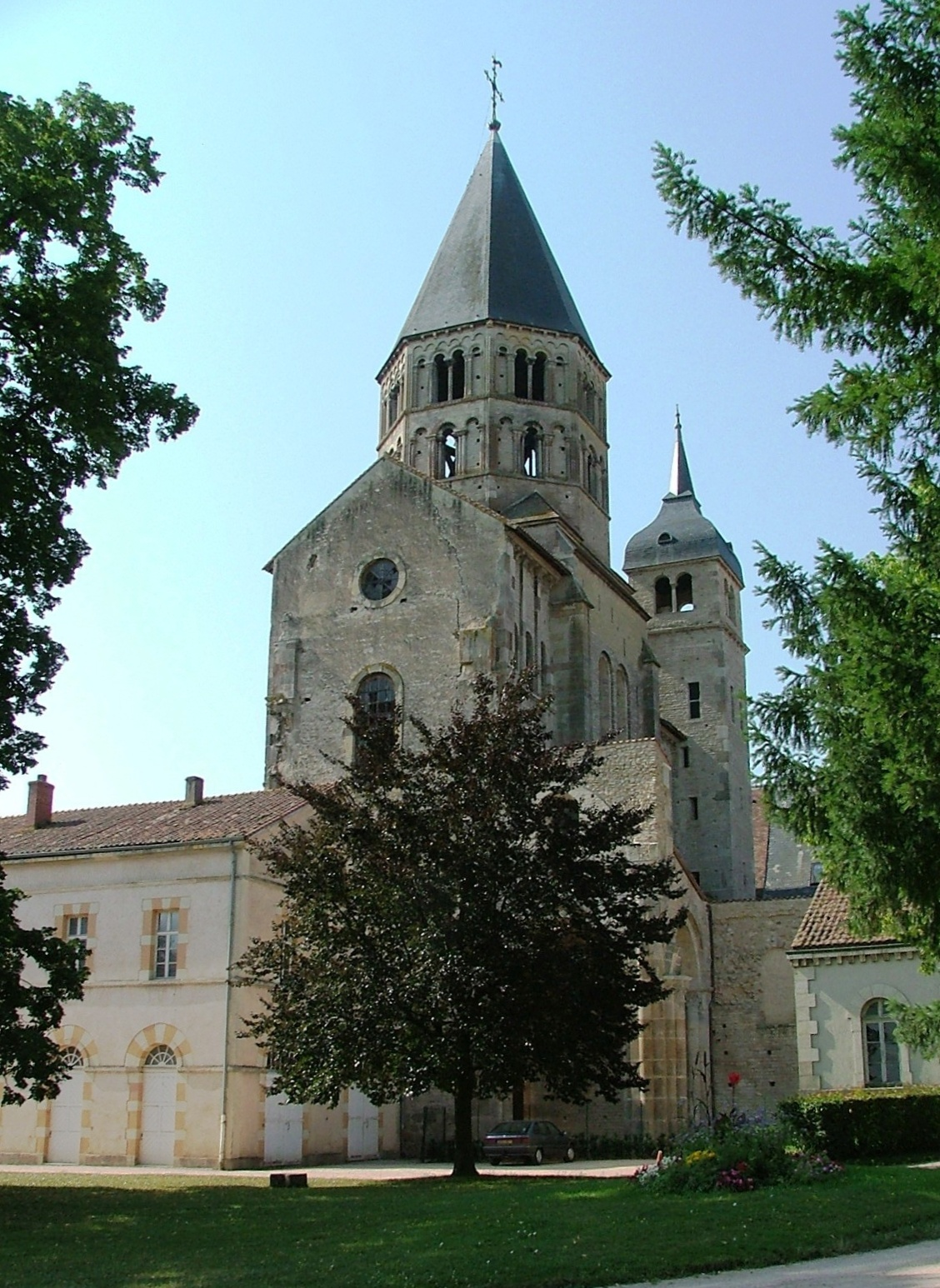
A view of the Abbey of Cluny.

==== Cluny ====
From the 6th century onward most of the monasteries in the West were of the Benedictine Order. Owing to the stricter adherence to a reformed Benedictine rule, the abbey of Cluny became the acknowledged leader of western monasticism from the later 10th century. Cluny created a large, federated order in which the administrators of subsidiary houses served as deputies of the abbot of Cluny and answered to him. The Cluniac spirit was a revitalising influence on the Norman church, at its height from the second half of the 10th centuries through the early 12th.

==== Cîteaux ====
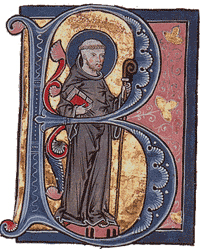
Bernard of Clairvaux, in a medieval illuminated manuscript.

The next wave of monastic reform came with the Cistercian Movement. The first Cistercian abbey was founded in 1098, at Cîteaux Abbey. The keynote of Cistercian life was a return to a literal observance of the Benedictine rule, rejecting the developments of the Benedictines. The most striking feature in the reform was the return to manual labour, and especially to field-work. Inspired by Bernard of Clairvaux, the primary builder of the Cistercians, they became the main force of technological diffusion in medieval Europe. By the end of the 12th century the Cistercian houses numbered 500, and at its height in the 15th century the order claimed to have close to 750 houses. Most of these were built in wilderness areas, and played a major part in bringing such isolated parts of Europe into economic cultivation.

==== Mendicant Orders ====
A third level of monastic reform was provided by the establishment of the Mendicant orders. Commonly known as friars, mendicants live under a monastic rule with traditional vows of poverty, chastity and obedience, but they emphasise preaching, missionary activity, and education, in a secluded monastery. Beginning in the 12th century, the Franciscan order was instituted by the followers of Francis of Assisi, and thereafter the Dominican Order was begun by St. Dominic.

=== Investiture Controversy ===
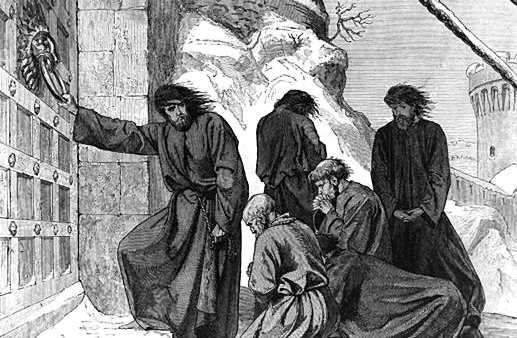
Henry IV at the gate of Canossa, by August von Heyden

The Investiture Controversy, or Lay investiture controversy, was the most significant conflict between secular and religious powers in medieval Europe. It began as a dispute in the 11th century between the Holy Roman Emperor Henry IV, and Pope Gregory VII concerning who would appoint bishops (investiture). The end of lay investiture threatened to undercut the power of the Empire and the ambitions of noblemen for the benefit of Church reform.

Bishops collected revenues from estates attached to their bishopric. Noblemen who held lands (fiefdoms) hereditarily passed those lands on within their family. However, because bishops had no legitimate children, when a bishop died it was the king's right to appoint a successor. So, while a king had little recourse in preventing noblemen from acquiring powerful domains via inheritance and dynastic marriages, a king could keep careful control of lands under the domain of his bishops. Kings would bestow bishoprics to members of noble families whose friendship he wished to secure. Furthermore, if a king left a bishopric vacant, then he collected the estates' revenues until a bishop was appointed, when in theory he was to repay the earnings. The infrequence of this repayment was an obvious source of dispute. The Church wanted to end this lay investiture because of the potential corruption, not only from vacant sees but also from other practices such as simony. Thus, the Investiture Contest was part of the Church's attempt to reform the episcopate and provide better pastoral care.

Pope Gregory VII issued the Dictatus Papae, which declared that the pope alone could appoint or depose bishops, or translate them to other sees. Henry IV's rejection of the decree lead to his excommunication and a ducal revolt; eventually Henry received absolution after dramatic public penance barefoot in Alpine snow and cloaked in a hairshirt (see Walk to Canossa), though the revolt and conflict of investiture continued. Likewise, a similar controversy occurred in England between King Henry I and St. Anselm, Archbishop of Canterbury, over investiture and ecclesiastical revenues collected by the king during an episcopal vacancy. The English dispute was resolved by the Concordat of London, 1107, where the king renounced his claim to invest bishops but continued to require an oath of fealty from them upon their election. This was a partial model for the Concordat of Worms (Pactum Calixtinum), which resolved the Imperial investiture controversy with a compromise that allowed secular authorities some measure of control but granted the selection of bishops to their cathedral canons. As a symbol of the compromise, lay authorities invested bishops with their secular authority symbolised by the lance, and ecclesiastical authorities invested bishops with their spiritual authority symbolised by the ring and the staff.

=== Crusades ===
The Crusades were a series of military conflicts conducted by Christian knights for the defense of Christians and for the expansion of Christian domains. Generally, the Crusades refer to the campaigns in the Holy Land sponsored by the papacy against invading Muslim forces. There were other crusades against Islamic forces in southern Spain, southern Italy, and Sicily, as well as the campaigns of Teutonic knights against pagan strongholds in Eastern Europe (see Northern Crusades). A few crusades such as the Fourth Crusade were waged within Christendom against groups that were considered heretical and schismatic (also see the Battle of the Ice and the Albigensian Crusade).

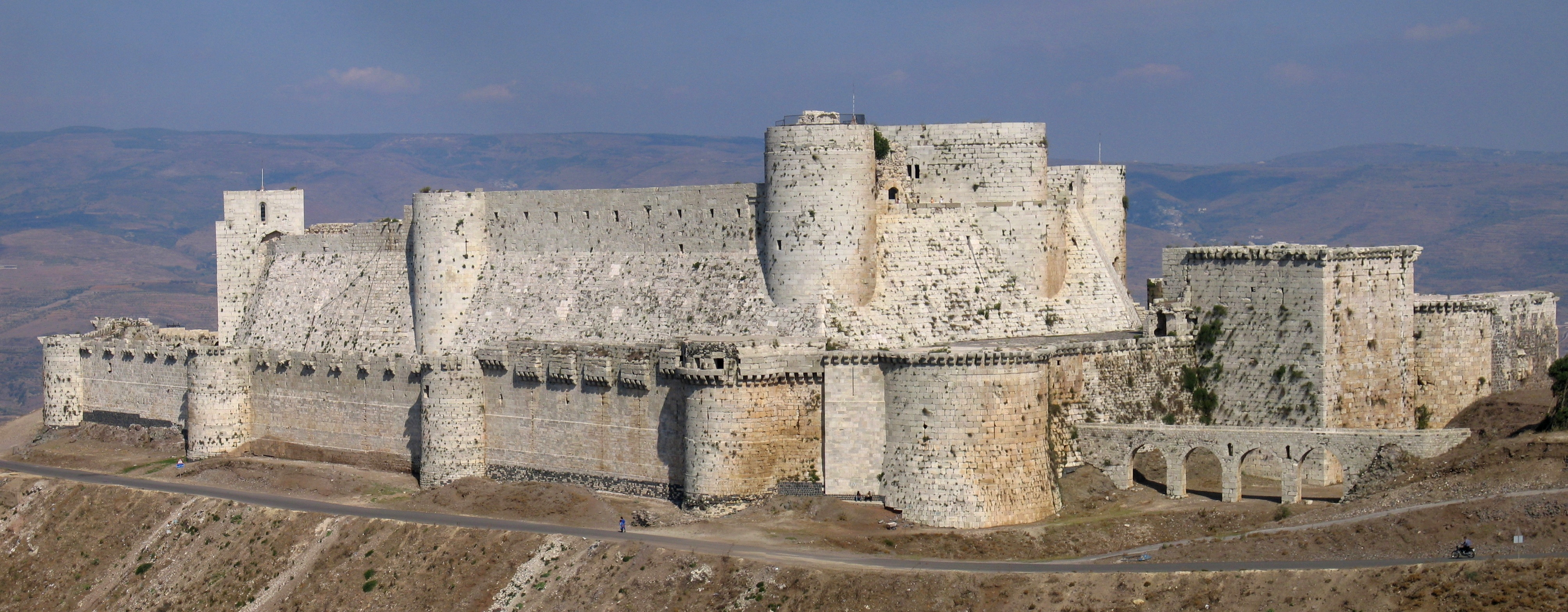
Krak des Chevaliers was built in the County of Tripoli by the Knights Hospitaller during the Crusades.

The Holy Land had been part of the Roman Empire, and thus Byzantine Empire, until the Islamic conquests of the seventh and eighth centuries. Thereafter, Christians had generally been permitted to visit the sacred places in the Holy Land until 1071, when the Seljuk Turks closed Christian pilgrimages and assailed the Byzantines, defeating them at the Battle of Manzikert. Emperor Alexius I asked for aid from Pope Urban II (1088–1099) for help against Islamic aggression. Urban II called upon the knights of Christendom in a speech made at the Council of Clermont on 27 November 1095, combining the idea of pilgrimage to the Holy Land with that of waging a holy war against the invading forces.

In the First Crusade, after nine months of war of attrition, a traitor named Firuz led the Franks into the city of Antioch in 1098. However, after less than a week, the might of an army numbering hundreds of thousands led by Kerbogah arrived and besieged the city. The crusaders reportedly had only 30,000 men and the Turks outnumbered them three to one; facing desertion and starvation, Bohemond was officially chosen to lead the crusader army in June 1098. On the morning of 28 June, the crusader army, consisting of mostly dismounted knights and foot soldiers because most horses had died at that point, sallied out to attack the Turks, and broke the line of Kerbogah's army, allowing the crusaders to gain complete control of the Antioch and its surroundings. The Second Crusade was launched in 1147 in response to the fall of Edessa to Islamic forces in December 1144. Jerusalem would be held until 1187 and the Third Crusade, famous for the battles between Richard the Lionheart and Saladin. The Fourth Crusade, begun by Innocent III in 1202, intended to retake the Holy Land but was soon subverted by Venetians who used the forces to sack the Christian city of Zara. Innocent excommunicated the Venetians and crusaders. Eventually the crusaders arrived in Constantinople, but due to strife which arose between them and the Byzantines, the crusaders sacked Constantinople and other parts of Asia Minor, rather than proceeding to the Holy Land, effectively establishing the Latin Empire of Constantinople in Greece and Asia Minor. This was effectively the last crusade sponsored by the papacy; later crusades were sponsored by individuals. Thus, though Jerusalem was held for nearly a century and other strongholds in the Near East would remain in Christian possession much longer, the crusades in the Holy Land ultimately failed to establish permanent Christian kingdoms. The Europeans' defeat can in no small part be attributed to the excellent martial prowess of the Mameluke and Turks, who both utilized agile mounted archers in open battle and Greek fire in siege defense. However, ultimately it was the inability of the Crusader leaders to command coherently that doomed the military campaign. In addition, the failure of the missionaries to convert the Mongols to Christianity thwarted the hope for a Tartar- Frank alliance. The Mongols later on converted to Islam. Islamic expansion into Europe would renew and remain a threat for centuries, culminating in the campaigns of Suleiman the Magnificent in the sixteenth century. On the other hand, the crusades in southern Spain, southern Italy, and Sicily eventually led to the demise of Islamic power in the regions; the Teutonic knights expanded Christian domains in Eastern Europe, and the much less frequent crusades within Christendom, such as the Albigensian Crusade, achieved their goal of maintaining doctrinal unity.

=== Medieval inquisition ===
The Medieval Inquisition officially started in 1231, when Pope Gregory IX appointed the first inquisitors to serve as papal agents to remove heresy. Heretics were seen as a menace to the Church and the first group dealt with by the inquisitors were the Cathars of southern France. Heresy had been seen as a recurring problem for the medieval Church since the burning of heretics at Orlèans in 1022. The main tool used by the inquisitors was interrogation that often featured the use of torture followed by having heretics burned at the stake. After about a century this first medieval inquisition came to a conclusion. A new inquisition called the Spanish Inquisition was created by King Ferdinand and Queen Isabella in order to consolidate their rule. This new inquisition was separated from the Roman Church and the inquisition that came before it. At first it was primarily directed at Jews who converted to Christianity because many were suspicious that they did not actually convert to Christianity. Later it spread to targeting Muslims and the various peoples of the Americas and Asia. The inquisitions in combination with the Albigensian Crusade were fairly successful in suppressing heresy.

=== Rise of universities ===
Modern western universities have their origins directly in the Medieval Church. They began as cathedral schools, and all students were considered clerics. This was a benefit as it placed the students under ecclesiastical jurisdiction and thus imparted certain legal immunities and protections. The cathedral schools eventually became partially detached from the cathedrals and formed their own institutions, the earliest being the University of Paris (c. 1150), the University of Bologna (1088), and the University of Oxford (1096).

=== Spread of Christianity ===
==== Conversion of the Slavs ====
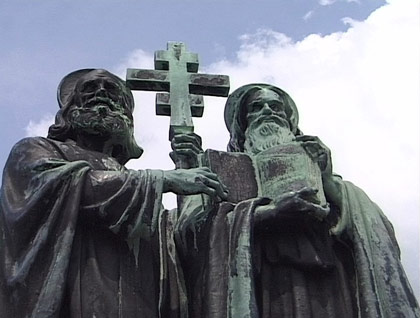
St. Cyril and St. Methodius Monument on Mt. Radhošť

Though by 800 western Europe was ruled entirely by Christian kings, central and eastern Europe remained areas of missionary activity. In the ninth century SS. Cyril and Methodius had extensive missionary activities among the Slavic peoples, translating the Bible and liturgy into Slavonic.

In the ninth and tenth centuries Christianity made great inroads into central and eastern Europe. The evangelisation, or Christianisation, of the Slavs was strongly supported by one of Byzantium's most learned churchmen of the Eastern Roman Empire (also called Byzantine Empire) Patriarch Photius. The Byzantine emperor Michael III chose Cyril and Methodius in response to a request from Rastislav, the king of Moravia who wanted missionaries that could minister to the Moravians in their own language.

The two brothers spoke the Slavonic vernacular local for the region of Thessaloniki, still very close to the original Proto-Slavic, and translated the Bible and many of the prayer books. As in the later centuries the translations prepared by them were copied by speakers of other early Slavic dialects, different local variants evolved as recensions of the later Church Slavonic literary and liturgical language.

Some of the disciples, namely Naum of Preslav, Clement of Ohrid, Saint Angelar, and Sava, returned to Bulgaria where they were welcomed by the Bulgarian Tsar Boris I who viewed the Slavonic liturgy as a way to counteract Greek influence in the country. In a short time the disciples of Cyril and Methodius managed to prepare and instruct the future Slavic clergy into the Glagolitic alphabet and the biblical texts, where also the Early Cyrillic alphabet was developed in the late 9th century. Bulgaria was officially christianised in 864 and was recognised as a patriarchate by Constantinople in 927, the first one after the five original Patriarchates forming the Pentarchy from the late Roman Empire.

The Serbs were accounted Christian as of about 870. Serbian patriarchate was recognised by Constantinople in 1346.

The Baptism of Kiev in the 988 spread Christianity throughout Kievan Rus', establishing Christianity in the predecessor state of Belarus, Russia and Ukraine. The much later Russian patriarchate was recognised by Constantinople in 1589.

The missionaries to the Slavs had subsequent success in part because they used the people's native language rather than Latin as the Roman priests did, or Greek.

===== Mission to Great Moravia =====
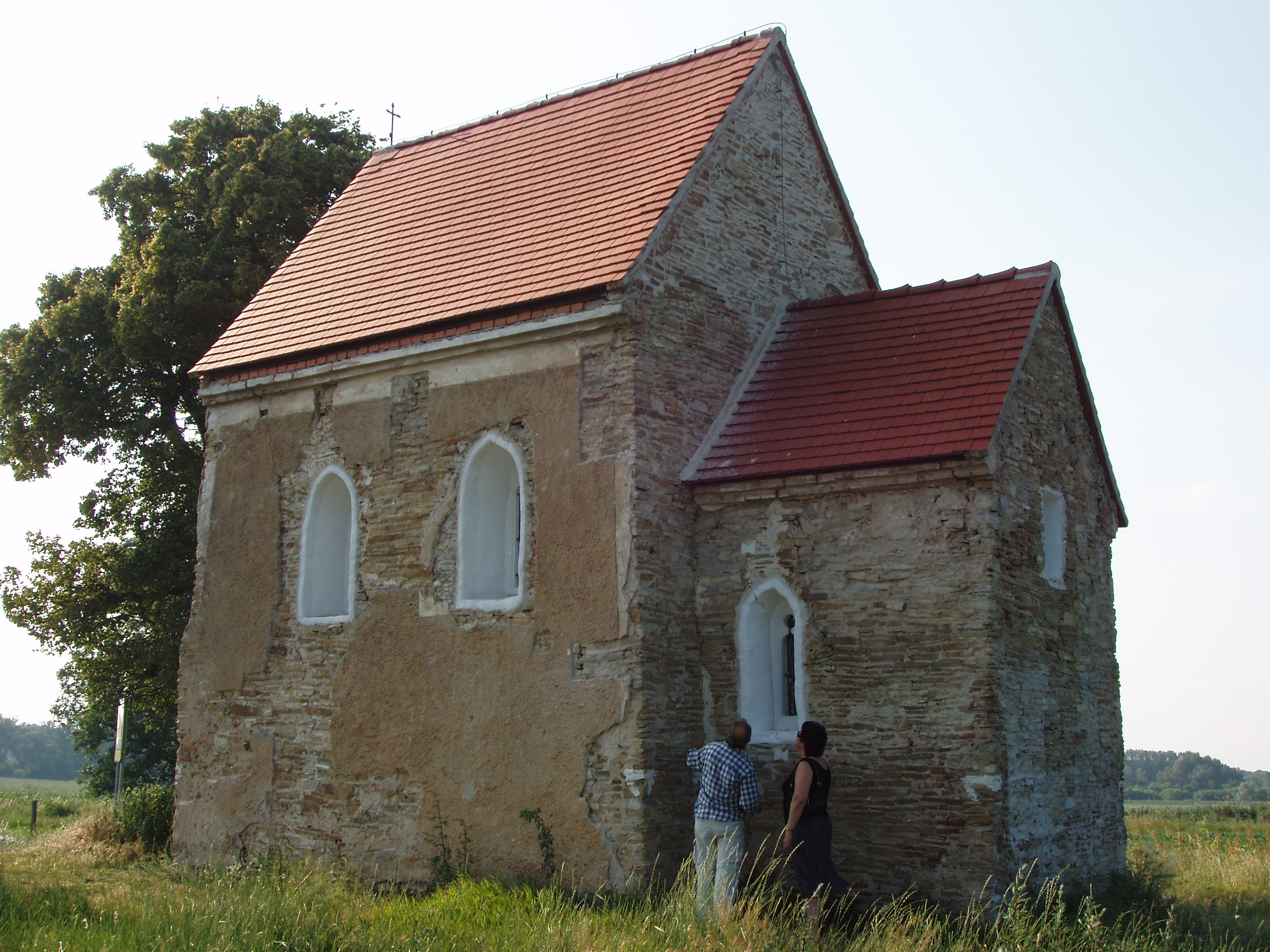
Church of St. Margaret of Antioch, Kopčany (Kopčany, Slovakia, 9th-10th century) - the only preserved building from the time of Great Moravia.

When king Rastislav of Moravia asked Byzantium for teachers who could minister to the Moravians in their own language, Byzantine emperor Michael III chose two brothers, Cyril and Methodius. As their mother was a Slav from the hinterlands of Thessaloniki, the two brothers had been raised speaking the local Slavonic vernacular. Once commissioned, they immediately set about creating an alphabet, the Cyrillic script; they then translated the Scripture and the liturgy into Slavonic. This Slavic dialect became the basis of Old Church Slavonic which later evolved into Church Slavonic which is the common liturgical language still used by the Russian Orthodox Church and other Slavic Orthodox Christians. The missionaries to the East and South Slavs had great success in part because they used the people's native language rather than Latin or Greek. In Great Moravia, Constantine and Methodius encountered Frankish missionaries from Germany, representing the western or Latin branch of the Church, and more particularly representing the Holy Roman Empire as founded by Charlemagne, and committed to linguistic, and cultural uniformity. They insisted on the use of the Latin liturgy, and they regarded Moravia and the Slavic peoples as part of their rightful mission field.

When friction developed, the brothers, unwilling to be a cause of dissension among Christians, travelled to Rome to see the Pope, seeking an agreement that would avoid quarrelling between missionaries in the field. Constantine entered a monastery in Rome, taking the name Cyril, by which he is now remembered. However, he died only a few weeks thereafter.

Pope Adrian II gave Methodius the title of Archbishop of Sirmium (now Sremska Mitrovica in Serbia) and sent him back in 869, with jurisdiction over all of Moravia and Pannonia, and authorisation to use the Slavonic Liturgy. Soon, however, Prince Ratislav, who had originally invited the brothers to Moravia, died, and his successor did not support Methodius. In 870 the Frankish king Louis and his bishops deposed Methodius at a synod at Ratisbon, and imprisoned him for a little over two years. Pope John VIII secured his release, but instructed him to stop using the Slavonic Liturgy.

In 878, Methodius was summoned to Rome on charges of heresy and using Slavonic. This time Pope John was convinced by the arguments that Methodius made in his defence and sent him back cleared of all charges, and with permission to use Slavonic. The Carolingian bishop who succeeded him, Witching, suppressed the Slavonic Liturgy and forced the followers of Methodius into exile. Many found refuge with Boris of Bulgaria (852–889), under whom they reorganised a Slavic-speaking Church, instead of Greek. Meanwhile, Pope John's successors adopted a Latin-only policy which lasted for centuries.

===== Conversion of Bulgaria =====
Some of the disciples, namely St. Kliment, St. Naum who were of noble Bulgarian descent and St. Angelaruis, returned to Bulgaria where they were welcomed by the energetic Bulgarian ruler Boris I who viewed the Slavonic liturgy as a way to counteract Greek influence in the country. Prior to Christianity, the majority of Bulgaria was pagan. In 864 Boris I adopted Christianity from Constantinople, making it the official religion of Bulgaria. Shortly after he gladly accepted the Christian missionaries into the country. In a short time the disciples of Cyril and Methodius managed to prepare and instruct the future Bulgarian clergy into the Glagolitic alphabet and the biblical texts and in AD 893, Bulgaria expelled its Greek clergy and proclaimed the Old Bulgarian (also called Old Church Slavonic) as the official language of the church and the state. This act had long lasting consequences for the culture of Bulgaria and many other Slavic speaking people, as it produced the Golden Age of Bulgaria and the development and spread of the Early Cyrillic alphabet and Medieval Bulgarian literature.

Bulgarian church was almost always aligned with the Orthodox Christianity after the split of the Eastern and Western churches in 1050, with occasional and temporary decades long union with the Roman church during the reign of Kaloyan in the beginning of the 13th century.

===== Conversion of the Rus' =====
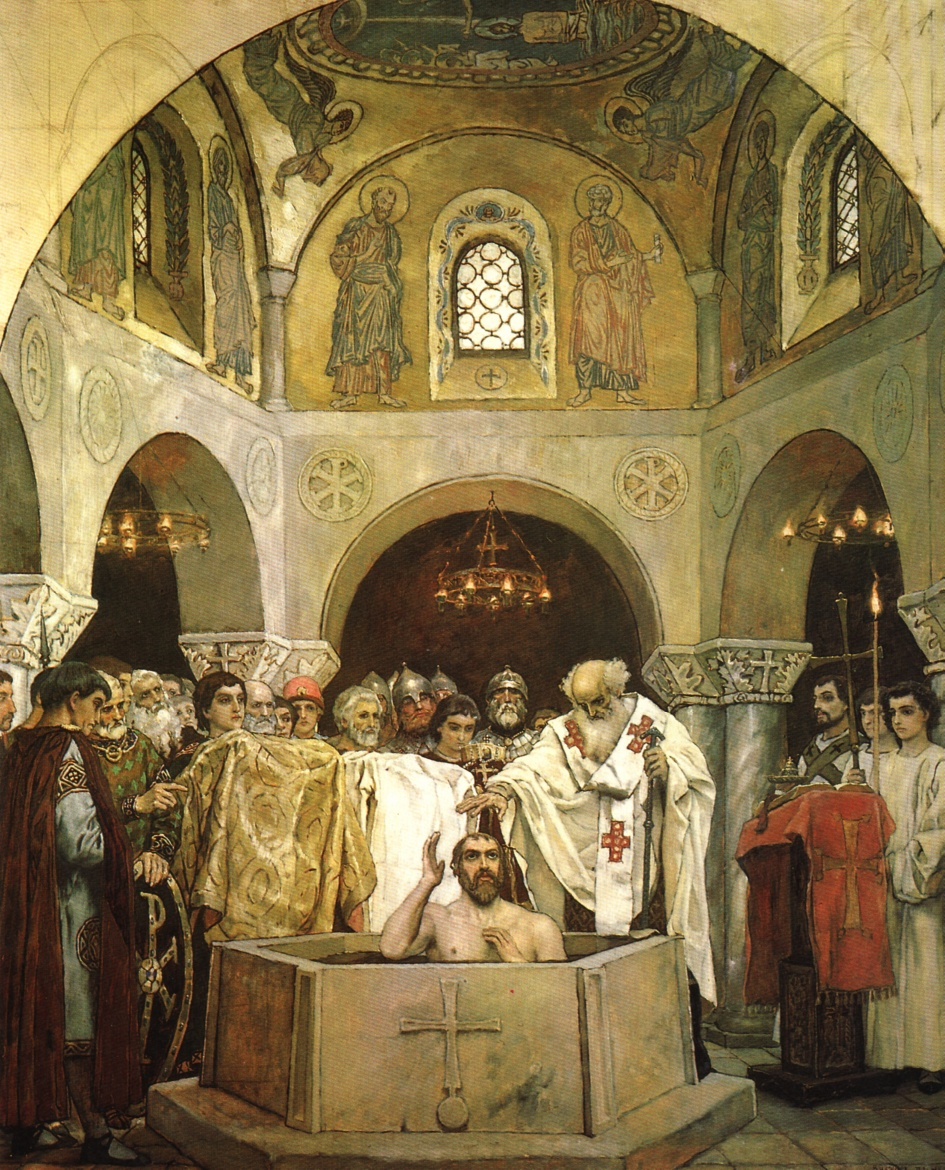
Baptism of Vladimir

The success of the conversion of the Bulgarians facilitated the conversion of other Slavic peoples, most notably the East Slavic Kievan Rus, predecessor state of Belarus, Russia, and Ukrainia, as well as of the Rusyns. By the beginning of the eleventh century most of the pagan Slavic world, including Bulgaria, Serbia and Russia, had been converted to Byzantine Christianity.

The traditional event associated with the conversion of Russia is the baptism of Vladimir of Kiev in 988, on which occasion he was also married to the Byzantine princess Anna, the sister of the Byzantine Emperor Basil II. However, Christianity is documented to have predated this event in the city of Kiev and in Georgia.

Today the Russian Orthodox Church is the largest of the Orthodox Churches.

==== Conversion of the Scandinavians ====
Early evangelisation in Scandinavia was begun by Ansgar, Archbishop of Bremen, "Apostle of the North". Ansgar, a native of Amiens, was sent with a group of monks to Jutland Denmark in around 820 at the time of the pro-Christian Jutish king Harald Klak. The mission was only partially successful, and Ansgar returned two years later to Germany, after Harald had been driven out of his kingdom. In 829 Ansgar went to Birka on Lake Mälaren, Sweden, with his aide friar Witmar, and a small congregation was formed in 831 which included the king's own steward Hergeir. Conversion was slow, however, and most Scandinavian lands were only completely Christianised at the time of rulers such as Saint Canute IV of Denmark and Olaf I of Norway in the years following AD 1000.

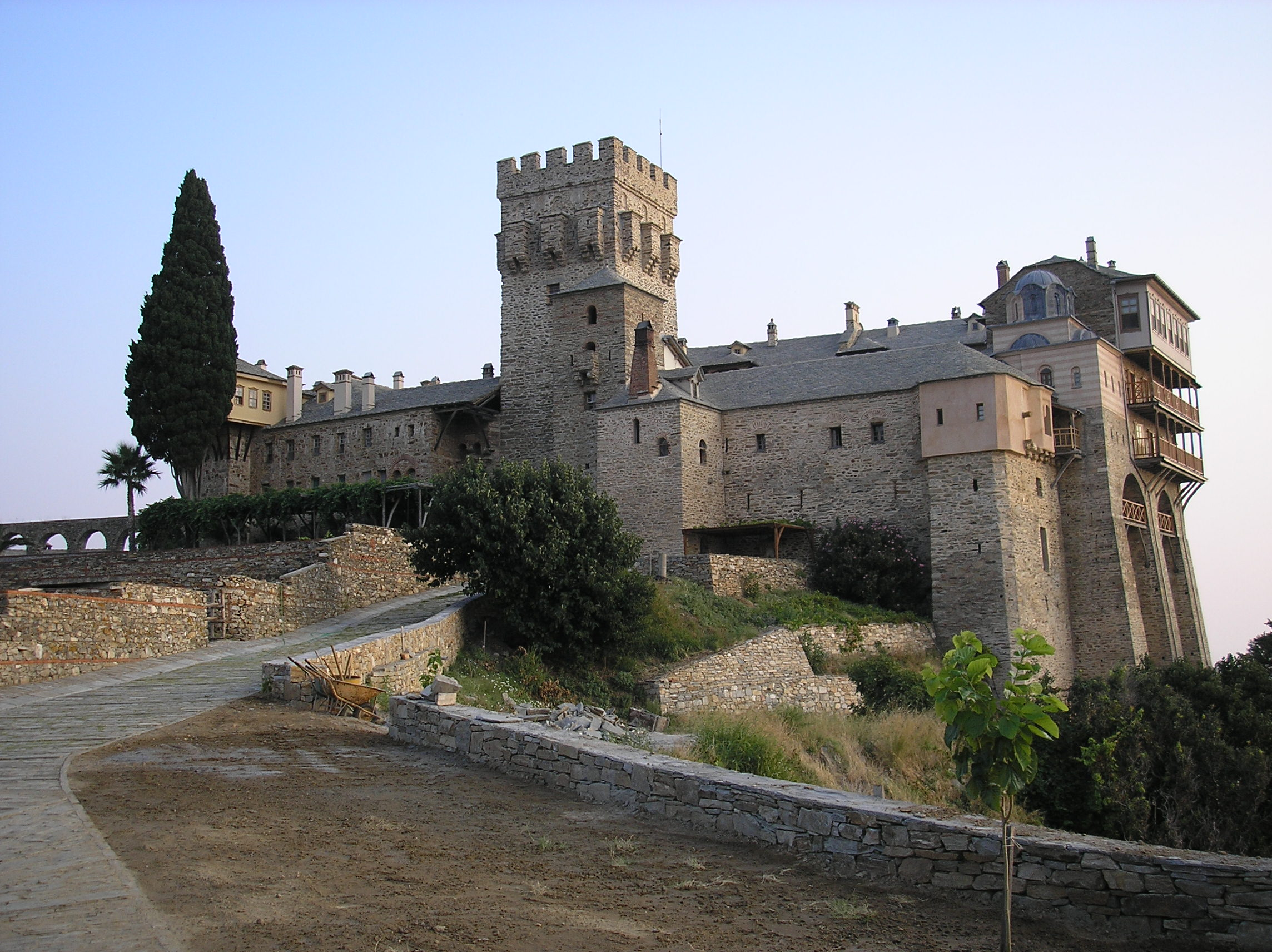
Stavronikita monastery, South-East view

== Late Middle Ages (1300–1499) ==
=== Hesychast Controversy ===
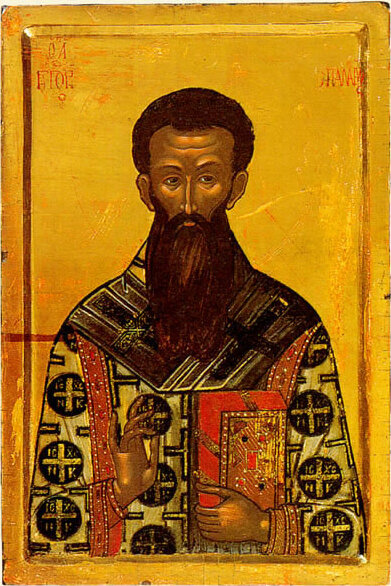
Gregory Palamas

Barlaam of Calabria

About the year 1337 Hesychasm attracted the attention of a learned member of the Orthodox Church, Barlaam of Calabria who at that time held the office of abbot in the Monastery of St Saviour's in Constantinople and who visited Mount Athos. Mount Athos was then at the height of its fame and influence under the reign of Andronicus III Palaeologus and under the 'first-ship' of the Protos Symeon. On Mount Athos, Barlaam encountered Hesychasts and heard descriptions of their practices, also reading the writings of the teacher in Hesychasm of St Gregory Palamas, himself an Athonite monk. Trained in Western Scholastic theology, Barlaam was scandalised by Hesychasm and began to combat it both orally and in his writings. As a private teacher of theology in the Western Scholastic mode, Barlaam propounded a more intellectual and propositional approach to the knowledge of God than the Hesychasts taught. Hesychasm is a form of constant purposeful prayer or experiential prayer, explicitly referred to as contemplation. Descriptions of the Hesychast practices can be found in the Philokalia, The Way of a Pilgrim, and St. John Climacus' The Ladder of Divine Ascent.

Barlaam took exception to, as heretical and blasphemous, the doctrine entertained by the Hesychasts as to the nature of the uncreated light, the experience of which was said to be the goal of Hesychast practice. It was maintained by the Hesychasts to be of divine origin and to be identical to that light which had been manifested to Jesus' disciples on Mount Tabor at the Transfiguration. This Barlaam held to be polytheistic, inasmuch as it postulated two eternal substances, a visible and an invisible God.

Gregory Palamas

On the Hesychast side, the controversy was taken up by St Gregory Palamas, afterwards Archbishop of Thessalonica, who was asked by his fellow monks on Mt Athos to defend Hesychasm from the attacks of Barlaam. St Gregory himself, was well-educated in Greek philosophy. St Gregory defended Hesychasm in the 1340s at three different synods in Constantinople, and he also wrote a number of works in its defence.

In these works, St Gregory Palamas uses a distinction, already found in the 4th century in the works of the Cappadocian Fathers, between the energies or operations (Gr. energies) of God and the essence (ousia) of God (see the Essence-Energies distinction). St Gregory taught that the energies or operations of God were uncreated. He taught that the essence of God can never be known by his creations even in the next life, but that his uncreated energies or operations can be known both in this life and in the next, and convey to the Hesychast in this life and to the righteous in the next life a true spiritual knowledge of God (see theoria). In Palamite theology, it is the uncreated energies of God that illumine the Hesychast who has been vouchsafed an experience of the Uncreated Light. Palamas referred to this experience as an apodictic (see Aristotle) validation of God rather than a scholastic contemplative or dialectical validation of God.

Synods

In 1341 the dispute came before a synod held at Constantinople and was presided over by the Emperor Andronicus; the synod, taking into account the regard in which the writings of the pseudo-Dionysius were held, condemned Barlaam, who recanted and returned to Calabria, afterwards becoming a bishop in the Roman Catholic Church.

One of Barlaam's friends, Gregory Akindynos, who originally was also a close friend of St Gregory Palamas, took up the controversy, and three other synods on the subject were held, at the second of which the followers of Barlaam gained a brief victory. But in 1351 at a synod under the presidency of the Emperor John VI Cantacuzenus, Hesychast doctrine was established as the doctrine of the Orthodox Church.

Aftermath

Up to this day, the Roman Catholic Church has never fully accepted Hesychasm, especially the distinction between the energies or operations of God and the essence of God, and the notion that those energies or operations of God are uncreated. In Roman Catholic theology as it has developed since the Scholastic period c. 1100–1500, the essence of God can be known, but only in the next life; the grace of God is always created; and the essence of God is pure act, so that there can be no distinction between the energies or operations and the essence of God (see, e.g., the Summa Theologiae of St Thomas Aquinas). Some of these positions depend on Aristotelian metaphysics.

Views of modern historians

The contemporary historians Cantacuzenus and Nicephorus Gregoras deal very copiously with this subject, taking the Hesychast and Barlaamite sides respectively. Respected fathers of the church have held that these councils that agree that experiential prayer is Orthodox, refer to these as councils as Ecumenical Councils Eight and Nine. Father John S. Romanides, Hierotheos (Vlachos) of Nafpaktos, and the Very Rev. Prof. Dr. George Metallinos, Professor of theology at Athens Greece (see gnosiology).

=== Avignon Papacy (1309–1378) and Western Schism (1378–1417) ===
Map showing support for Avignon (red) and Rome (blue) during the Western Schism

The Western Schism, or Papal Schism, was a prolonged period of crisis in Latin Christendom from 1378 to 1416, when there were two or more claimants to the See of Rome and there was conflict concerning the rightful holder of the papacy. The conflict was political, rather than doctrinal, in nature.

In 1309, Pope Clement V, due to political considerations, moved to Avignon in southern France and exercised his pontificate there. For sixty-nine years popes resided in Avignon rather than Rome. This was not only an obvious source of confusion but of political animosity as the prestige and influence of the city of Rome waned without a resident pontiff. Though Pope Gregory XI, a Frenchman, returned to Rome in 1378, the strife between Italian and French factions intensified, especially following his subsequent death. In 1378 the conclave, elected an Italian from Naples, Pope Urban VI; his intransigence in office soon alienated the French cardinals, who withdrew to a conclave of their own, asserting the previous election was invalid since its decision had been made under the duress of a riotous mob. They elected one of their own, Robert of Geneva, who took the name Pope Clement VII. By 1379, he was back in the palace of popes in Avignon, while Urban VI remained in Rome.

For nearly forty years, there were two papal curias and two sets of cardinals, each electing a new pope for Rome or Avignon when death created a vacancy. Each pope lobbied for support among kings and princes who played them off against each other, changing allegiance according to political advantage. In 1409, a council was convened at Pisa to resolve the issue. The Council of Pisa declared both existing popes to be schismatic (Gregory XII from Rome, Benedict XIII from Avignon) and appointed a new one, Alexander V. But the existing popes refused to resign and thus there were three papal claimants. Another council was convened in 1414, the Council of Constance. In March 1415 the Pisan pope, John XXIII, fled from Constance in disguise; he was brought back a prisoner and deposed in May. The Roman pope, Gregory XII, resigned voluntarily in July. The Avignon pope, Benedict XIII, refused to come to Constance; nor would he consider resignation. The council finally deposed him in July 1417. The council in Constance, having finally cleared the field of popes and antipopes, elected Pope Martin V as pope in November.

=== Criticism of Church corruption - John Wycliff and Jan Hus ===
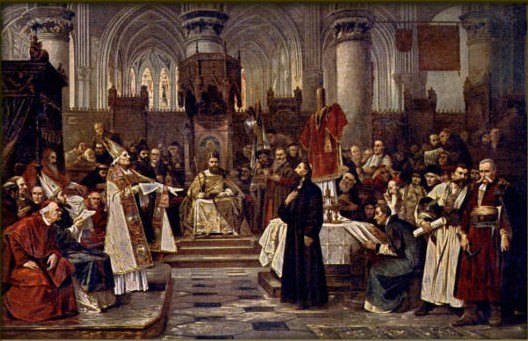
Painting of Jan Hus in Council of Constance by Václav Brožík.

John Wycliffe (or Wyclif) (1330–1384) was an English scholar best known for denouncing the corruptions of the Church, and his sponsoring the first translation of the Bible from Latin into English. He was a precursor of the Protestant Reformation. He emphasized the supremacy of the Bible, and called for a direct relationship between man and God, without interference by priests and bishops. Declared a heretic after his death, his followers, called Lollards, faced persecution by the Church of England. They went underground for over a century and played a role in the English Reformation.

Jan Hus (or Huss) (1369?–1415) a Czech theologian in Prague, was influenced by Wycliffe and spoke out against the corruptions he saw in the Church; his continued defiance led to his excommunication and condemnation by the Council of Constance, which also condemned John Wycliff. Hus was executed in 1415, but his followers arose in open rebellion. Between 1420 and 1431, the followers of Hus, known as Hussites, defeated five consecutive papal crusades. The wars ended in 1436 with the ratification of the compromise Compacts of Basel by the Church and the Hussites. Hus was a forerunner of the Protestant Reformation and his memory has become a powerful symbol of Czech culture in Bohemia.

=== Italian Renaissance ===
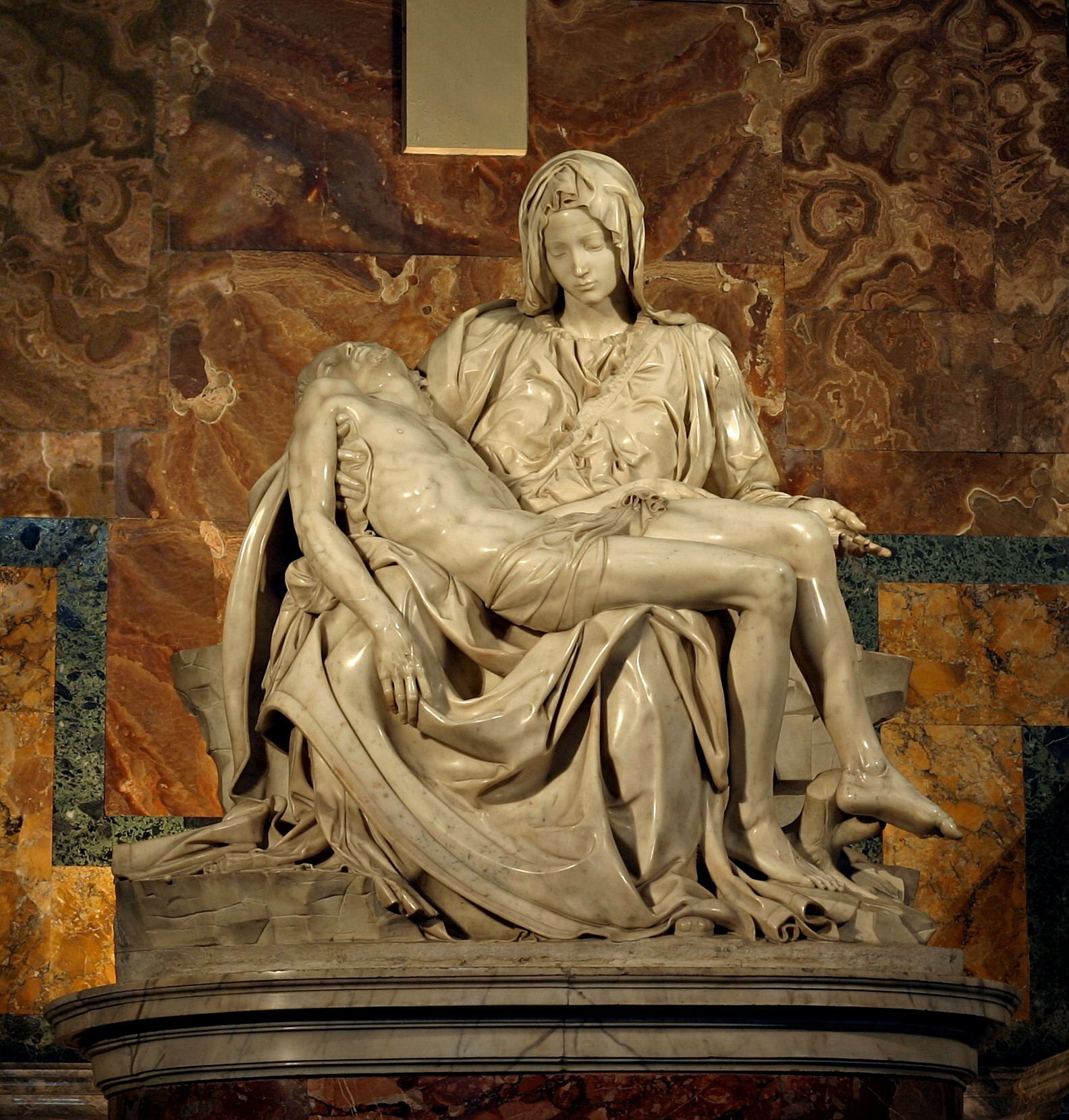
Michelangelo's Pietà in St. Peter's Basilica, Vatican City

The Renaissance was a period of great cultural change and achievement, marked in Italy by a classical orientation and an increase of wealth through mercantile trade. The city of Rome, the Papacy, and the Papal States were all affected by the Renaissance. On the one hand, it was a time of great artistic patronage and architectural magnificence, where the Church pardoned such artists as Michelangelo, Brunelleschi, Bramante, Raphael, Fra Angelico, Donatello, and Leonardo da Vinci. On the other hand, wealthy Italian families often secured episcopal offices, including the papacy, for their own members, some of whom were known for immorality, such as Alexander VI and Sixtus IV.

In addition to being the head of the Church, the Pope became one of Italy's most important secular rulers, and pontiffs such as Julius II often waged campaigns to protect and expand their temporal domains. Furthermore, the popes, in a spirit of refined competition with other Italian lords, spent lavishly both on private luxuries but also on public works, repairing or building churches, bridges, and a magnificent system of aqueducts in Rome that still function today. It was during this time that St. Peter's Basilica, perhaps the most recognised Christian church, was built on the site of the old Constantinian basilica. It was also a time of increased contact with Greek culture, opening up new avenues of learning, especially in the fields of philosophy, poetry, classics, rhetoric, and political science, fostering a spirit of humanism—all of which would influence the Church.

=== Fall of Constantinople (1453) ===
In 1453, Constantinople fell to the Ottoman Turks. Under Ottoman rule, the Greek Orthodox Church acquired substantial power as an autonomous millet. The ecumenical patriarch was the religious and administrative ruler of the entire "Greek Orthodox nation" (Ottoman administrative unit), which encompassed all the Eastern Orthodox subjects of the Empire.

As a result of the Ottoman conquest and the fall of Constantinople, the entire Orthodox communion of the Balkans and the Near East became suddenly isolated from the West. For the next four hundred years, it would be confined within a hostile Islamic world, with which it had little in common religiously or culturally. This is, in part, due to this geographical and intellectual confinement that the voice of Eastern Orthodoxy was not heard during the Reformation in sixteenth-century Europe. As a result, this important theological debate often seems strange and distorted to the Orthodox. They never took part in it and thus neither Reformation nor Counter-Reformation is part of their theological framework.

==== Religious rights under the Ottoman Empire ====
The new Ottoman government that arose from the ashes of Byzantine civilization was neither primitive nor barbaric. Islam not only recognized Jesus as a great prophet, but tolerated Christians as another People of the Book. As such, the Church was not extinguished nor was its canonical and hierarchical organisation significantly disrupted. Its administration continued to function. One of the first things that Mehmet the Conqueror did was to allow the Church to elect a new patriarch, Gennadius Scholarius. The Hagia Sophia and the Parthenon, which had been Christian churches for nearly a millennium were, admittedly, converted into mosques.

However, these rights and privileges (see Dhimmitude), including freedom of worship and religious organisation, were often established in principle but seldom corresponded to reality. The legal privileges of the patriarch and the Church depended, in fact, on the whim and mercy of the Sultan and the Sublime Porte, while all Christians were viewed as little more than second-class citizens. Moreover, Turkish corruption and brutality were not a myth. That it was the "infidel" Christian who experienced this more than anyone else is not in doubt. Nor were pogroms of Christians in these centuries unknown (see Greco-Turkish relations).

== See also ==
- History of Christian theology
- History of the Roman Catholic Church
- History of the Eastern Orthodox Church
- Christianization
- Timeline of Christianity
- Timeline of Christian missions
- Catholic–Protestant relations

== Print resources ==
- Arnold, John H., ed. (2014). The Oxford Handbook of Medieval Christianity. Oxford: Oxford University Press. ISBN 9780199582136.
- González, Justo L. (1984). The Story of Christianity: Vol. 1: The Early Church to the Reformation. San Francisco: Harper. ISBN 0-06-063315-8.
- Grabar, André (1968). Christian iconography, a study of its origins. Princeton University Press. ISBN 0-691-01830-8.
- Guericke, Heinrich Ernst; et al. (1857). A Manual of Church History: Ancient Church History Comprising the First Six Centuries. New York: Wiley and Halsted.
- Hastings, Adrian (1999). A World History of Christianity. Grand Rapids: Wm. B. Eerdmans Publishing. ISBN 0-8028-4875-3.
- Latourette, Kenneth Scott (1975). A History of Christianity, Volume 1: Beginnings to 1500 (revised ed.). San Francisco: Harper. ISBN 0-06-064952-6. (paperback).
- Morris, Colin (1972). The discovery of the individual, 1050–1200. London: SPCK. ISBN 0-281-02346-8.
- Morris, Colin (1989). The papal monarchy : the western church from 1050 to 1250. Oxford: Clarendon. ISBN 0-19-826925-0.
- Morris, Colin (2006). The sepulchre of Christ and the medieval West : from the beginning to 1600. Oxford: Oxford University Press. ISBN 978-0-19-826928-1.
- Shelley, Bruce L. (1996). Church History in Plain Language (2nd ed.). Word Pub. ISBN 0-8499-3861-9.

=== Online sources ===
- Dictionary of the History of Ideas: Christianity in History
- Dictionary of the History of Ideas: Church as an Institution
- Sketches of Church History From AD 33 to the Reformation by Rev. J. C Robertson, M.A., Canon of CanterburyJoyce, Patrick Weston (1906). A smaller social history of ancient Ireland, treating of the government, military system, and law; religion, learning, and art; trades, industries, and commerce; manners, customs, and domestic life, of the ancient Irish people (PDF). London; New York : Longmans, Green, and Co.

History of Christianity: The Middle Ages
Preceded by: Late ancient Christianity / The Middle; Ages / Followed by: The; Reformation
BC	C1	C2	C3	C4	C5	C6	C7	C8	C9	C10
C11	C12	C13	C14	C15	C16	C17	C18	C19	C20	C21
