= Dagmara Bollová =

Slovak politician

Member of the National Council
- In office 15 October 2002 – 7 February 2006

Personal details
- Born: 16 September 1942 (age 83) Kopčany, Slovak Republic
- Party: Communist Party of Slovakia
- Education: Comenius University

Dagmara Bollová, also known as Dagmar Bollová (born 16 September 1942 in Kopčany) is a former Slovak politician, who served as an MP of the National Council between 2002 and 2006. She was elected on the Communist Party of Slovakia list. She graduated in Pedagogy from Comenius University and worked as a teacher and secondary school principal.

In 2006, she participated on an Organization for Security and Co-operation in Europe electoral monitoring mission in Belarus. In spite of witnessing irregularities, Bollová claimed the election were democratic "in line with the local customs".

In 2009 she ran in the 2009 Slovak presidential election as an independent candidate. She finished sixth, after receiving only 1.1% of the vote.
