= 2009 Slovak presidential election =

- 21 March 2009 (first round); 4 April 2009 (second round)
- Turnout: 43.62% (first round) ▼4.32pp 51.65% (second round) ▲8.15pp
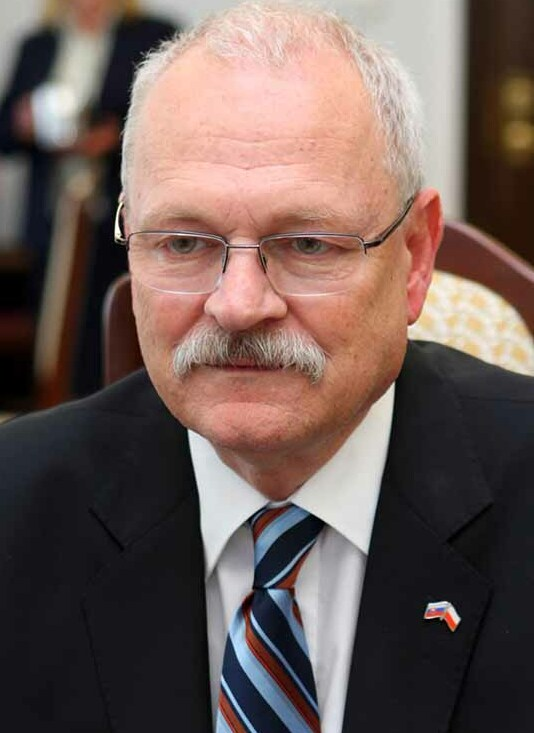

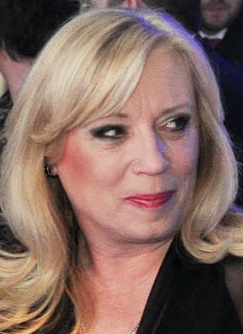
Nominee	Ivan Gašparovič	Iveta Radičová
Party	Independent (Note: Although Gašparovič was officially an independent, his campaign was endorsed and funded by Smer, SNS and HZD)	SDKÚ–DS
Popular vote	1,234,787	988,808
Percentage	55.53%	44.47%
President before election
Ivan Gašparovič
Independent
Elected President
Ivan Gašparovič
Independent

Presidential elections were held in Slovakia in March and April 2009, the country's third direct presidential elections. After no candidate received a majority of the vote in the first round on 21 March, the second round on 4 April saw Ivan Gašparovič become the first Slovak president to be re-elected, defeating opposition candidate Iveta Radičová by 56% to 44%.

== Candidates ==
There were seven candidates for the first round, which was held on 21 March:

- Ivan Gašparovič: incumbent president, supported by governing parties Direction – Social Democracy and Slovak National Party, and extra-parliamentary Movement for Democracy
- Iveta Radičová: candidate of the Slovak Democratic and Christian Union – Democratic Party, supported by the Party of the Hungarian Coalition, Christian Democratic Movement and Civic Conservative Party
- František Mikloško: candidate of the Conservative Democrats of Slovakia
- Zuzana Martináková: candidate of the Free Forum
- Milan Melník: independent candidate supported by the governing People's Party – Movement for a Democratic Slovakia
- Milan Sidor: independent candidate supported by the Communist Party of Slovakia
- Dagmara Bollová: independent candidate, former member of the Communist Party of Slovakia

Gašparovič and Radičová advanced to the second round, winning 46.7% and 38.1% of the first round votes, respectively. Slovak women tended to be more supportive of Radičová.

In the second round of elections, held on 4 April, Gašparovič received 1,234,787 votes (55.5%), winning election. Radičová received 44.5% of the vote. After the election, Gašparovič said, "I am glad I can be standing here today with the prime minister and the speaker of the parliament ... The [election] is the most direct evidence that people trust us."

== Results ==
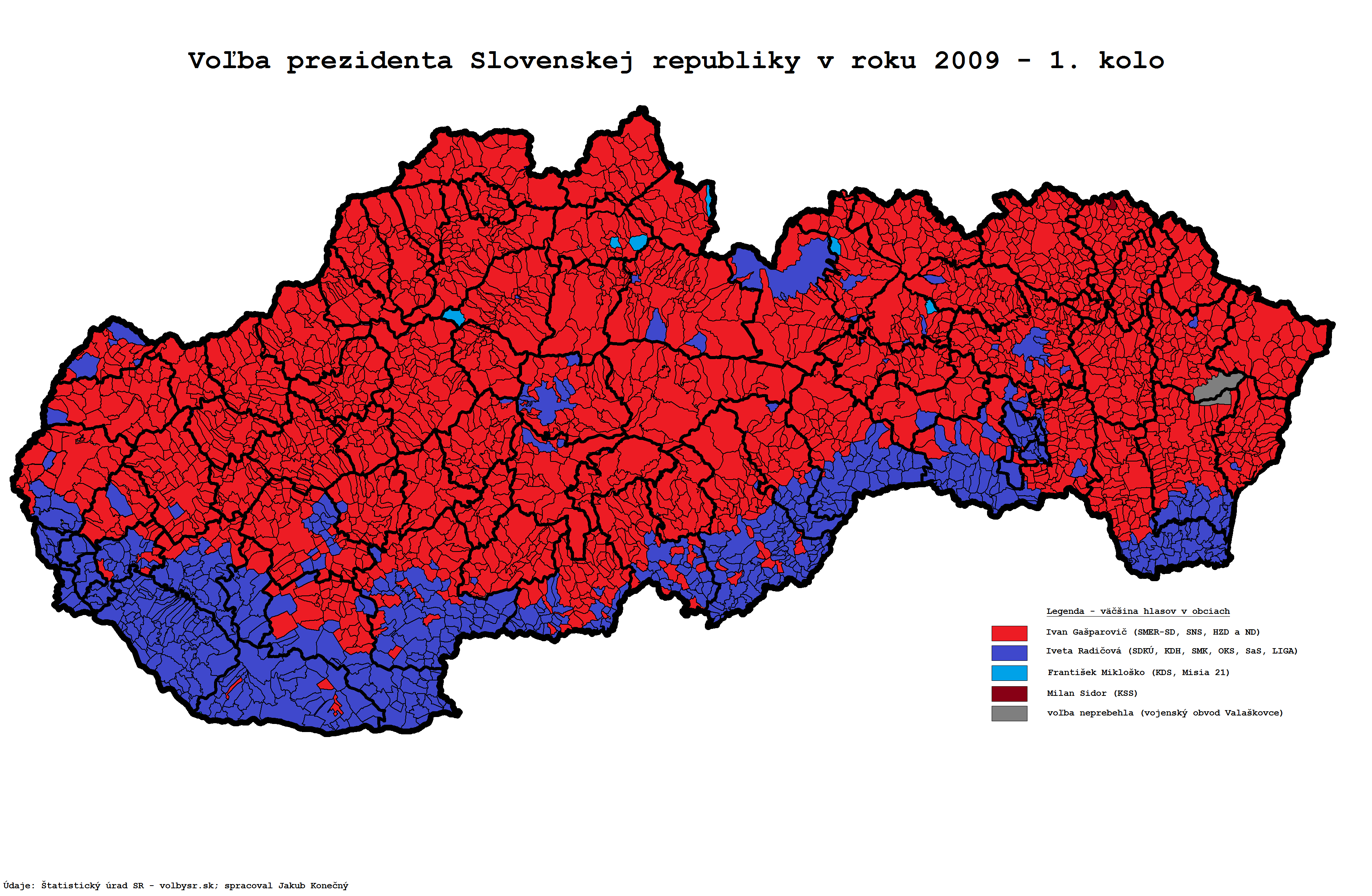
First round results by municipality

Voter turnout was 44% in the first round and 52% in the second round. Voter turnout among women slightly increased in both the first and second rounds of the election, which was attributed to Radičová's candidacy.

Candidate	Party	First round		Second round	
Candidate	Party	Votes	%	Votes	%
Ivan Gašparovič	Independent	876,061	46.71	1,234,787	55.53
Iveta Radičová	Slovak Democratic and Christian Union – Democratic Party	713,735	38.05	988,808	44.47
František Mikloško	Conservative Democrats of Slovakia	101,573	5.42		
Zuzana Martináková	Free Forum	96,035	5.12		
Milan Melník	People's Party – Movement for a Democratic Slovakia	45,985	2.45		
Dagmara Bollová	Independent	21,378	1.14		
Milan Sidor	Communist Party of Slovakia	20,862	1.11		
Total		1,875,629	100.00	2,223,595	100.00
Valid votes		1,875,629	99.10	2,223,595	99.21
Invalid/blank votes		17,040	0.90	17,767	0.79
Total votes		1,892,669	100.00	2,241,362	100.00
Registered voters/turnout		4,339,331	43.62	4,339,331	51.65
Source: IFES, IFES

=== By region ===
==== First round ====
Region	Gašparovič	Radičová	Mikloško	Martináková	Melník	Bollová	Sidor
Bratislava Region	33.21	52.60	6.75	4.74	1.62	0.84	0.56
Trnava Region	37.80	49.90	4.73	4.08	1.64	1.28	0.57
Trenčín Region	57.23	26.17	4.59	5.98	3.38	1.44	1.21
Nitra Region	43.29	45.24	3.70	4.23	1.92	0.91	0.72
Žilina Region	56.22	26.10	6.75	5.53	3.15	1.23	1.02
Banská Bystrica Region	51.09	35.80	3.18	5.22	2.23	1.23	1.23
Prešov Region	52.52	27.15	8.55	5.75	2.75	1.20	2.09
Košice Region	42.26	41.97	5.00	5.37	2.92	1.06	1.43
Total in Slovakia	46.71	38.05	5.41	5.12	2.45	1.13	1.11
Cities	42.20	42.54	5.61	5.35	2.11	1.09	1.06
Villages	52.28	32.49	5.16	4.82	2.86	1.19	1.16

==== Second round ====
Region	Ivan Gašparovič	Iveta Radičová
Bratislava Region	38.80	61.20
Trnava Region	42.17	57.89
Trenčín Region	70.76	29.24
Nitra Region	46.07	53.93
Žilina Region	70.52	29.48
Banská Bystrica Region	59.32	40.68
Prešov Region	66.54	33.46
Košice Region	50.69	49.31
Total in Slovakia	55.53	44.47
Cities	50.73	49.27
Villages	61.29	38.71
