= Church of Saint Margaret of Antioch, Kopčany =

Church of Saint Margaret of Antioch
- Kostol svätej Margity Antiochijskej
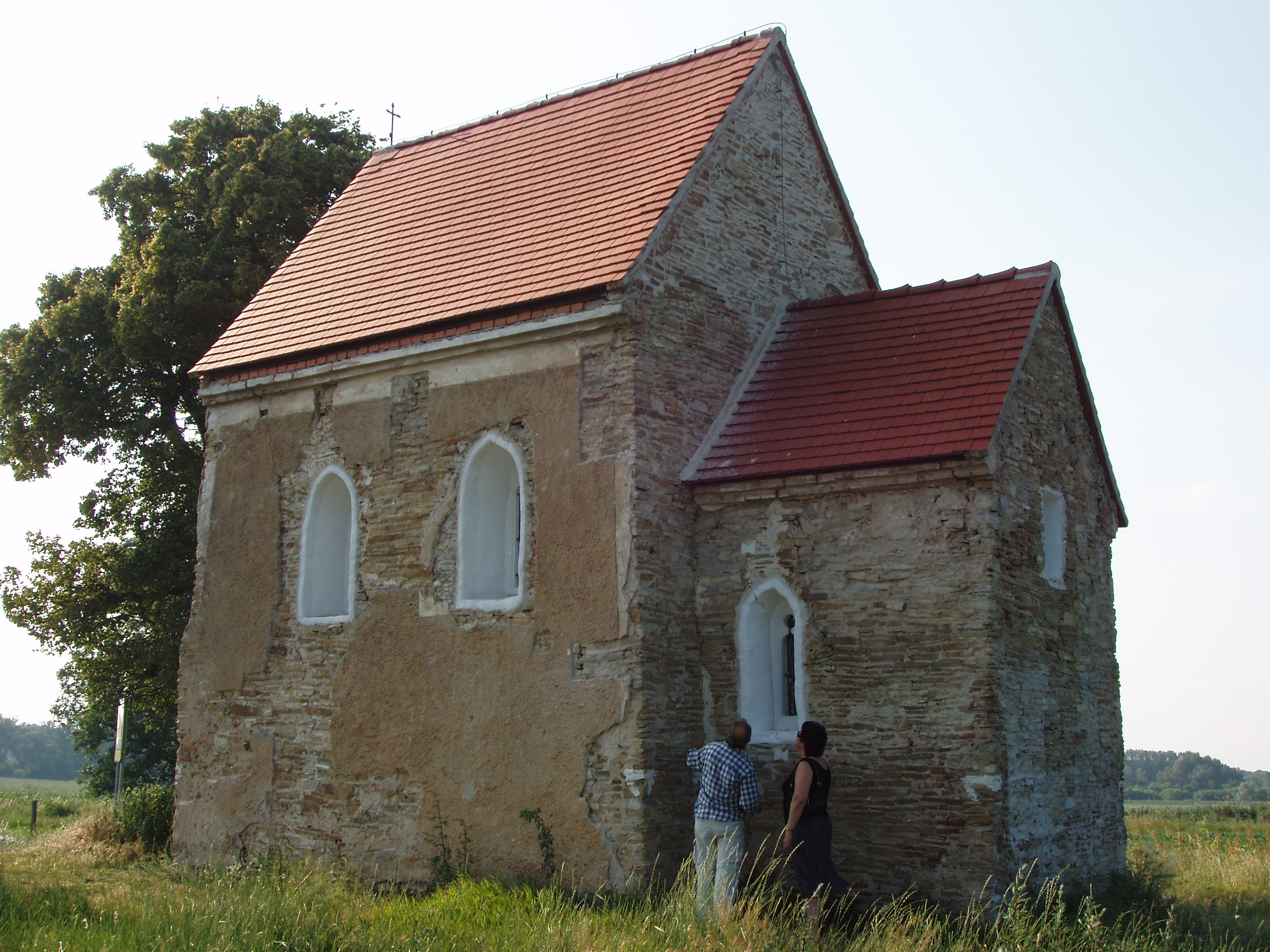
- View from the north

- Location within Slovakia
- 48.796213°N 17.108741°E
- Location: Skalica, Trnava
- Country: Slovakia
- Denomination: Catholic Church

Architecture
- Years built: 9th or 10th century

The church of Saint Margaret of Antioch near Kopčany, Slovakia, is the only church built during the Greater Moravian period that is still standing. It is one of the oldest churches in Slovakia. It was built in the 9th or 10th century and was first mentioned in 1329. It was used until the 18th century when a new church was built in the village centre of Kopčany.

== Description ==
The church is an original pre-Romanesque building. It is a single-cell church with a small rectangular chancel to the east. The recent excavations have shown that the original church had a rectangular narthex at the west end of the church, and this contained a large stone lined tomb for the founding figure of the church. When the narthex was pulled down, the Gothic arch which formed the entry at the west end was inserted.

Since 1995, the church has been listed under Slovak cultural heritage. The outside of the church is openly accessible to the public. It stands in a field to the east of Kopčany and it is about 1.6 km from the major Greater Moravian site at Mikulčice, which is on the other side of the Morava river. It is approached by a road and is fairly close to the ruins of an 18th-century building, which was used along with a nearby former lake, for catching ducks.

== History of the research ==
The small church near the Czech–Slovak border has long been considered a Baroque chapel and its dating had a stormy development. The first architectural survey of the church was conducted in 1964 and refined dating to Gothic period. In 1996, Viktor Ferus published a hypothesis about the Great Moravian origin of the building. During investigations in 2004, three graves and jewellery from the times of Great Moravia were found outside the church. The position of graves already respected the position of the church and the graves contained mortar from the building and the size and shape of fragments indices that they originate from the construction phase and not later destruction. In that times, the church was considered to be the only one still standing Great Moravian building in Czechia and Slovakia. The key challenge is to validate if the mortar could be introduced to the older horizon during excavating of the younger graves. In 2013, a collective of authors analysed a piece of wood from the building by dendrochronology, declaring that it can be dated to 951, which shifts the construction phase to the 2nd part of the 10th century, between the fall of the Great Moravia and the foundation of the Kingdom of Hungary. Neither these results were universally accepted and are under further validation.

Currently, archaeological research is focused on the reconstruction of the historical landscape and its settlements. Also during this period the church has undergone further restoration work and the old render has been stripped from the walls. This now shows that the two arched windows on the north side of the nave are original while the windows on the south side were altered in the later Romanesque period.

== Gallery ==
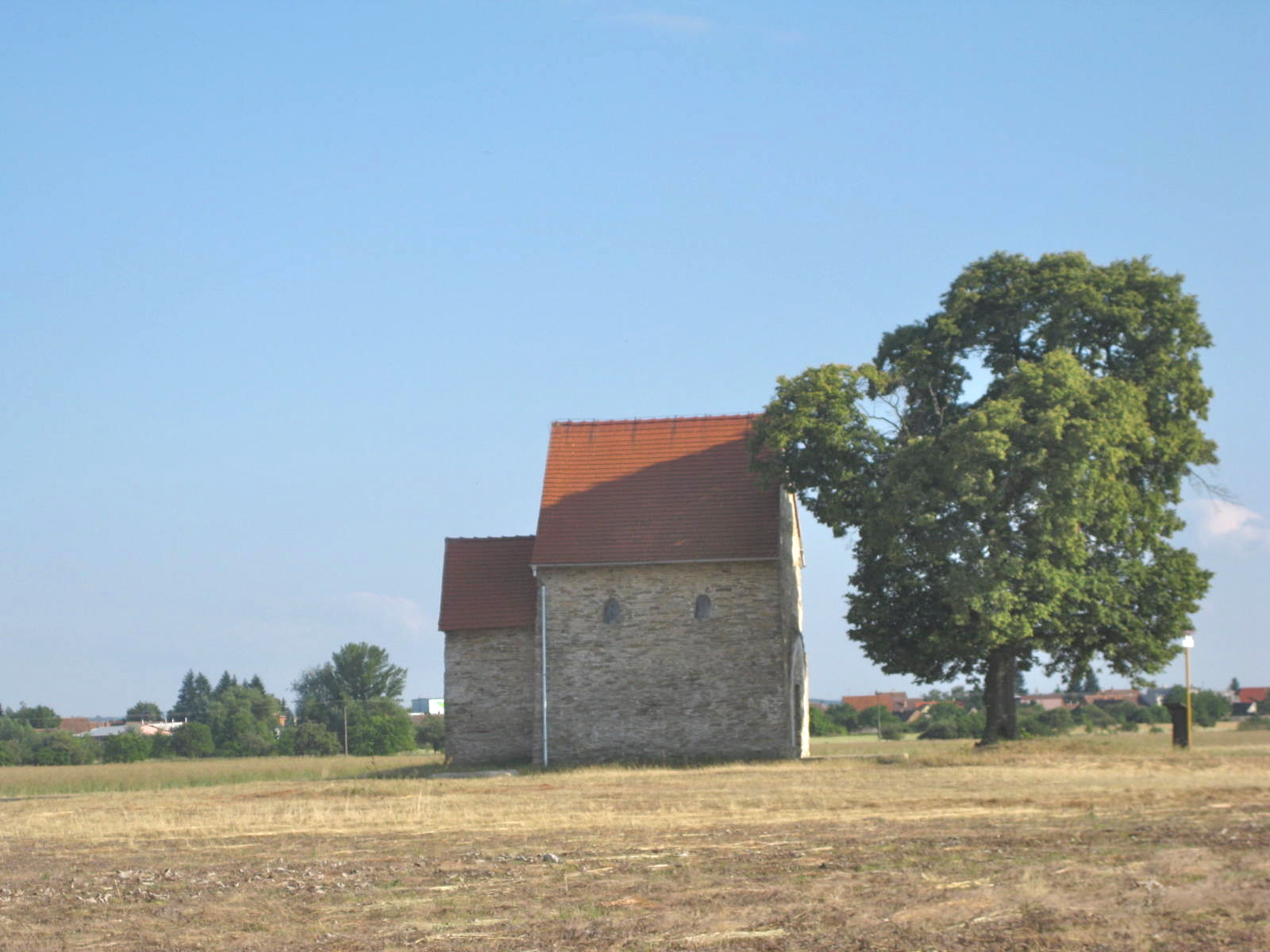
Church of St Margaret of Antioch, Kopčany, Slovakia

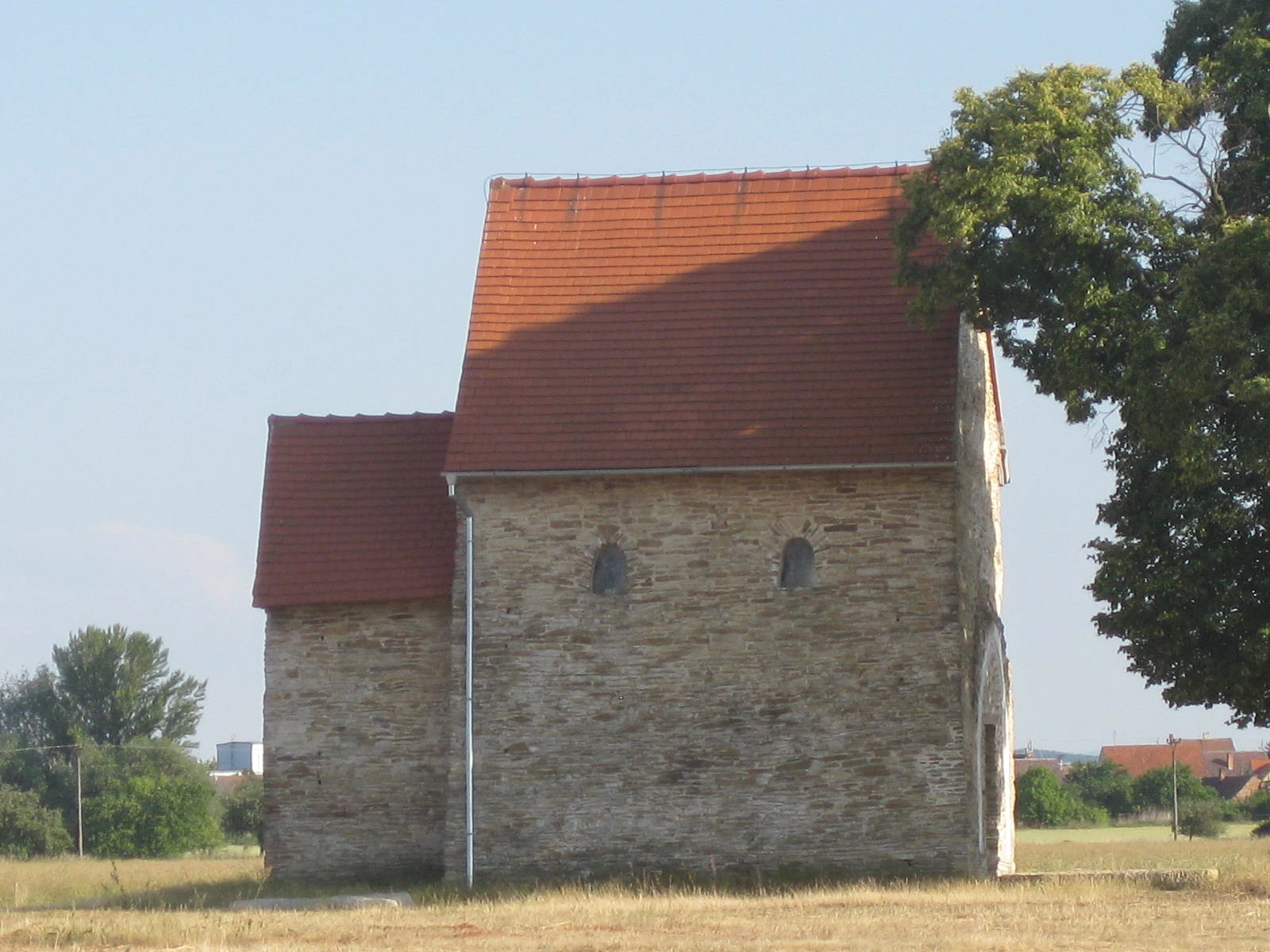
N Side showing the original windows.

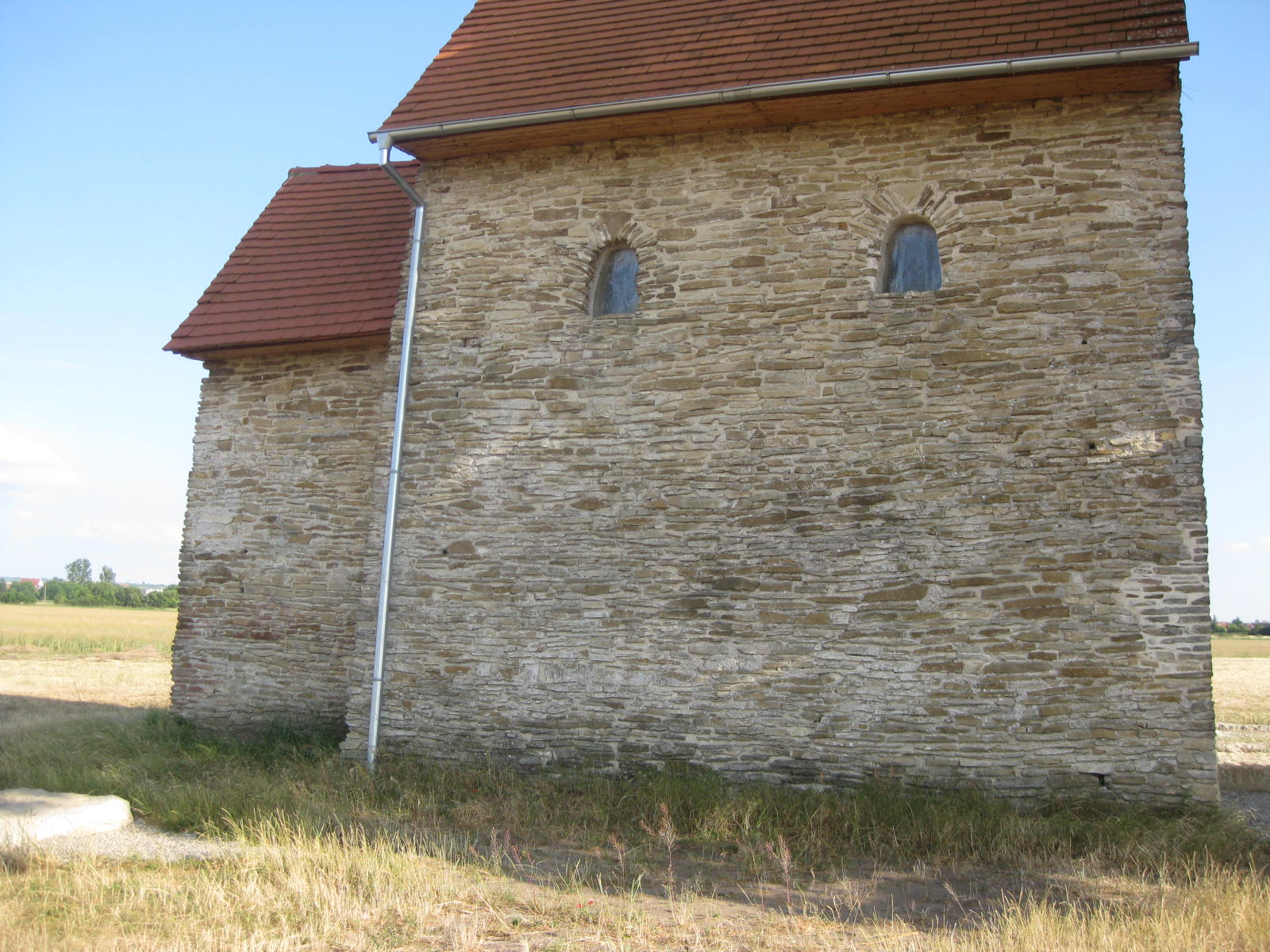
N side showing original arched windows with keystone.

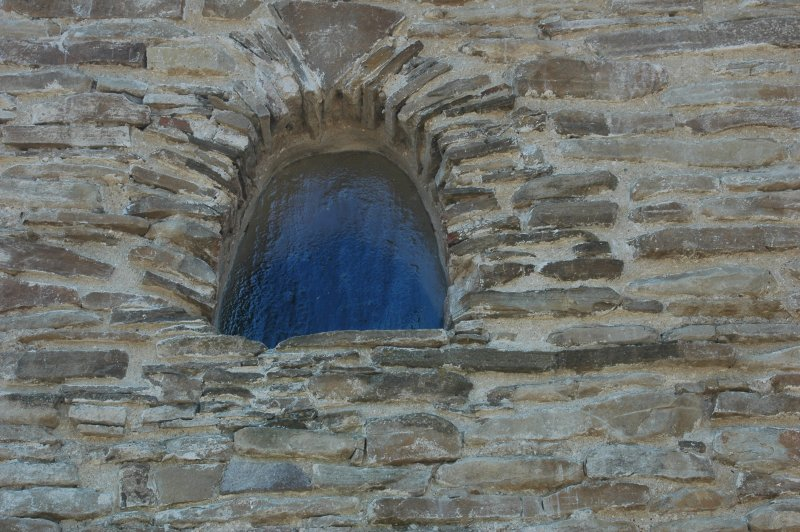
Original window with triangular keystone.

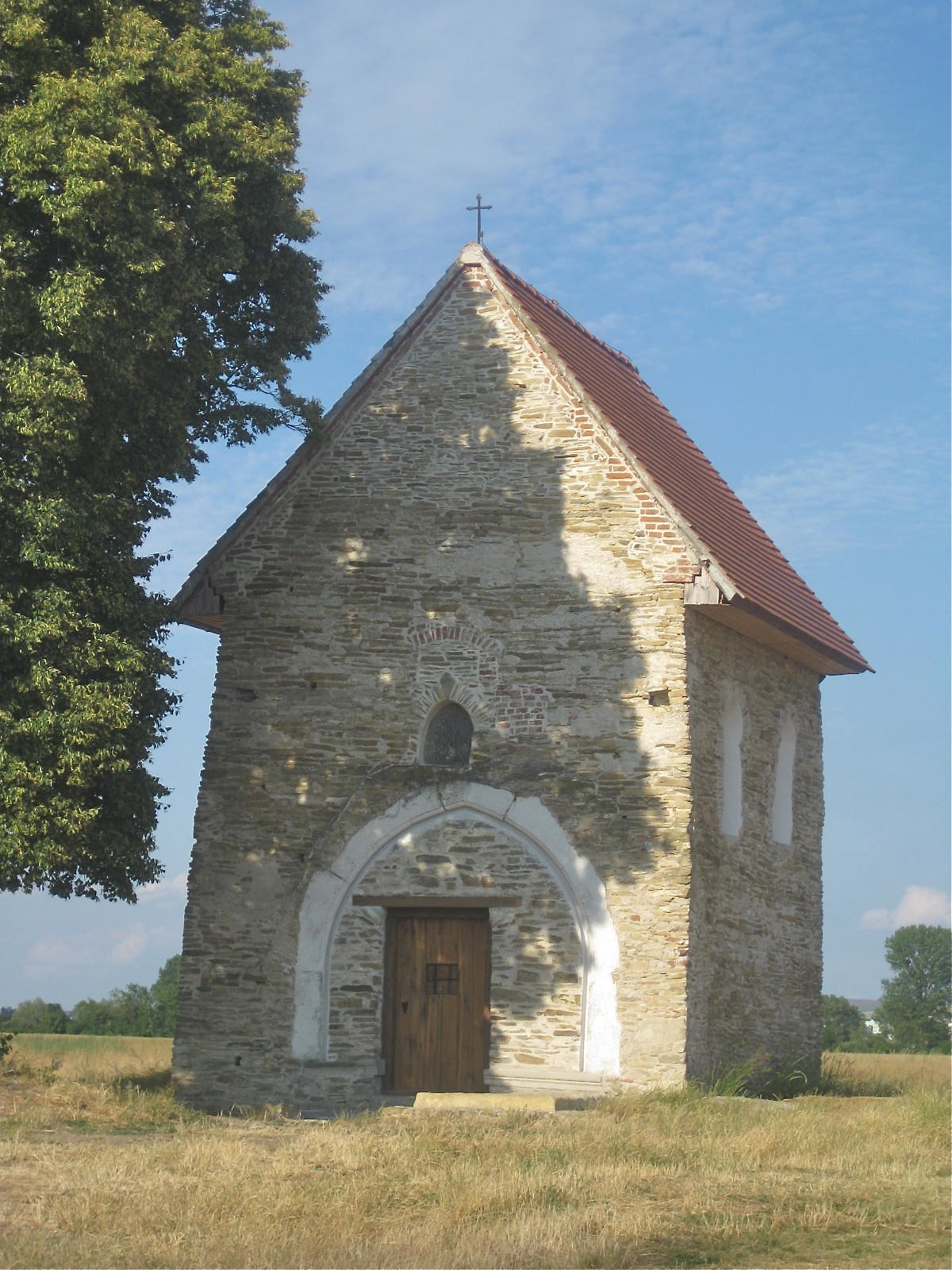
Gothic arch at W end with traces of original window above.

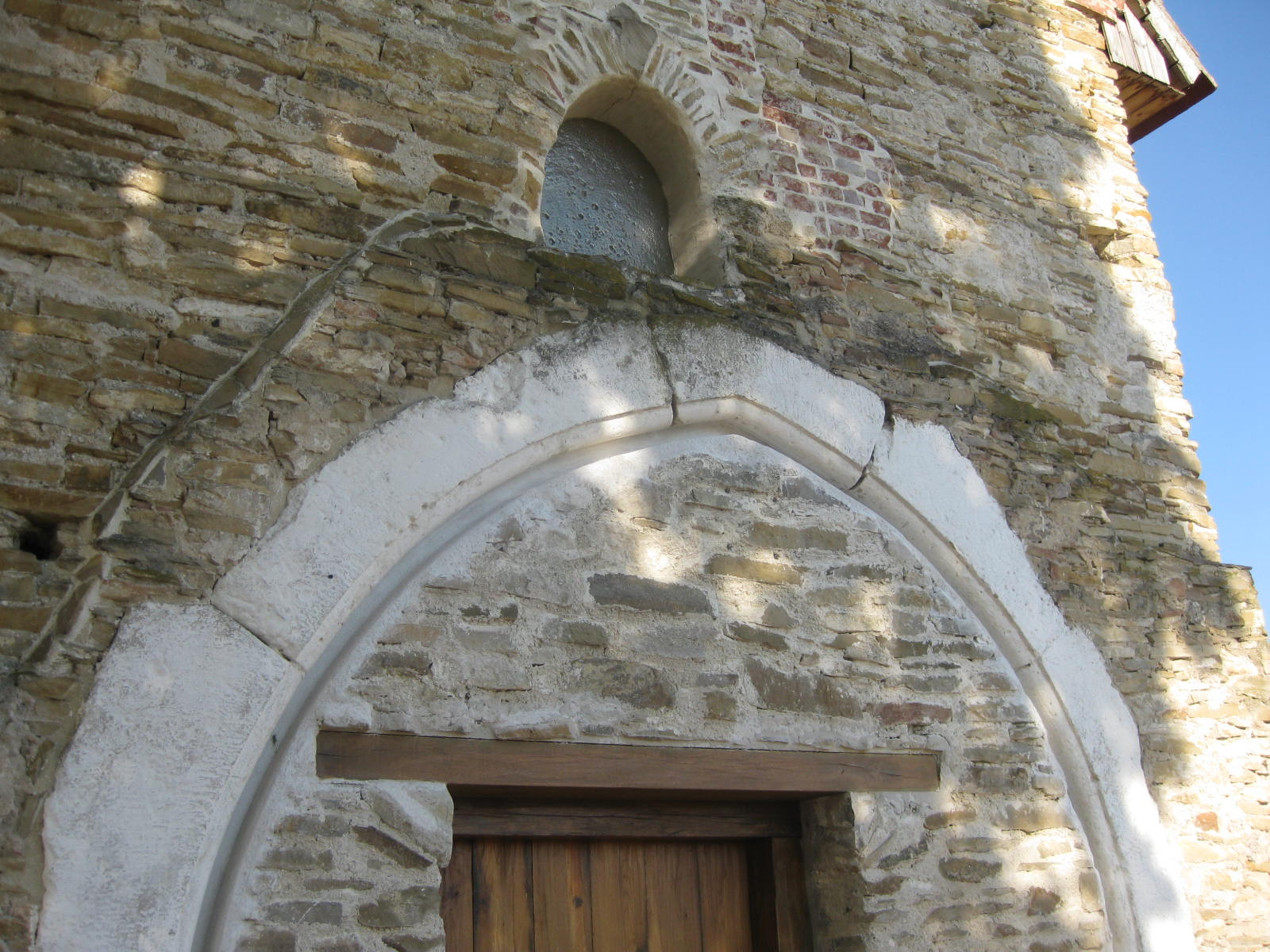
W end Gothic arch with original window above.

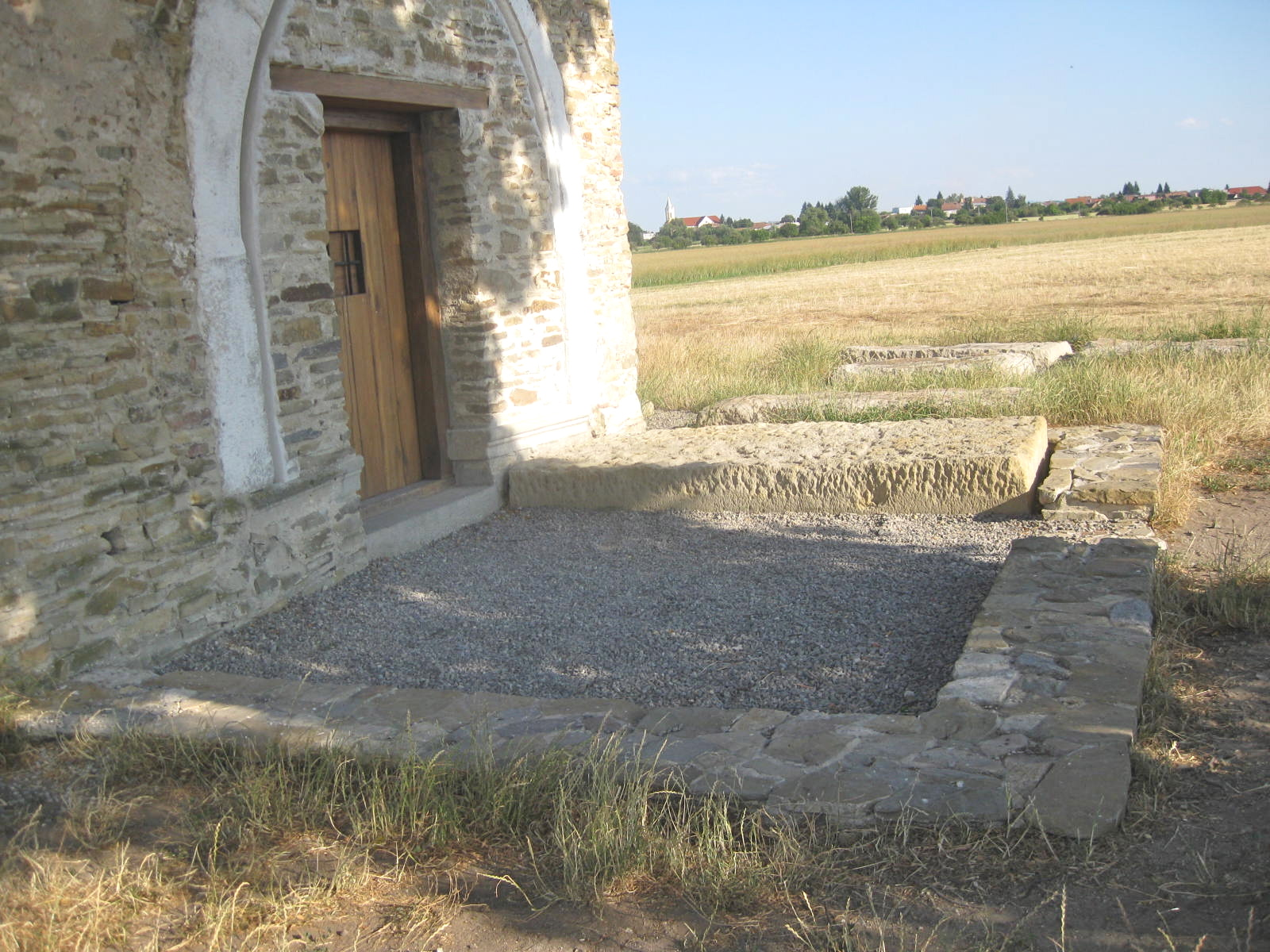
Outline of Narthex revealed by excavations.

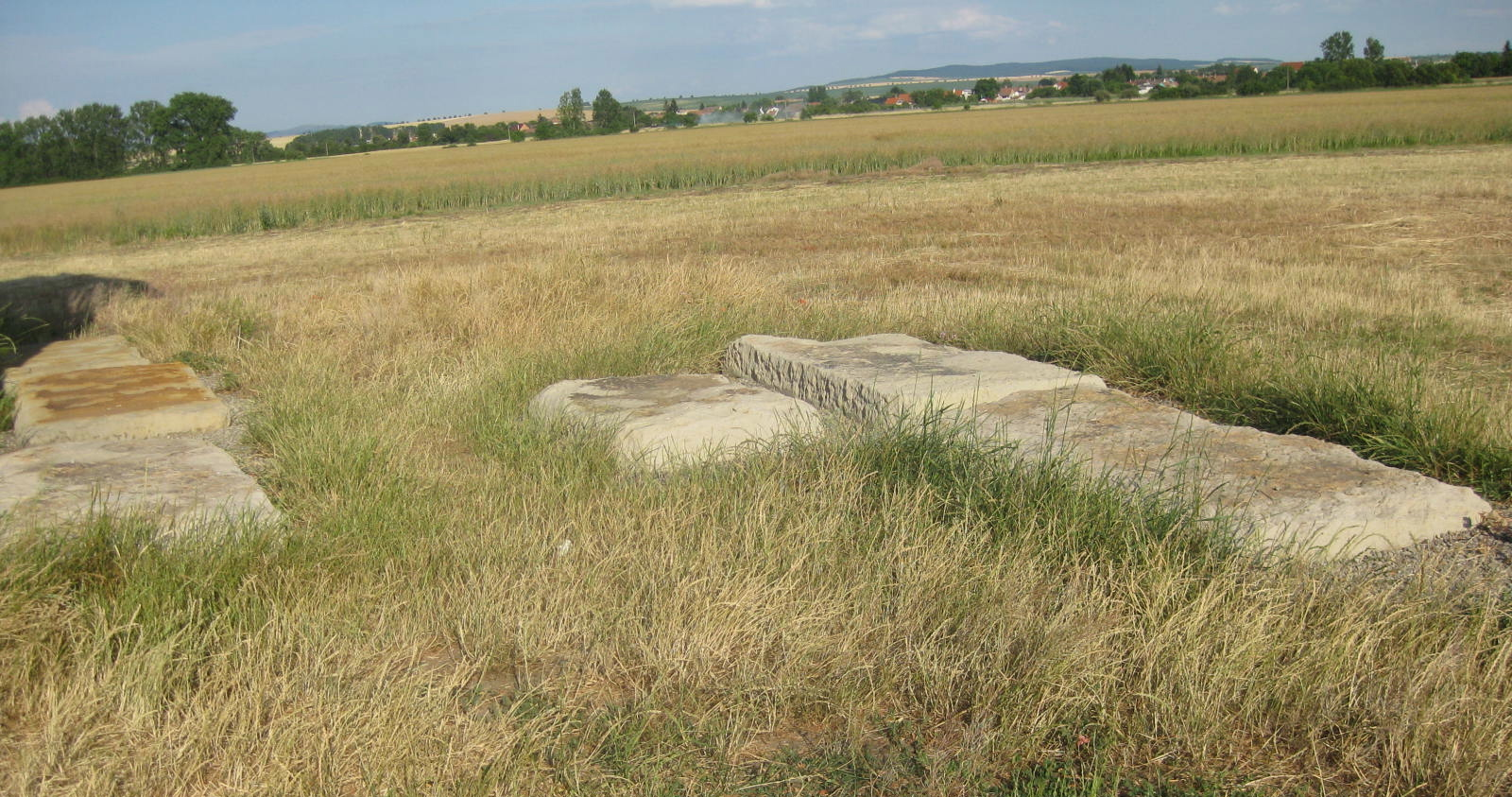
Slabs outside the church showing position of 9th-10th century graves.

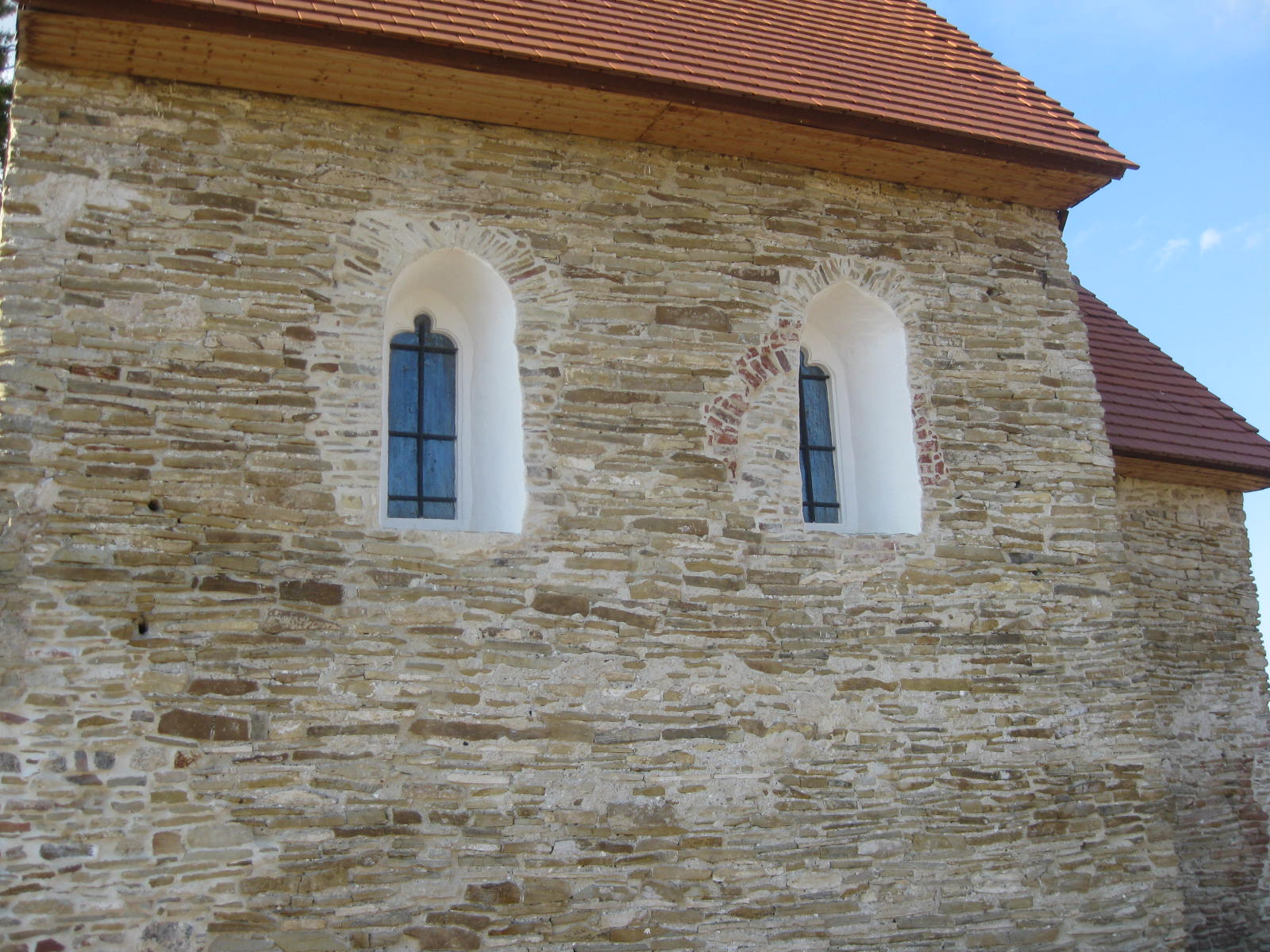
Windows on S of nave showing alterations and evidence for an earlier window.

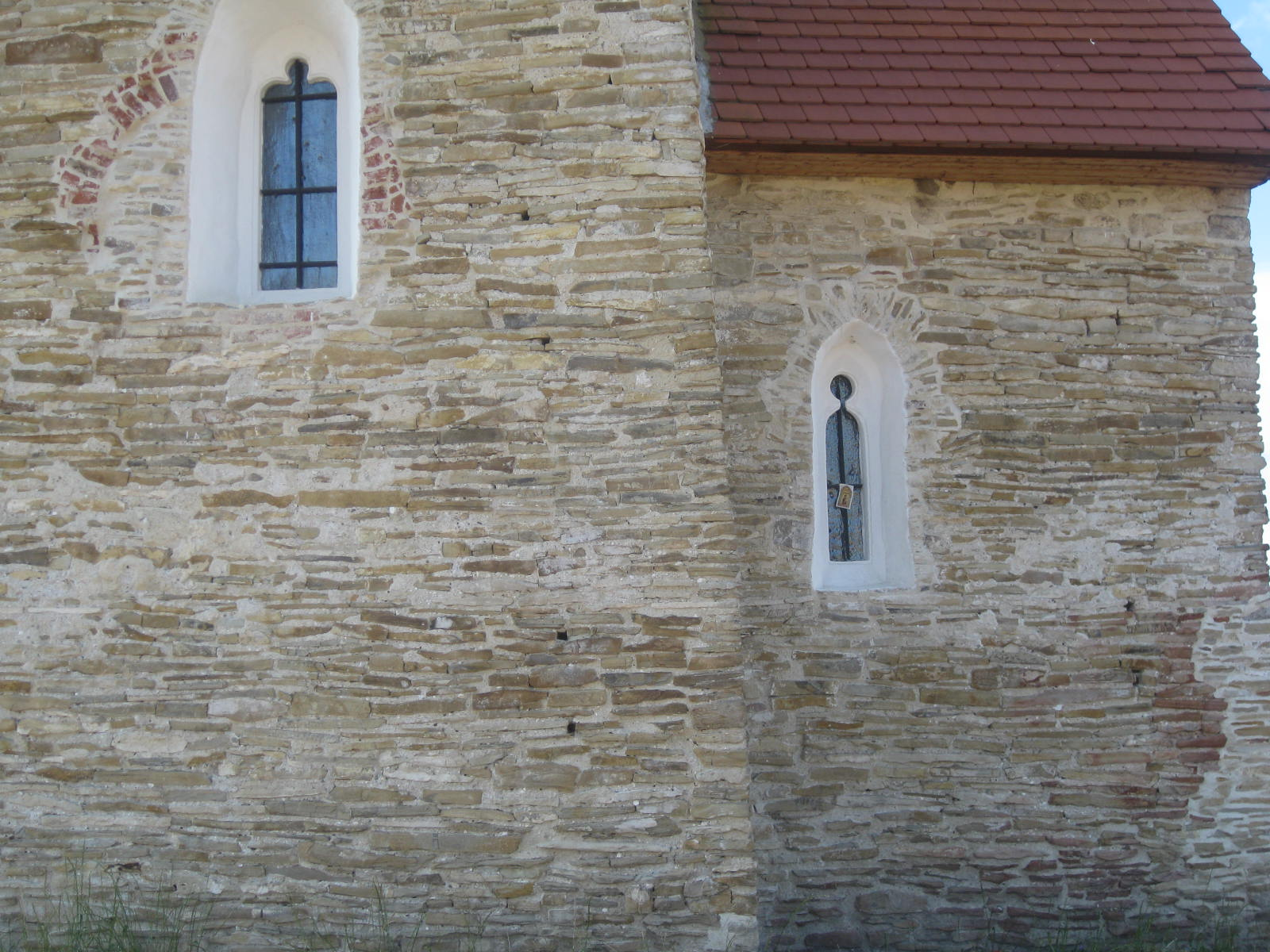
S windows on Nave and Chancel

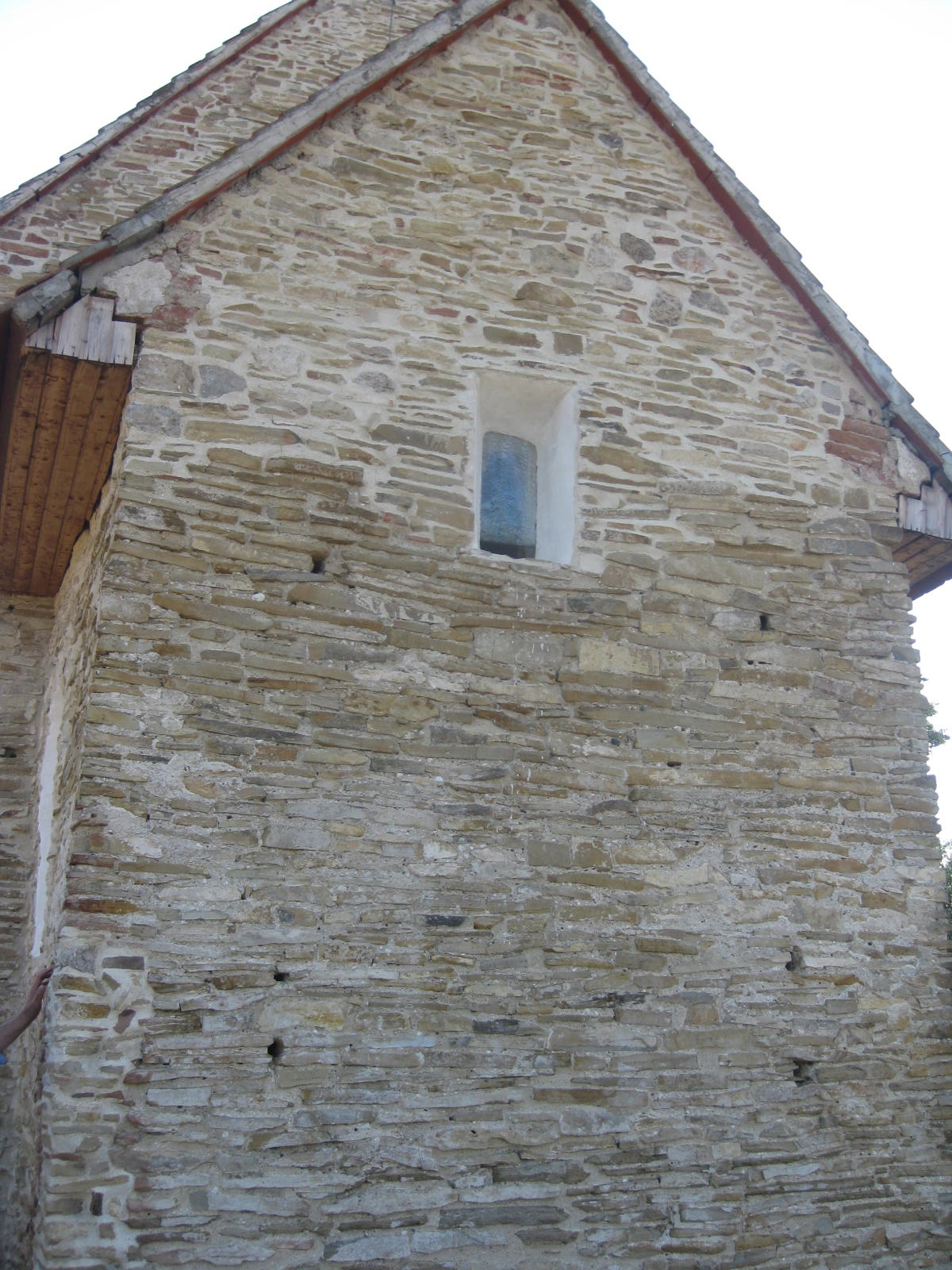
E window in Nave

== Sources ==
- Bahýl, Vladimír; Fleischer, Peter; Ľuboš, Vladimír; Mészáros, Tibor; Pastierovič, Martin; Štafura, Andrej (2013). "Je kostolík v Kopčanoch skutočne z obdobia Veľkej Moravy a organ v Štítniku zo štrnásteho storočia? Čo o tom hovorí dendrochronológia.". Zborník príspevkov konferencie CSTI 2013 Conservation Science, Technology and Industry, 20. – 22. február 2013 (PDF) (in Slovak). Bratislava: Slovenské národné múzeum. ISBN 978-80-227-3991-7.
- Botek, Andrej (2014). Veľkomoravské kostoly na Slovensku [The Great Moravian Churches in Slovakia] (in Slovak). Bratislava: Post Scriptum. ISBN 978-80-89567-37-9.
- Baxa, Peter; Ferus, Viktor; Glaser-Opitzová, Renáta (2005). "Nové poznatky o kaplnke sv. Margity Antiochijskej v Kopčanoch" [New knowledge about the Chapel of St. Margaret of Antioch in Kopčany] (in Slovak). Záhorské múzeum.
