= Kopčany =

Village in Slovakia

- Municipality
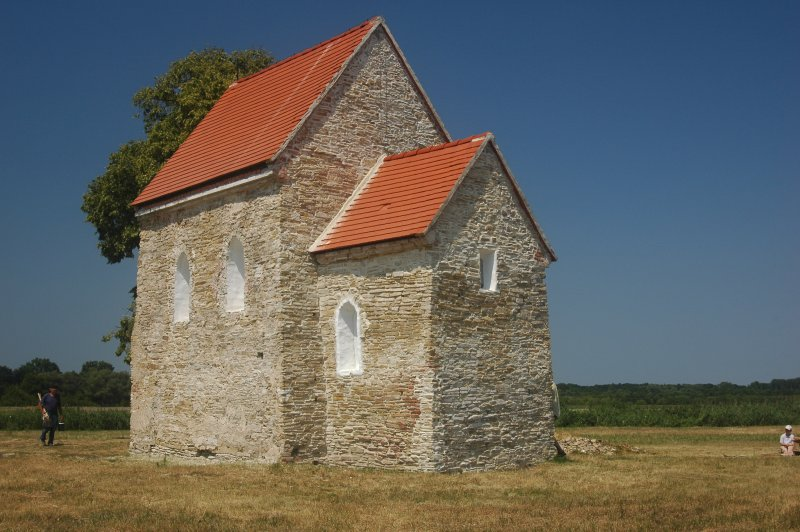
- The 10th-century St. Margaret's church

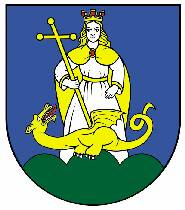
- Flag Coat of arms

- Location of Kopčany in the Trnava Region Location of Kopčany in Slovakia
- Coordinates: 48.79°N 17.12°E
- Country: Slovakia
- Region: Trnava Region
- District: Skalica District
- First mentioned: 1392

Area
  - Total: 22.11 km^{2} (8.54 sq mi)
- Elevation: 163 m (535 ft)

Population (2025)
  - Total: 2,537
- Time zone: UTC+1 (CET)
  - Summer (DST): UTC+2 (CEST)
- Postal code: 908 48
- Area code: +421 34
- Vehicle registration plate (until 2022): SI
- Website: www.kopcany.sk

Kopčany (German: Koptschan or Gopschein; Hungarian: Kopcsány) is a municipality and village in the Trnava Region of Slovakia. It lies near the border with the Czech Republic.

== Geography ==
The municipality lies at an altitude of 163 metres (535 ft) and covers an area of 22.11 km^{2} (8.54 sq mi) (2025).

== History ==
The oldest historical records to mention Kopčany date from 1392. However, the village is much older. In the 9th century, Kopčany was part of the agglomeration of Mikulčice, an important centre and possibly the capital of Great Moravia.

Kopčany is also the site of one of the oldest standing buildings for which a Great Moravian origin is postulated, the Church of St. Margaret of Antioch.

== Geography ==
The municipality has an altitude of 160 metres (520 ft) and an area of 21.829 square kilometres (8.428 sq mi). It is part of the Skalica District in the Trnava Region.

== Population ==
Population statistic (10 years)
Year	1995	2005	2015	2025
Count	2463	2575	2603	2537
Difference		+4.54%	+1.08%	−2.53%

Population statistic
Year	2024	2025
Count	2553	2537
Difference		−0.62%

It has a population of 2537 people (31 December 2025).

=== Ethnicity ===
Census 2021 (1+ %)
Ethnicity	Number	Fraction
Slovak	2363	92.48%
Not found out	150	5.87%
Czech	60	2.34%
Romani	52	2.03%
Total	2555	

In year 2021 was 2555 people by ethnicity 2363 as Slovak, 150 as Not found out, 60 as Czech, 52 as Romani, 8 as Romanian, 4 as German, 4 as Bulgarian, 3 as Other, 2 as Polish, 2 as Hungarian, 1 as Vietnamese, 1 as Italian, 1 as Rusyn, 1 as Moravian, 1 as Greek and 1 as Albanian.

Note on population: The difference values of population numbers in the table "Population statistic" and in the sections "Ethnicity" & "Religion" is caused by the use of various statistical methods.

=== Religion ===
Census 2021 (1+ %)
Religion	Number	Fraction
Roman Catholic Church	1308	51.19%
None	905	35.42%
Not found out	151	5.91%
Evangelical Church	124	4.85%
Total	2555	

In year 2021 was 2555 people by religion 1308 from Roman Catholic Church, 905 from None, 151 from Not found out, 124 from Evangelical Church, 15 from Jehovah's Witnesses, 10 from Seventh-day Adventist Church, 7 from Ad hoc movements, 5 from Christian Congregations in Slovakia, 5 from Greek Catholic Church, 4 from Other and not ascertained christian church, 4 from Buddhism, 4 from Apostolic Church, 3 from Eastern Orthodox Church, 2 from Other, 2 from United Methodist Church, 2 from Church of Jesus Christ of Latter-day Saints, 1 from Old Catholic Church, 1 from Paganism and natural spirituality, 1 from Islam and 1 from Hinduism.

== Notable people ==
- Izidor Kovárik (1917–1944), war pilot
- Dagmara Bollová (born 1942), politician

== See also ==
- List of municipalities and towns in Slovakia

== Genealogical resources ==
The records for genealogical research are available at the state archive "Štátný Archív in Bratislava, Slovakia"

- Roman Catholic church records (births/marriages/deaths): 1678–1910 (parish A)
- Lutheran church records (births/marriages/deaths): 1786–1895 (parish B)
