= Val =

Val may refer to:

== Military equipment ==
- Aichi D3A, a Japanese World War II dive bomber codenamed "Val" by the Allies
- AS Val, a Soviet assault rifle

== Music ==
- Val, album by Val Doonican
- VAL (band), Belarusian pop duo

== People ==
- Val (given name)
- Rafael Merry del Val (1865–1930), Spanish Catholic cardinal
- Val (sculptor) (1967–2016), French sculptor
- Val (footballer, born 1983), Lucivaldo Lázaro de Abreu, Brazilian football midfielder
- Val (footballer, born 1997), Valdemir de Oliveira Soares, Brazilian football defensive midfielder

== Places ==
- Val (Rychnov nad Kněžnou District), a municipality and village in the Czech Republic
- Val (Tábor District), a municipality and village in the Czech Republic
- Vál, a village in Hungary
- Val, Iran, a village in Kurdistan Province, Iran
- Val, Italy, a frazione in Cortina d'Ampezzo, Veneto, Italy
- Val, Bhiwandi, a village in Maharashtra, India

== Other uses ==
- Val (film), an American documentary about Val Kilmer, directed by Leo Scott and Ting Poo
- Val (2021 film), an American horror comedy film directed by Aaron Fradkin and co-written by Victoria Fratz
- Valley girl or Val, an American stereotype
- Abbreviation of the amino acid valine
- A weapon used in the Indian martial art of Kalarippayattu
- Vieques Air Link, a Puerto Rican airline company
- Radio Val 202, a Slovenian radio station

== See also ==
- VAL (disambiguation)
- Wal (disambiguation)
- Vala (disambiguation)
- Vale (disambiguation)
- Vali (disambiguation)
- Valo (disambiguation)
- Vals (disambiguation)
- Valy (disambiguation)
- Valk (surname)
- Vall (surname)
