= Valy =

Valy may refer to:

== Places ==
=== Czech Republic ===
- Valy (Cheb District), a municipality and village in the Karlovy Vary Region
- Valy (Pardubice District), a municipality and village in the Pardubice Region
- Valy, a village and part of Krompach in the Liberec Region
- Valy, a village and part of Plazy in the Central Bohemian Region
- Mikulčice-Valy, an archaeological site in the South Moravian Region

=== Ukraine ===
- Valy, a village in Karapchiv, Vyzhnytsia Raion, Ukraine

== People ==
- Valy Konaté (born 2006), Ivorian footballer

== See also ==
- Val (disambiguation)
- Vali (disambiguation)
