= Vall =

Vall is a surname. Notable people with the surname include:

- Ely Ould Mohamed Vall (1953-2017), Mauritanian military officer
- Raymond Vall (born 1942), French politician.

== See also ==
- Örjans Vall, football stadium in Halmstad, Sweden
- Vall, the Europa analog in Kerbal Space Program
- Valla (disambiguation)
- Valle (disambiguation)
- Valli (disambiguation)
- Valls (disambiguation)
- Val (disambiguation)
