= Valli (disambiguation) =

Valli is the consort of the Hindu god Murugan.

Valli may also refer to:

== People ==
- Alida Valli (1921-2006), sometimes known simply as Valli, Italian actress
- Celso Valli (1950–2025), Italian composer, arranger and record producer
- Éric Valli (born 1952), French photographer and film director
- Eusebio Valli (1755-1816), Italian physician and electrical researcher
- Frankie Valli (born 1934), Italian-American musician
- Geoff Valli (born 1954), New Zealand rugby union player
- Romolo Valli (1925-1980), Italian actor
- Valli Valli (1882-1927), English actress
- Viola Valli (born 1972), Italian swimmer
- Virginia Valli (1898-1968), American actress
- Valli O'Reilly, makeup artist (also known as Aunt Valli and Valle O'Reilly)

== Places ==
- Valli, Estonia
- Valli, Iran

== Arts and entertainment ==
- Valli (album), 1976 album by Frankie Valli
- Valli (film), a 1993 Indian Tamil-language film starring Rajinikanth
- Valli (TV series), a 2012 Indian Tamil-language soap opera

== See also ==
- Vall (surname)
- Vali (disambiguation)
