= VAL =

VAL may stand for:

- Variable Assembly Language, a computer-based control system and language designed specifically for use with Unimation Inc. industrial robots
- Vatican lira, the currency of the Vatican City between 1929 and 2002
- Véhicule Automatique Léger, a type of automatic rubber-tired people mover technology
- Vieques Air Link, an airline
- VAL (duo), made up of Valeria Gribusova and Vlad Pashkevich, Belarus duo representing their country in Eurovision Song Contest 2020
- Vulnerability Assessment Laboratory, an Army research institution that specialized in electronic warfare.
- Bedford VAL, British chassis for buses and coaches produced between 1962 and 1972

== See also ==
- Val (disambiguation)
