= Mikulčice =

- Municipality
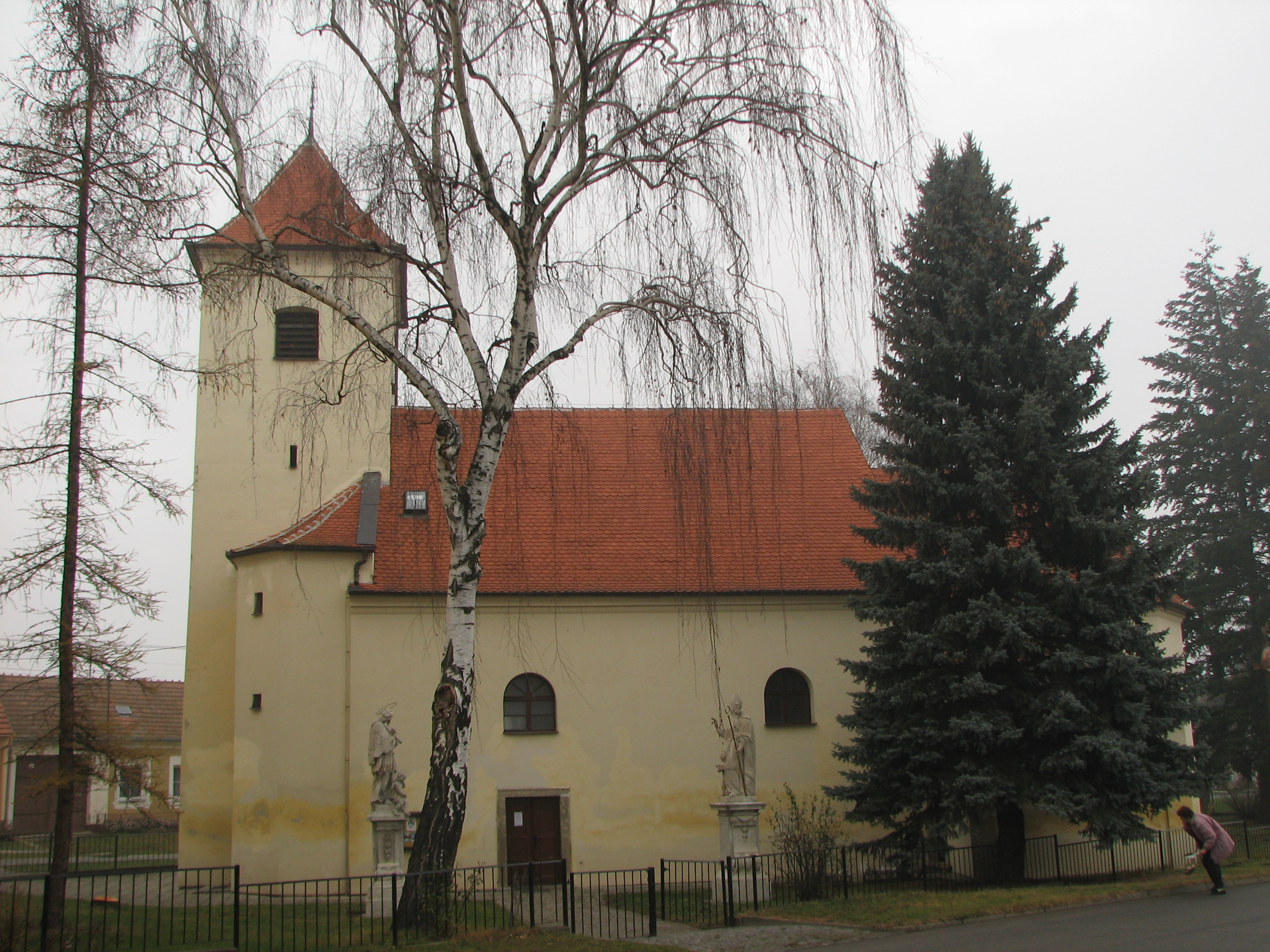
- Church of the Assumption of the Virgin Mary

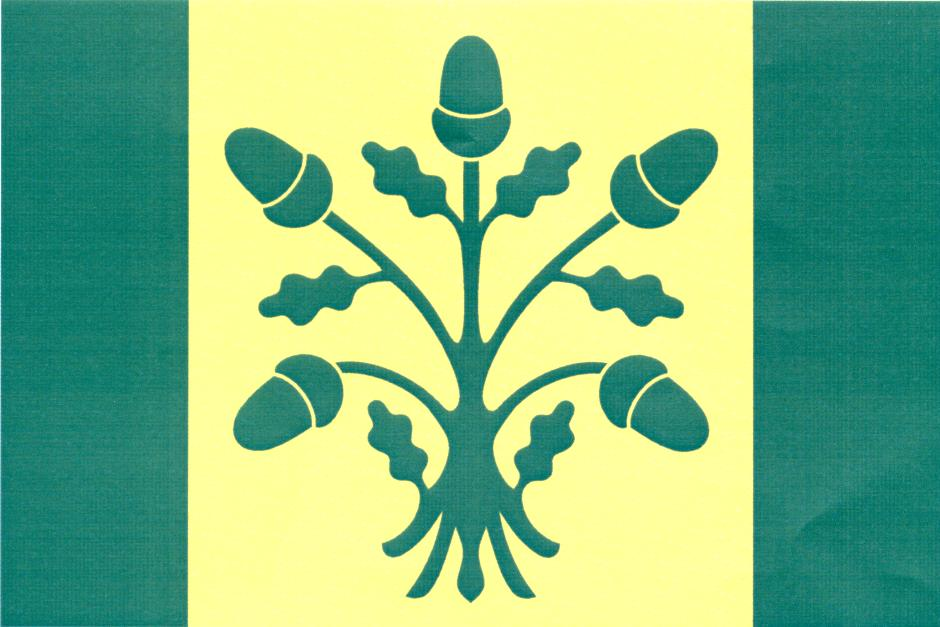
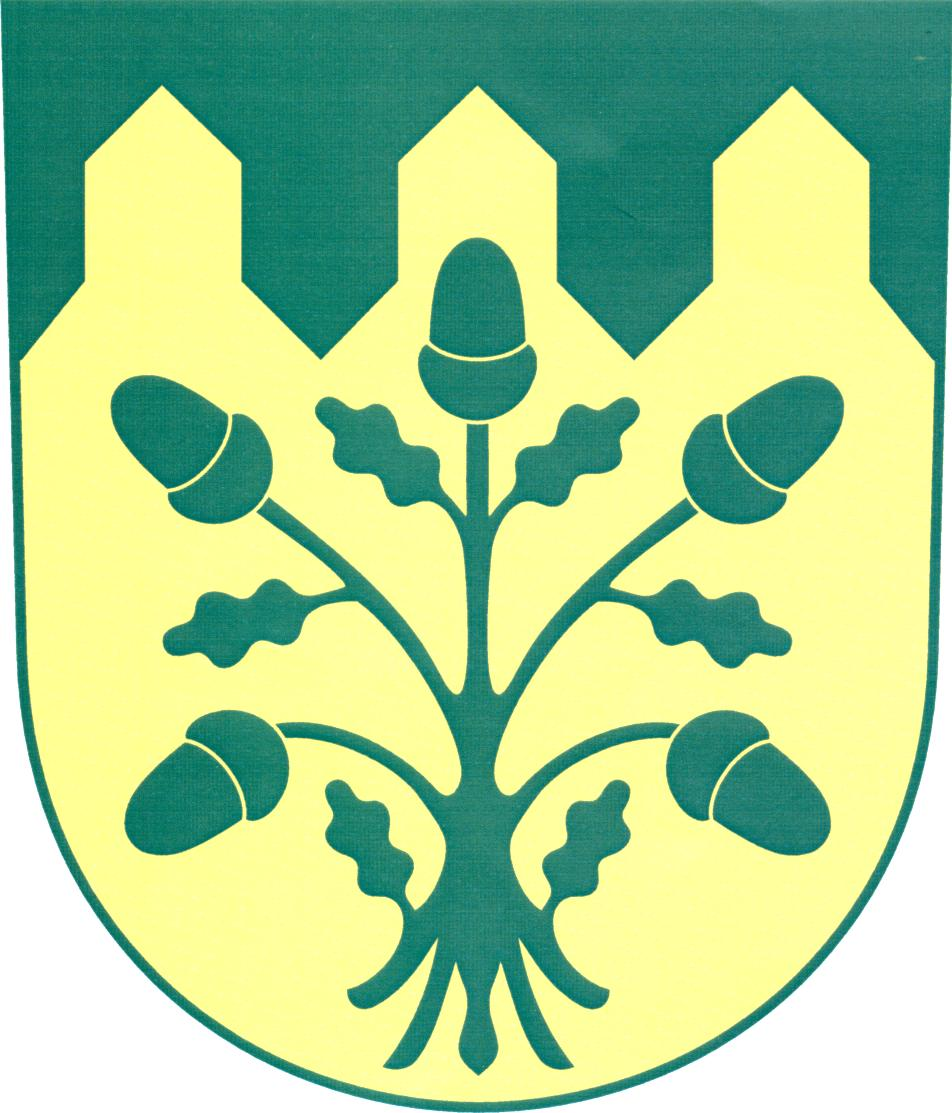
- Flag Coat of arms

- Location in the Czech Republic
- Coordinates: 48°48′59″N 17°3′4″E
- Country: Czech Republic
- Region: South Moravian
- District: Hodonín
- First mentioned: 1141

Area
  - Total: 15.30 km^{2} (5.91 sq mi)
- Elevation: 165 m (541 ft)

Population (2026-01-01)
  - Total: 1,968
  - Density: 128.6/km^{2} (333.1/sq mi)
- Time zone: UTC+1 (CET)
  - Summer (DST): UTC+2 (CEST)
- Postal code: 696 19
- Website: www.mikulcice.cz

Mikulčice (Czech pronunciation: [ˈmɪkultʃitsɛ]) is a municipality and village in Hodonín District in the South Moravian Region of the Czech Republic. It has about 2,000 inhabitants. The municipality is located on the Kyjovka River in the Lower Morava Valley.

Mikulčice is known for the Mikulčice-Valy archaeological site, which is protected as a national cultural monument.

== Administrative division ==
Mikulčice consists of two municipal parts (in brackets population according to the 2021 census):

- Mikulčice (974)
- Těšice (921)

== Geography ==
Mikulčice is located about 6 kilometres (4 mi) southwest of Hodonín and 52 km (32 mi) southeast of Brno, on the border with Slovakia. It lies in a flat landscape in the Lower Morava Valley. The municipality is crossed by the Kyjovka River. The Czech–Slovak border is formed here by the Morava River.

== History ==
From the 6th until the 10th century, a Slavic fortified settlement existed 3 km southeast from the modern village on the site called Mikulčice-Valy. The settlement was one of the main centres of the Great Moravian Empire, plausibly its capital city. Excavations unearthed the remnants of twelve churches, a palace, and more than 2,500 graves (including a horse burial).

The first written mention of Mikulčice is from 1141. The Church of the Assumption of the Virgin Mary was first mentioned in 1353. At the beginning of the 15th century, a fortress stood here. The fortress was probably destroyed during the Hussite Wars.

Mikulčice was heavily damaged by the 2021 South Moravia tornado.

== Demographics ==
Historical population

| Year | Pop. | ±% |
|---|---|---|
| 1869 | 1,574 | — |
| 1880 | 1,805 | +14.7% |
| 1890 | 1,915 | +6.1% |
| 1900 | 2,022 | +5.6% |
| 1910 | 2,004 | −0.9% |

| Year | Pop. | ±% |
|---|---|---|
| 1921 | 1,980 | −1.2% |
| 1930 | 1,981 | +0.1% |
| 1950 | 1,924 | −2.9% |
| 1961 | 2,011 | +4.5% |
| 1970 | 1,898 | −5.6% |

| Year | Pop. | ±% |
|---|---|---|
| 1980 | 1,737 | −8.5% |
| 1991 | 1,751 | +0.8% |
| 2001 | 1,906 | +8.9% |
| 2011 | 1,881 | −1.3% |
| 2021 | 1,895 | +0.7% |

Source: Censuses

== Economy ==
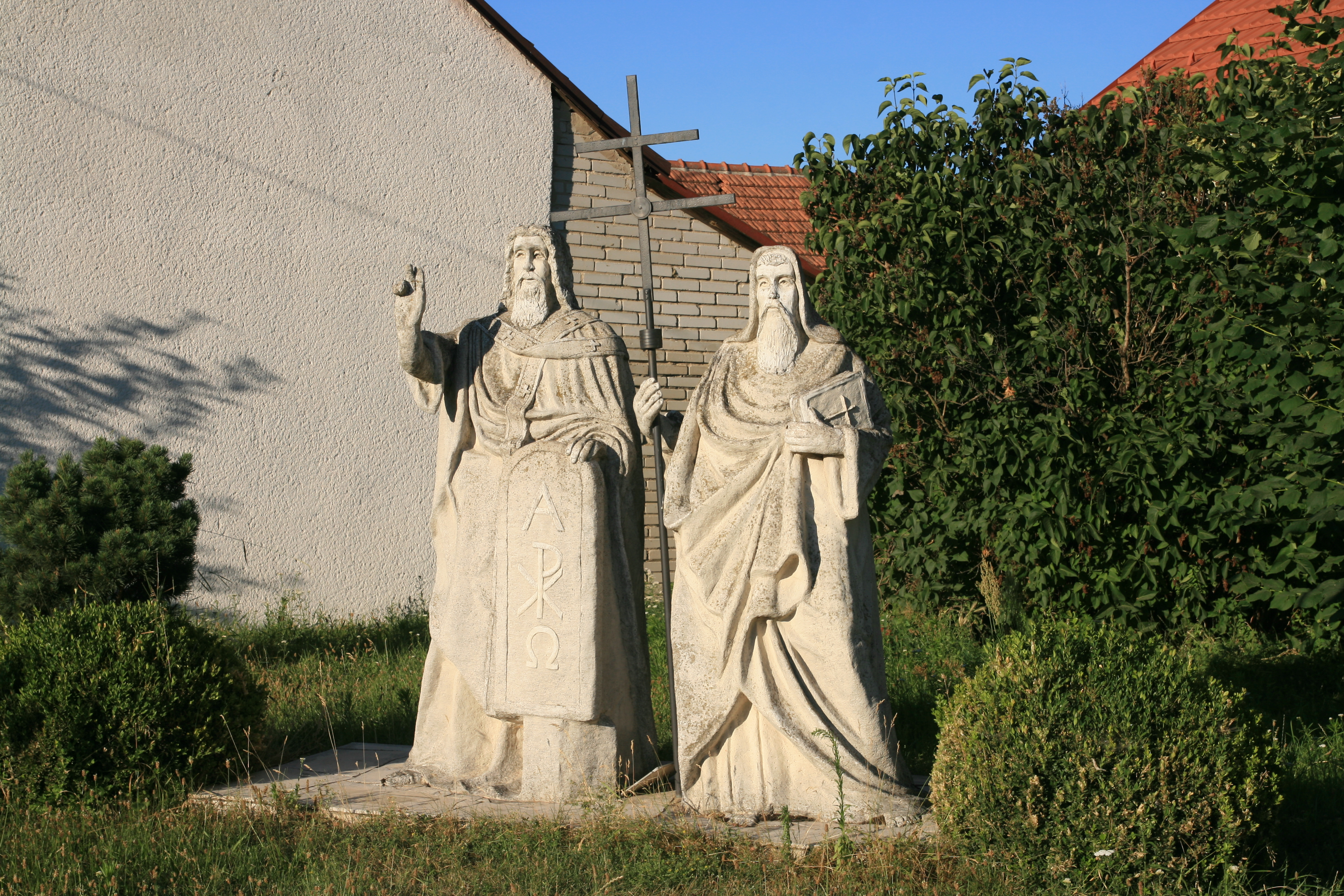
Saints Cyril and Methodius monument

The local economy is predominantly based on agriculture and tourism.

== Transport ==
The I/55 road (the section from Břeclav to Hodonín) runs through the municipal territory.

The railway line Přerov–Břeclav runs through Mikulčice, but there is no train station. The municipality is served by the station in neighbouring Lužice.

== Sights ==
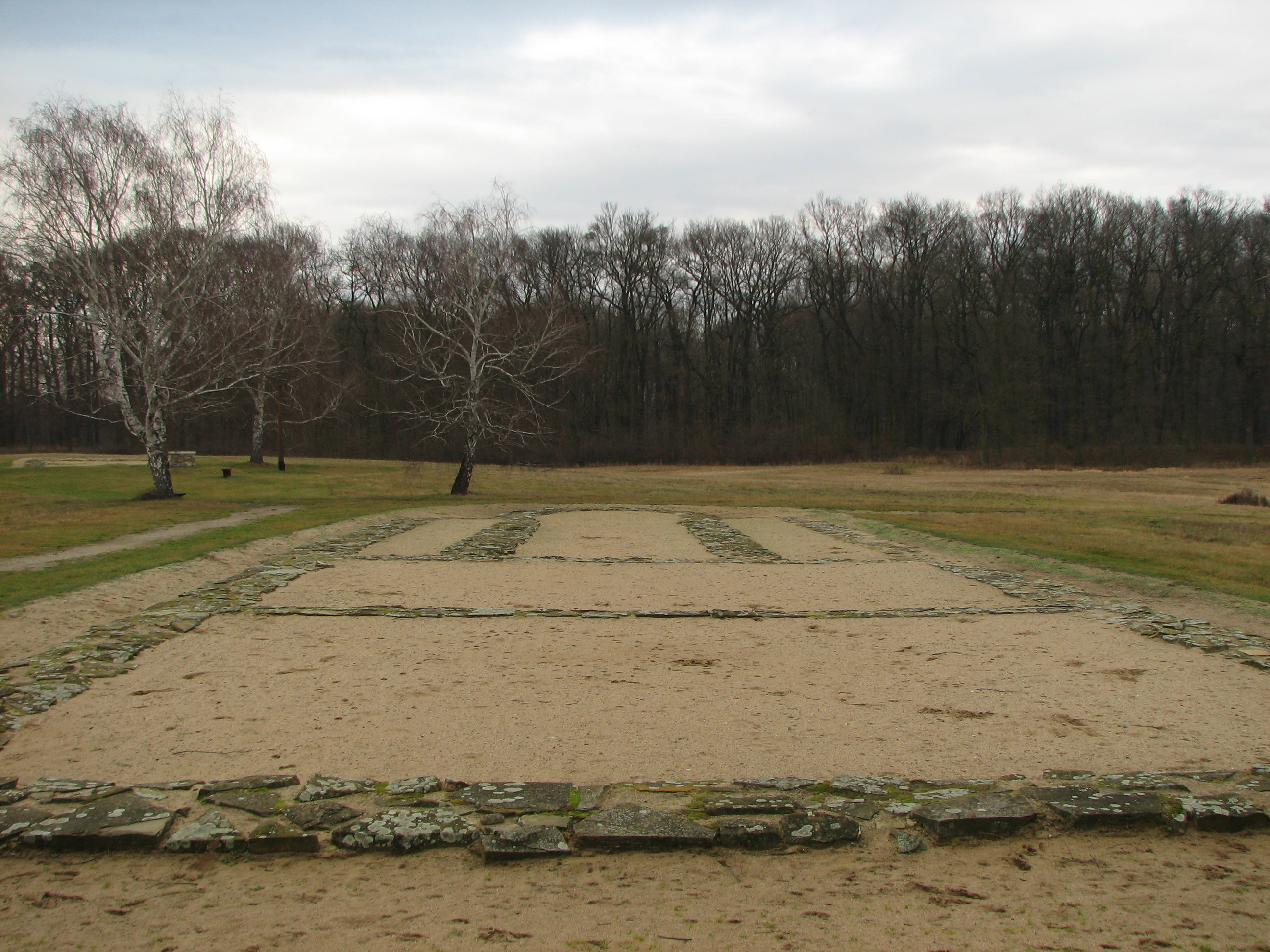
The foundations of a 9th-century church in Mikulčice-Valy

The main landmark of Mikulčice is the Church of the Assumption of the Virgin Mary. The original Gothic building from the mid-14th century was replaced by the current structure around 1500. In 1605 and 1683, the church burned down and was reconstructed. In the 1730s, it was rebuilt in the Baroque style, but the Gothic core has been preserved.

The Mikulčice-Valy site is the main tourist attraction. It is freely accessible. It includes an exhibition with archaeological finds from this area, administered by the Masaryk Museum in Hodonín. Since 1962, the site has been protected as a national cultural monument.

== Notable people ==
- Miloslav Balun (1920–1994), pair skater
