= Těšice (Mikulčice) =

- Municipal part
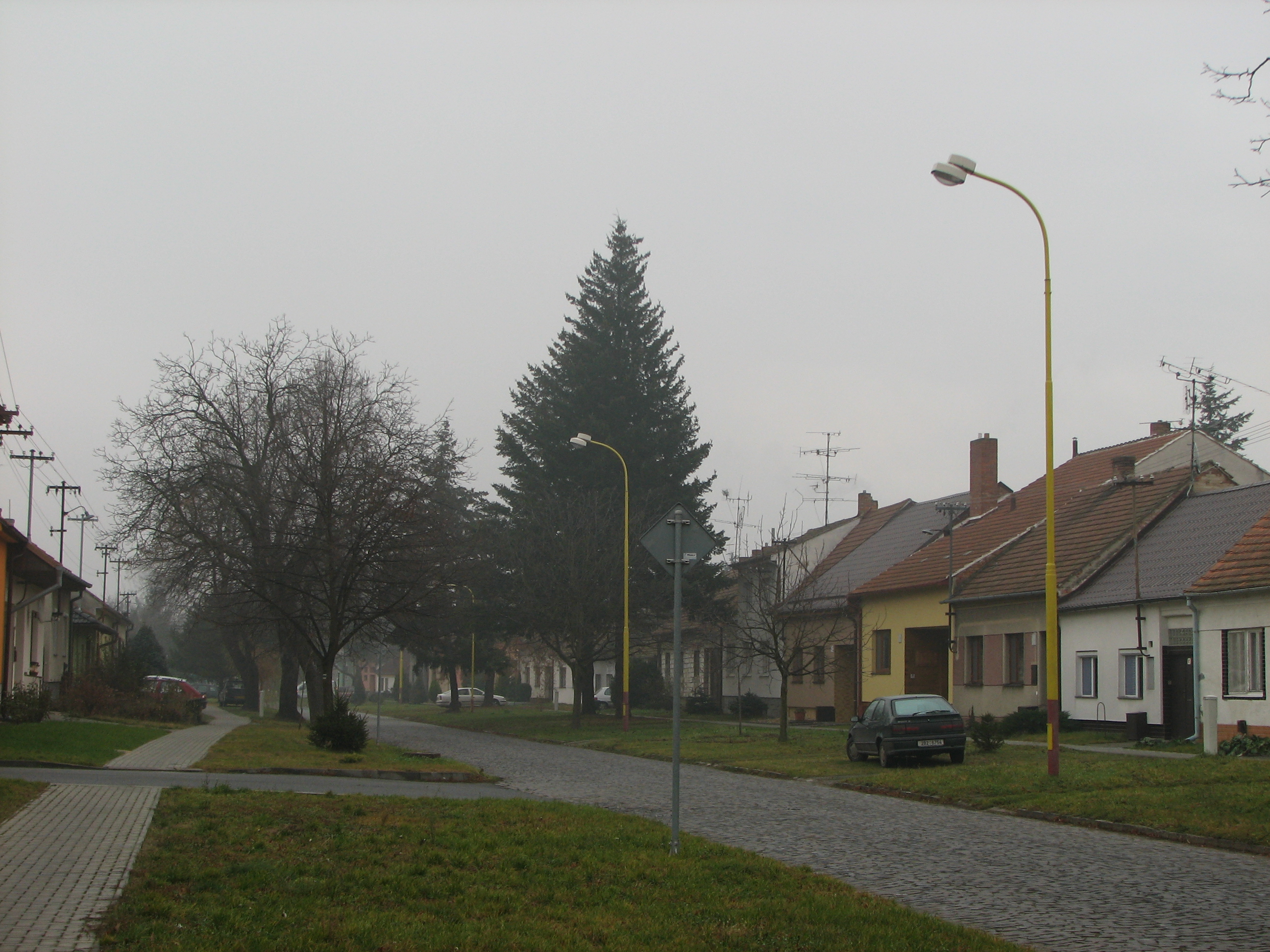
- Street in Těšice
- Interactive map of Těšice
- Country: Czech Republic
- Region: South Moravian Region
- District: Hodonín
- Municipality: Mikulčice

Area
  - Total: 3.06 km^{2} (1.18 sq mi)

Population (2021)
  - Total: 921
  - Density: 301/km^{2} (780/sq mi)
- Time zone: UTC+1 (CET)
  - Summer (DST): UTC+2 (CEST)
- Postal code: 696 19

Těšice is a village and municipal part of Mikulčice in Hodonín District of the South Moravian Region of the Czech Republic. It has 921 inhabitants as of the 2021 census.

== History ==
The first written mention of Těšice dates back to 1302.

Těšice was originally located in its own cadastral area,which was incorporated into the Mikulčice cadastral area in 1980.

Formerly a municipality, it became part of Mikulčice in 1950.

== Demographics ==
Historical population

Year	Pop.	±%
1869	589	—
1880	694	+17.8%
1890	773	+11.4%
1900	792	+2.5%
1910	793	+0.1%
1921	830	+4.7%
1930	832	+0.2%
1950	826	−0.7%

Year	Pop.	±%
1961	909	+10.0%
1970	453	−50.2%
1980	844	+86.3%
1991	913	+8.2%
2001	988	+8.2%
2011	994	+0.6%
2021	921	−7.3%

Source: Censuses
