= Vaali =

Vaali may refer to:

- Vaali, Estonia, a village in Järva County, Estonia
- Vali (Ramayana), a character from the Ramayana
- Vaali (poet) (1931–2013), Indian Tamil-language poet and lyricist
- Vaalee (1999 film), a 1999 Indian Tamil film directed by S. J. Suryah, starring Ajith
- Vaalee (2001 film), a 2001 Indian Kannada film directed by S. Mahendar, starring Sudeep

== See also ==
- Vali (disambiguation)
