= Vali =

Vali or Wali can refer to:

== Places ==
- Vali, Iran, a village in Khuzestan Province, Iran
- Vali, East Azerbaijan, a village in East Azerbaijan Province, Iran

== People ==
- Wali, title meaning governor in Arabic and several other languages
- The Vali tribe, a Sarmatian tribe of Ptolemy

=== Mythological characters ===
- Váli, In Norse mythology, a son of Odin and Rind
- Váli (son of Loki), a son of Loki in some versions of Norse mythology
- Vali (Ramayana) or Bali, character in the Hindu epic Ramayana
- Al-Walee, one of the Names of God in the Qur'an

=== Persons ===
- Abbas Vali (born 1949), Iranian Kurdish academic
- Ali Khan Vali (1845/46–1902), Iranian photographer and governor
- Amir Vali (fl. 1356–1384), ruler of Astarabad and parts of Mazandaran
- Ayub Vali (born 1987), Iranian footballer
- Carmen L. Vali (born 1965), American politician, mayor of Aliso Viejo, California
- Ekke Väli (born 1952), Estonian sculptor
- Ferenc A. Váli (1905–1984), Hungarian-born lawyer, author and political analyst
- Hugo Väli (1902–1943), Estonian footballer
- Mastan Vali, Indian politician from Guntur West, Andhra Pradesh
- Moses David Vali (circa 1697–1776), Jewish biblical commentator, physician, scholar, and Kabbalist
- Nathar Vali (died 1069), Iranian Sufi saint of India
- Neeme Väli (born 1965), Estonian Major General of the Estonian Defence League
- Pourya-ye Vali (died 1322), Iranian Sufi and champion
- Rajka Vali (1924–2011), Croatian pop music singer
- Reza Vali (born 1952), Iranian musician and composer
- Shah Nematollah Vali (1330–1431), Sufi master and poet
- Tawakkal Mastan Vali (17th century), Indian Sufi saint
- Voldemar Väli (1903–1997), Estonian Greco-Roman wrestler
- Vaali (poet) (1931–2013), Indian poet and lyricist in Tamil

== Film ==
- Vali (film) or The Governor, a 2009 Turkish action film directed by M. Çağatay Tosun
- Vaalee (1999 film), an Indian Tamil-language action film by S. J. Surya, starring Ajith Kumar

== Medical ==
- ventilator-associated lung injury
- Vaping-associated lung injury, an acute lung injury due to certain vaping products

== See also ==
- Wali (disambiguation)
- Valis (disambiguation)
- Valli (disambiguation)
- Vaali (disambiguation)
- Bali (disambiguation)
