= Val (Rychnov nad Kněžnou District) =

- Municipality
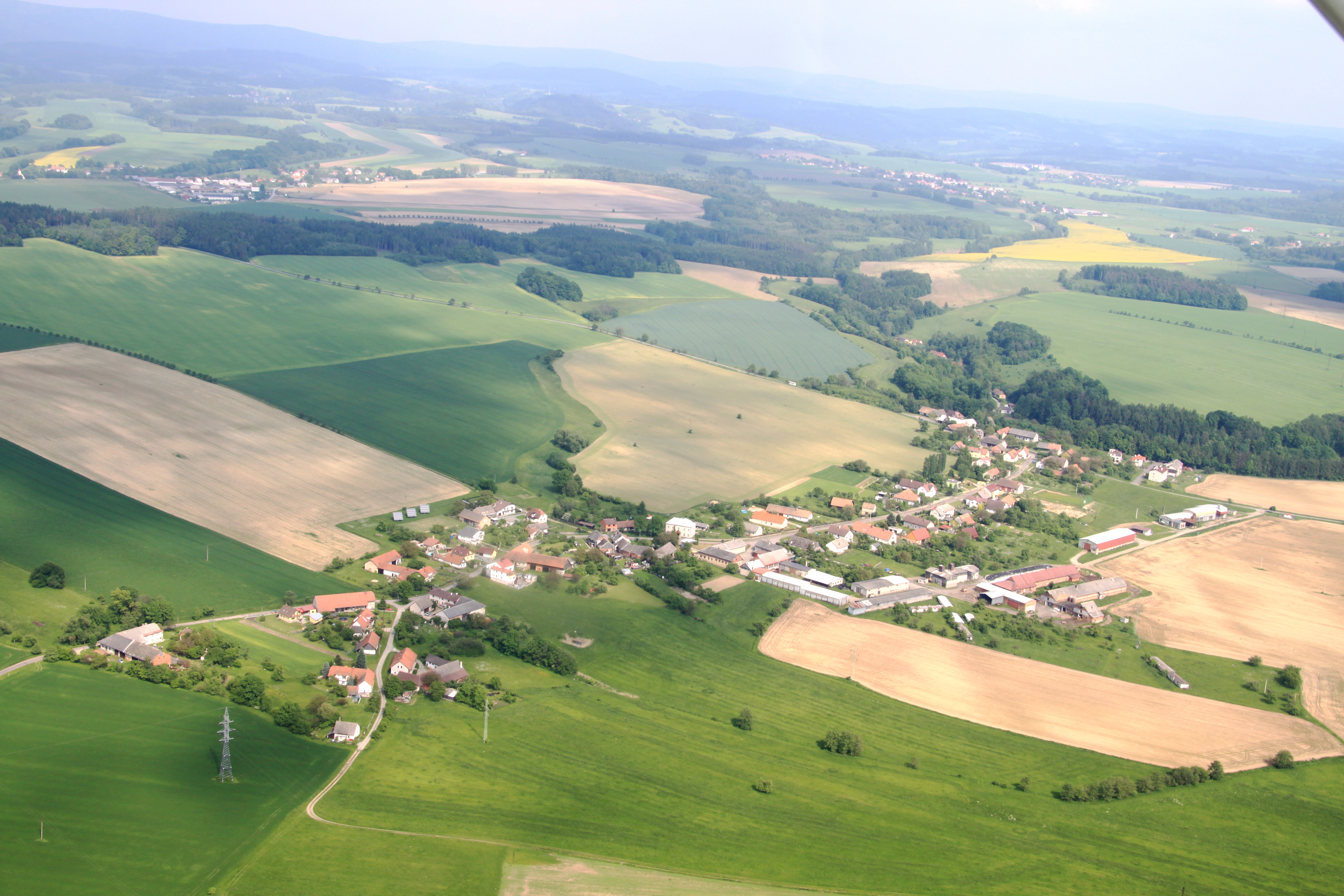
- Aerial view

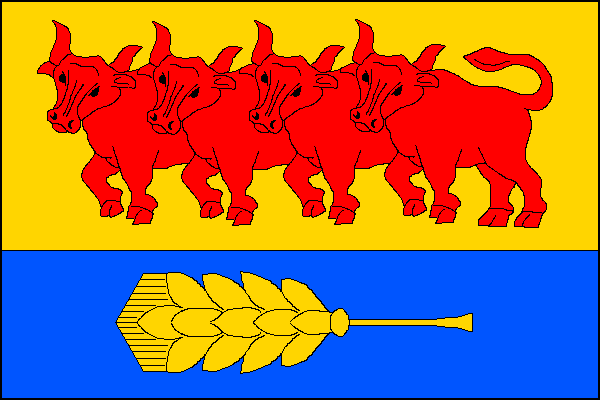
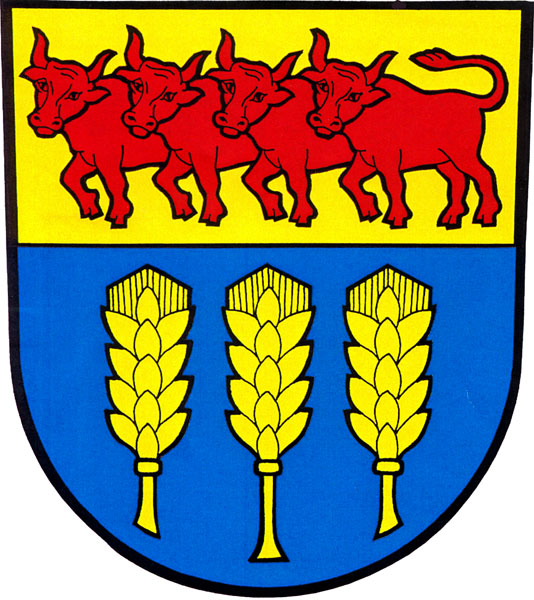
- Flag Coat of arms

- Location in the Czech Republic
- Coordinates: 50°18′40″N 16°10′52″E
- Country: Czech Republic
- Region: Hradec Králové
- District: Rychnov nad Kněžnou
- First mentioned: 1361

Area
  - Total: 6.05 km^{2} (2.34 sq mi)
- Elevation: 355 m (1,165 ft)

Population (2026-01-01)
  - Total: 317
  - Density: 52.4/km^{2} (136/sq mi)
- Time zone: UTC+1 (CET)
  - Summer (DST): UTC+2 (CEST)
- Postal code: 518 01
- Website: www.val.cz

Val (German: Wall) is a municipality and village in Rychnov nad Kněžnou District in the Hradec Králové Region of the Czech Republic. It has about 300 inhabitants.

== Administrative division ==
Val consists of two municipal parts (in brackets population according to the 2021 census):

- Val (220)
- Provoz (80)

== Geography ==
Val is located about 26 kilometres (16 mi) northeast of Hradec Králové. It lies mostly in the Orlické Foothills, only a small part of the municipal territory in the west lies in the Orlice Table. The highest point is the hill Rosošky at 429 m (1,407 ft) above sea level.

== Demographics ==
Historical population
Year	Pop.	±%
1869	587	—
1880	575	−2.0%
1890	588	+2.3%
1900	543	−7.7%
1910	522	−3.9%
1921	503	−3.6%
1930	445	−11.5%
1950	332	−25.4%
1961	334	+0.6%
1970	313	−6.3%
1980	312	−0.3%
1991	273	−12.5%
2001	287	+5.1%
2011	300	+4.5%
2021	300	+0.0%
Source: Censuses
