= Mikulčice-Valy =

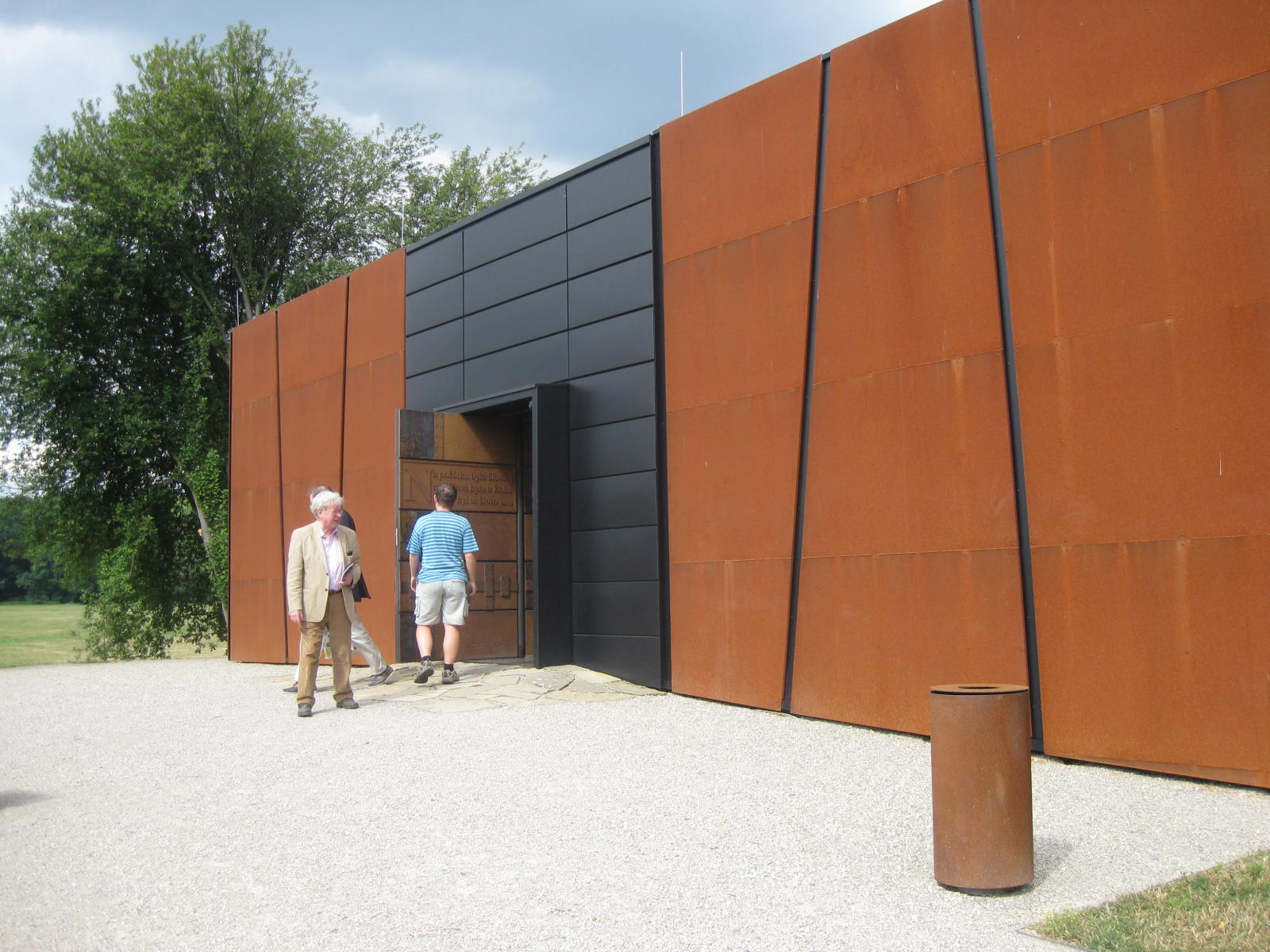
- Exhibition pavilion built over the 2nd church

- Location within Czech Republic

General information
- Type: Museum and Archaeological Park
- Architectural style: Fortified settlement of the Great Moravian Empire
- Location: Mikulčice, South Moravian Region, Czech Republic
- Coordinates: 48°48′15″N 17°5′12″E

Website
- www.masaryk.info

Mikulčice-Valy is an archaeological site and a museum with remains of a significant Slavic gord from the times of the Great Moravian Empire. The site is located in Mikulčice in the South Moravian Region of the Czech Republic, near the river Morava, which forms the Czech–Slovak boundary.

The Archaeopark is a branch of the Masaryk Museum in Hodonín and an archaeological research institute of Czech Academy of Sciences in Brno is also on the site. The Mikulčice-Valy site is being considered by UNESCO for designation as a World Heritage Site.

== Description ==
The site of the Acropolis would have been a low-lying island in the Morava, which has now been canalised. The Acropolis was surrounded by a stone faced rampart, which would have been reached by a wooded bridge from the outer bailey. The ramparts of the Acropolis enclosed an area of about 6 hectares. There are further extramural settlements surrounding the site. Settlement started possibly in the 8th century AD and continued until the demise of the Great Moravia Empire into the early part 10th century.)The excavations started 1955 and have progressed, almost continuously, until the present time.

== History of the excavations and research ==
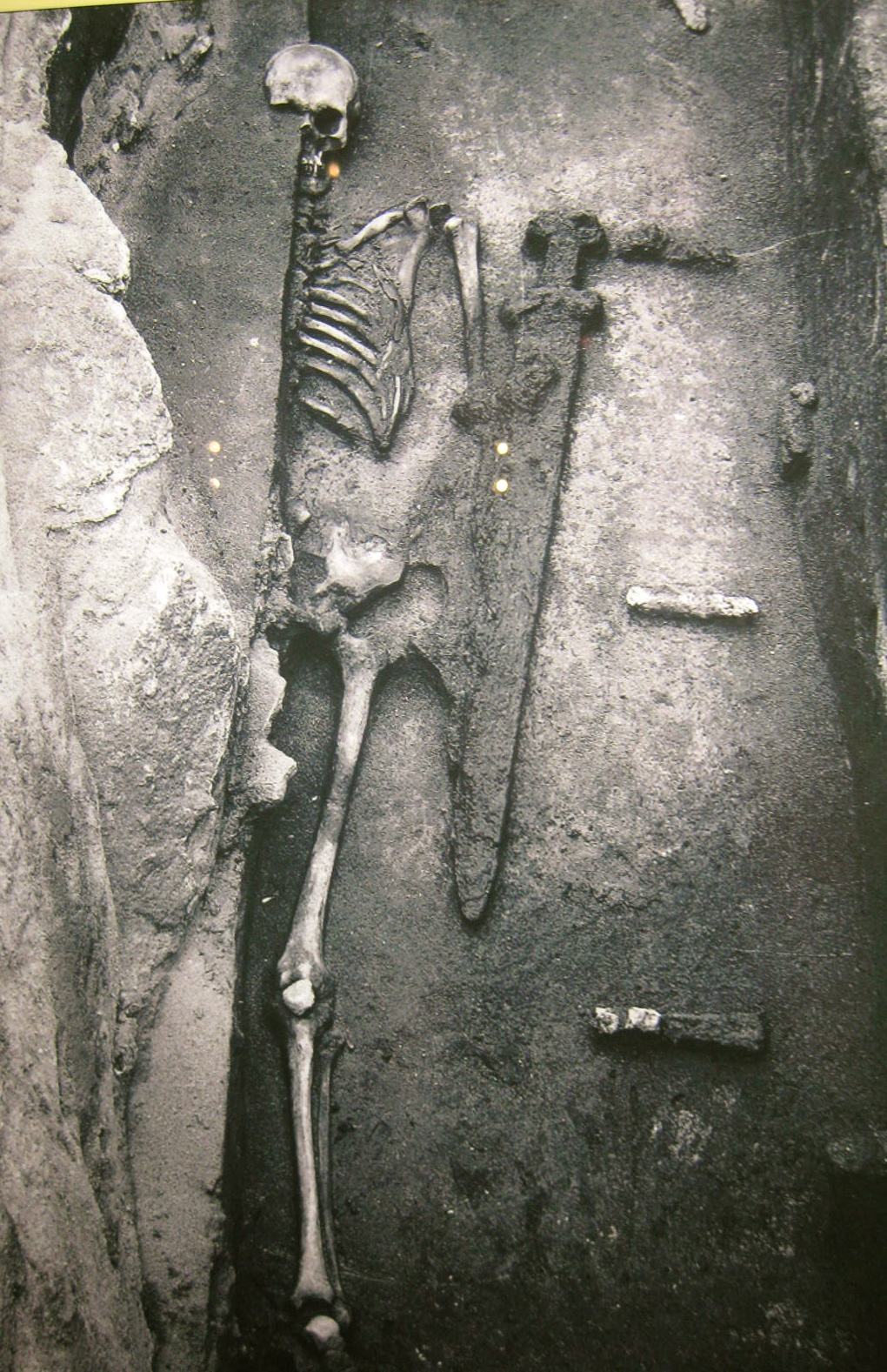
Skeleton with Avar-type iron sword

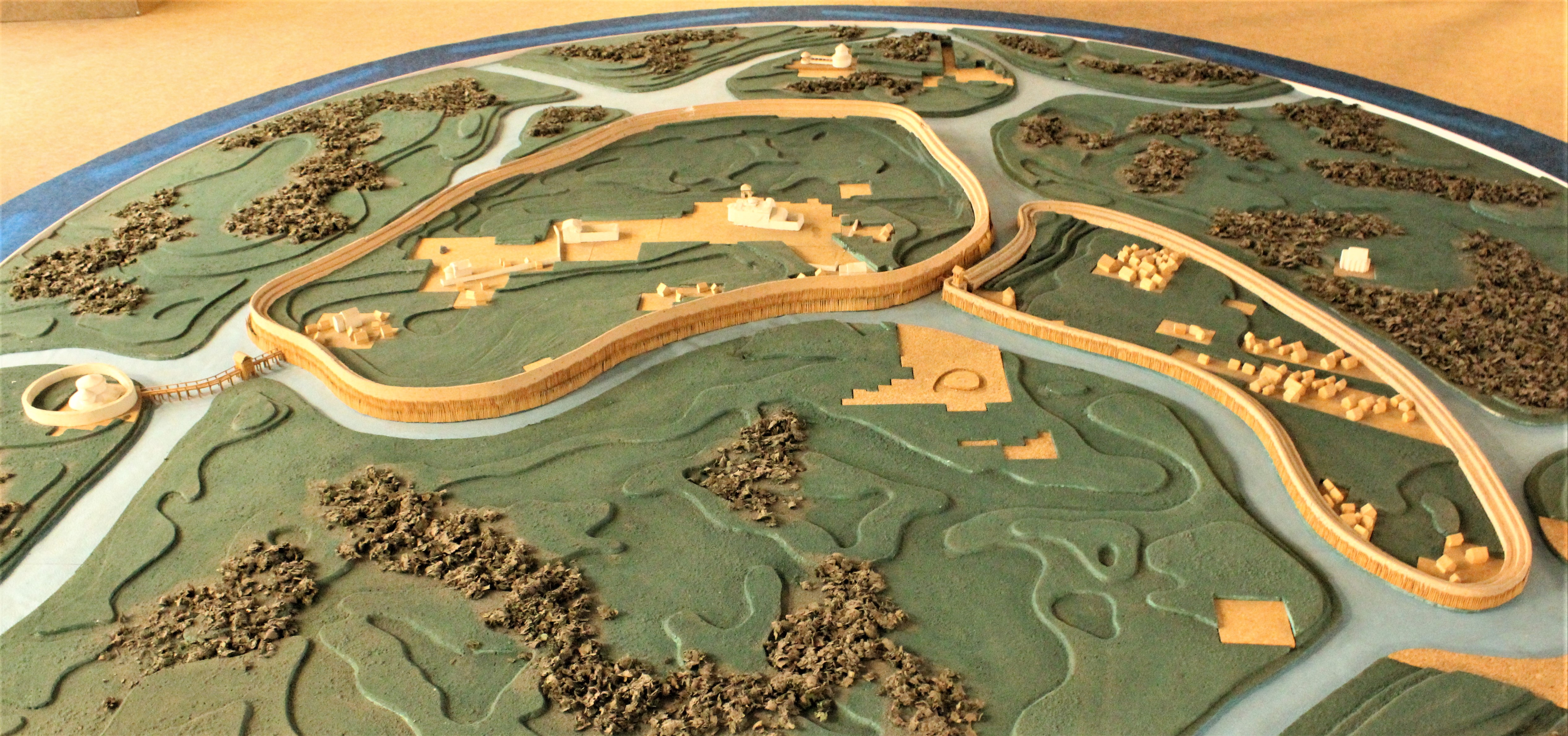
Mikulčice, hillfort maquette

The first archaeological investigation of this site was conducted by prof. Karel Jaromír Maška in 1888, however back then the site was wrongly dated to the 11th or 12th century. In 1950s the plans to introduce deep plowing by the local state farm endangered the site and locals, hoping to have the site recorded, invited Josef Poulík to conduct an archaeological excavation, during which he discovered the second church in the curve of the rampart close to the western entrance of the acropolis and correctly dated the site to the 9th century. The church was surrounded by a cemetery of about 200 graves, including three burials with swords (nos 90, 265 and 280) and rich grave goods in other burials including spurs, buttons and earrings and elaborately ornamented belt fitting. Excavations of the adjacent ramparts showed that they were built in two phases. To the East another stone building was found, originally thought to be a church, but this interpretation is not now accepted. In 2011 the 1950s Exhibition Pavilion which incorporates the foundations of Church 2 was reconstructed and reopened to the public, the visitors centre being rebuild in 2015.

=== The 3rd basilica church ===
In 1957 excavations moved to the 3rd or basilica church. This doubled aisled church with an eastern apse and western atrium and narthex, is by far the largest church to have been found at Mikulčice. It may have served as a cathedral. It was surrounded by a graveyard of about 550 burials, some of which were very rich and included five burials with swords (nos 341, 375, 425, 438, 500 and 580). 580 was a particularly rich burial, placed in the Nave of the church, and is likely to have been a member of the ruling elite. It contained a sword, an axe, a dagger with decorated hilt, a bucket, belt fittings and a golden button. The body had been placed in a coffin made from forged iron panels.

=== The main secular building – "palace" ===
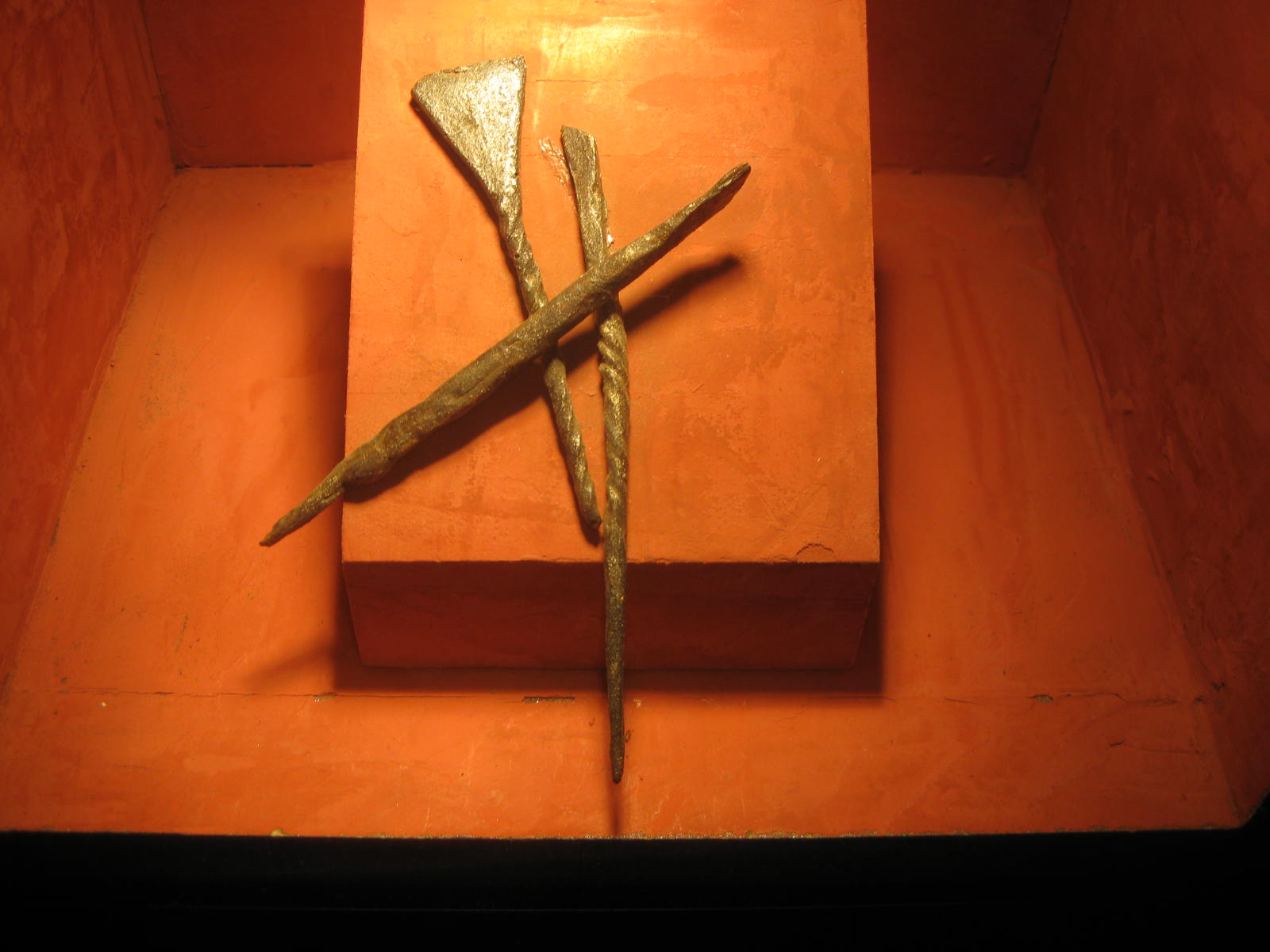
Mikulčice Iron Styli used for writing from the area of the Palace

In 1958 the excavations moved to a building, to the west of Church 3. The discovered archaeological evidence showed that the building served a secular purpouse and clearly used by the elites. This building most likely was used as either a "palace" or a "great meeting hall". The ground floor was built out of stone, which had been removed and only the rectangular outline was preserved by the robber trenches, like on the other structures of this site. The building was 26 m long and 10 m wide, with a hall at the west end and a smaller chamber at the east end. Some rich burials were found in the area and there was extensive evidence of metalworking including goldsmithing. There was some evidence of settlement that pre-dated the Great Moravian Empire including a hoard of clay animal figurines. A number of iron styli for writing on wax tablet were discovered, suggesting that the building would have been used for administrative purposes.

=== The 4th church ===
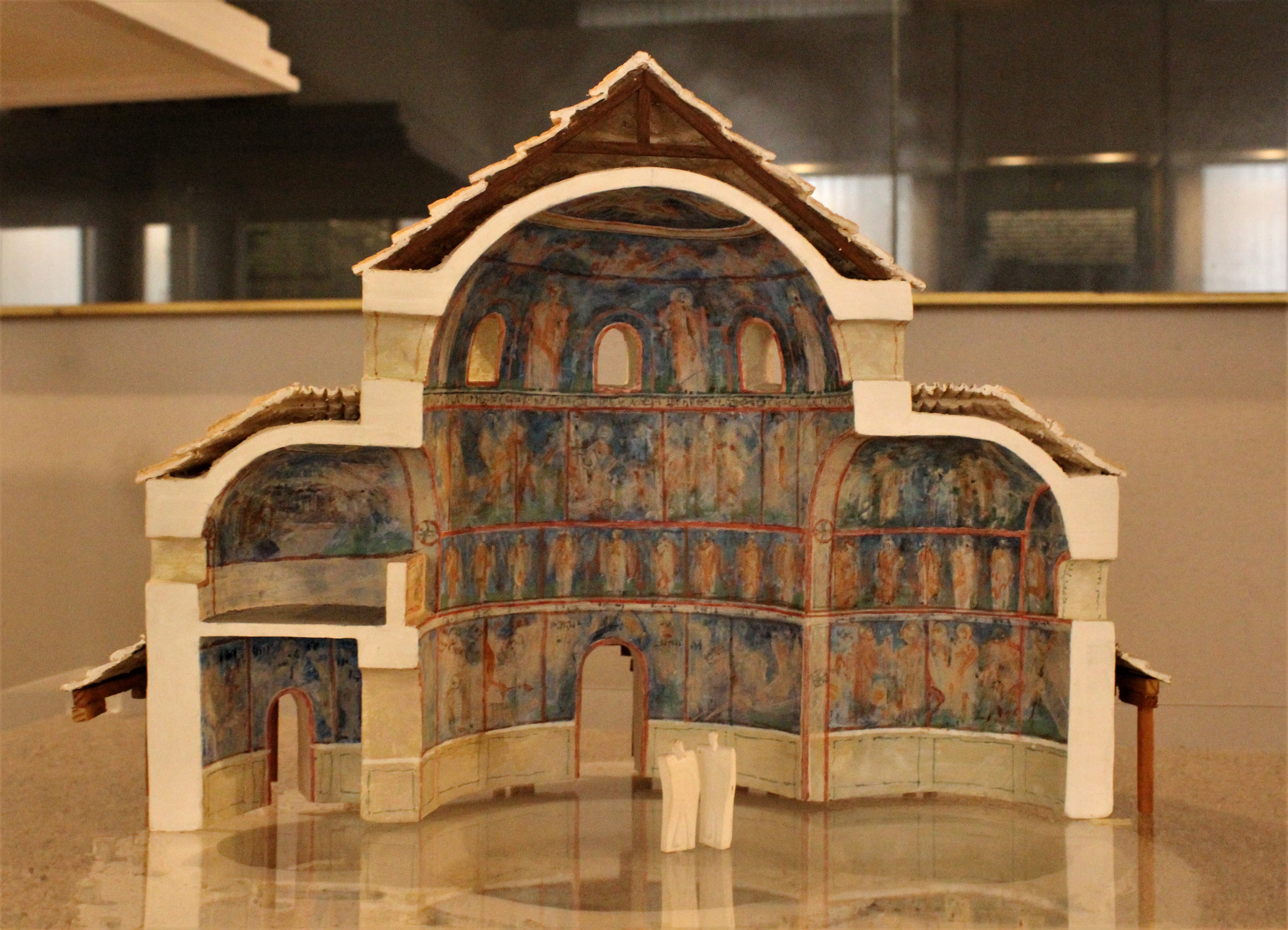
Mikulčice, double apsides rotunda

Also excavated in 1958 was the 4th church, which was almost rectangular with an apse. It was surrounded by about 100 burials. The graves were more poorly furnished, possibly reflecting Christianisation. In this cemetery there were more female burial than male. Close to this church was an assortment of building rubble previously associated to the now hypothetical 11th church in an area of a much richer cemetery. This included the burial (no. 821) of a six-year-old child with a cast bronze Avar horse head fitting, pottery vessels, a bucket and a bell.

=== The 5th church and a metal workshop ===
Excavation of the 5th church followed in 1959, together with a timber hall building with wattle and daub infill panels (this structure has been identified as potential metal/jewelry workshop which predated the church). The fifth church had a rectangular nave with an almost rectangular chancel. Adjacent to the church, which was next to a roadway leading to a gateway in the rampart, was a metalworking workshop producing high quality goods.

=== The 6th church and river deposits ===
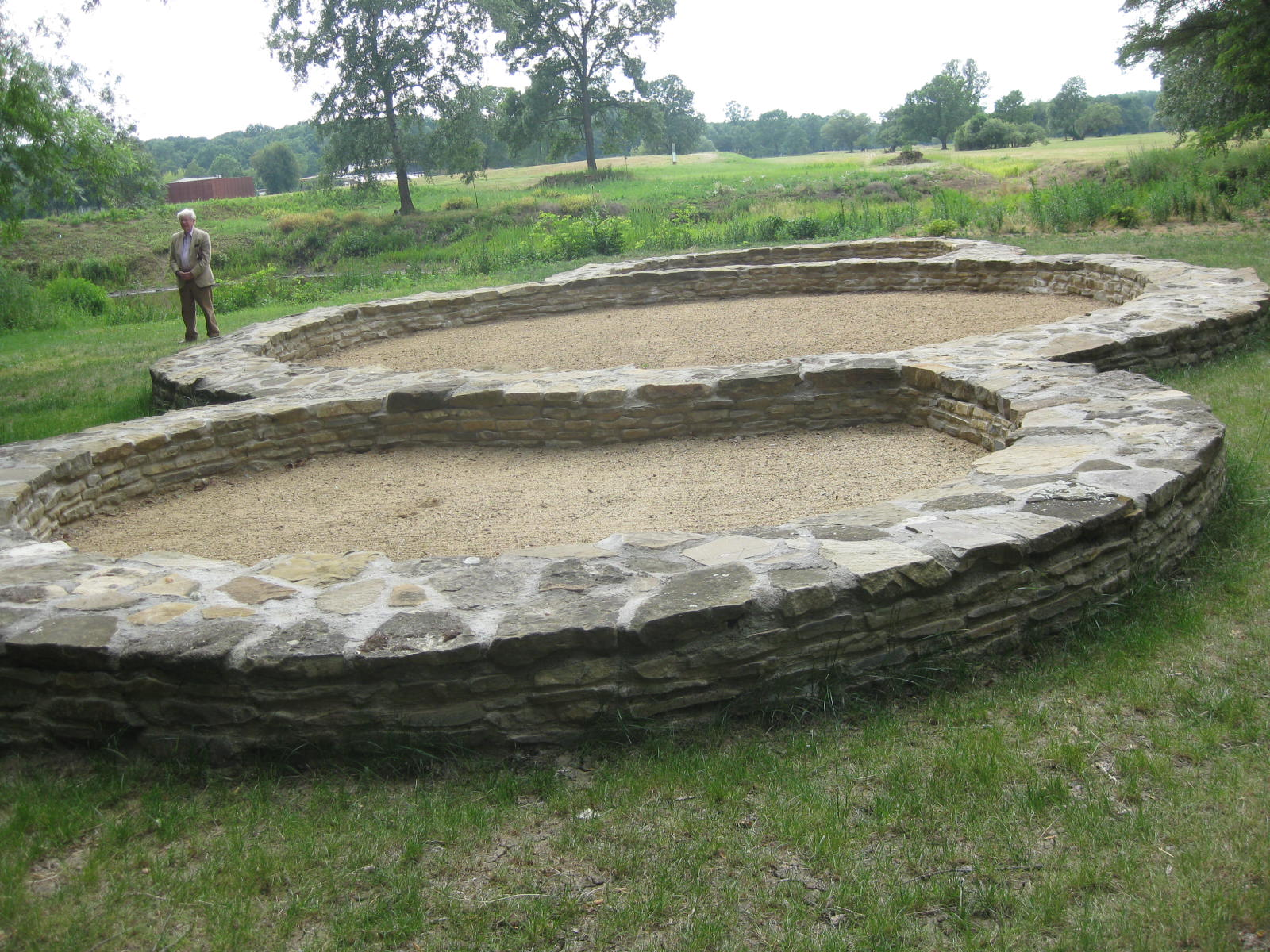
Mikulčice 6th, rotunda church with two semi-circular apses

In 1960 excavation moved to an extramural settlement outside the rampart, which had been reached over the river course by a wooded bridge. Extensive remains of wood were recovered including a logboat. Also discovered was a circular stone rotunda church with two semi-circular apses. Also in 1961 the 8th church was excavated, which had a rectangular nave and chancel. The graves of surrounding cemetery were relatively poorly furnished, but in the nave of the church was found a large hoard ironwork, including axes, ploughshares sickles and iron ingots. Also excavated was the bridge leading into the Outer bailey and the surrounding rampart. Finds from river-bed included another longboat, an archery bow, identified as being made from English yew, wicker fish-traps, ladles, spoons, buckets and vats.

=== Kostelisko Island and pre-Great Moravian finds in the outer bailey ===
In 1962, the extramural settlement, on a former island, known as Kostelisko, was excavated. The church was a round structure with four apses or niches set within the thickness of the walls of the rotunda. The church had survived into the 15th century, when it had been fortified during the Hussite wars. The cemetery associated with the church contained about 80 burials of the Great Moravian period, but also early medieval burials. The Moravian burials were very rich and contained a number of warrior burials with iron axes and spurs. In 1963–4 Excavation moved to investigating the interior of the Outer bailey and also church no 10, which was outside the ramparts and over the other side of the former river. In the outer bailey there were numerous wooden dwellings and a number of these building had rich graves cut through their floors. Below this level on the bedrock there was an ashy layer with Avar cast metalwork, suggesting an 8th-century settlement that predated the Great Moravian Empire.

=== Second and third phases of excavation programme ===
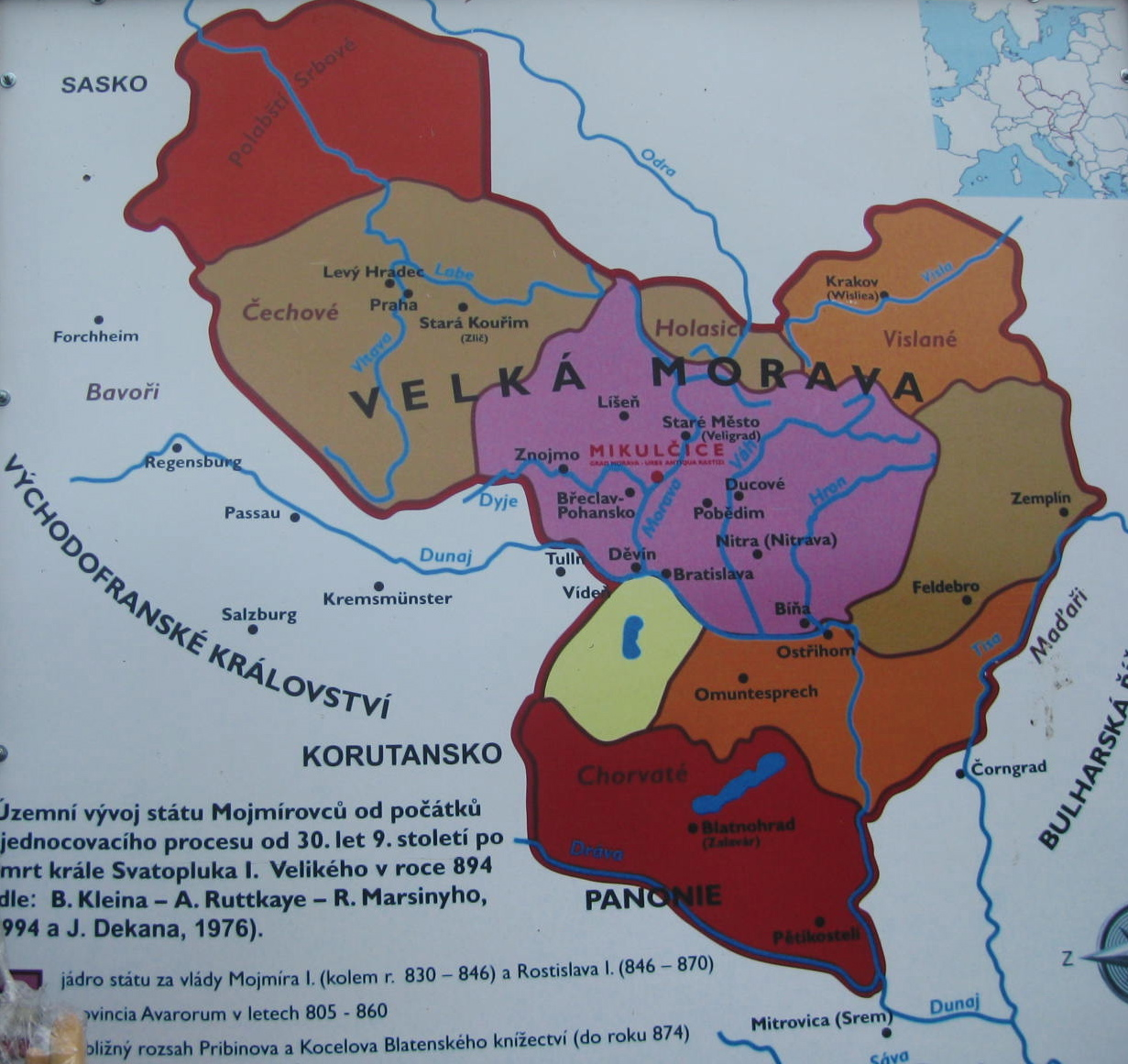
Map showing Mikulčice at the centre of the Great Moravian Empire

From 1964 to 1974 the second phase of excavation explored the outer bailey and oxbow lakes with preserved woodwork and bridges. This was followed by the third phase from 1975 to 1990, which concentrated on area excavation within the ramparts of the acropolis which ended previous work. Also between 1984 and 1990 the Kostelisko cemetery was excavated to the west of the 9th church. This contained approximately 415 graves which were accompanied by rich grave goods. In 1990 the yearly excavations were suspended. In 1993 a series of limited excavations, mainly to confirm the stratigraphy on the main sites were started. Also the Research Institute of the Czech Academy of Sciences started rescue excavations in the vicinity of Mikulčice. These include the Panské Cemetery, excavated in 1999–2000, when the railway to Prerov was widened. This cemetery revealed 128 burials from the 9th to the 11th centuries.

=== The stone churches ===
The stone used for the building of the church would have been quarried from the White Carpathian Mountains and brought a distance of about 8 kilometres. The churches were rendered on the outside and plastered internally. There is evidence for wall painting, which appears to have been mainly geometric designs in the 4th and 6th churches. The lack of evidence for roofing materials, makes it likely that the roofs were covered with split wooden tiles or shingles.

The churches discovered at Mikulčice belong to the general tradition of Pre-Romanesque church architecture but the design and layout can be seen as being derived from various areas of Europe; from Byzantine architecture, Italian architecture, Germanic and Anglo-Saxon and Celtic of the British Isles. This mixture of styles is not surprising. Initially the bishop of Passau was charged with the Christian mission in mission in the area north of the Danube in the 8th century. In this he was assisted by Hiberno-Scottish Monks. The first Moravian ruler known by name, Mojmir I of Moravia, was baptised in 831 by Reginhar, bishop of Passau Mojmir was deposed by Rastislav in 846; as Mojmir was aligned with the Germans and the Catholic Church, Rastislav asked for support from the Byzantine Empire and aligned himself with the Eastern Orthodox Church. This was followed in 863 by the mission of Cyril and Methodius and for the remainder of the century there was a power struggle over the Christianization of Moravia. This is clearly reflected in the church architecture at Mikulčice.

=== The cemeteries and grave goods ===
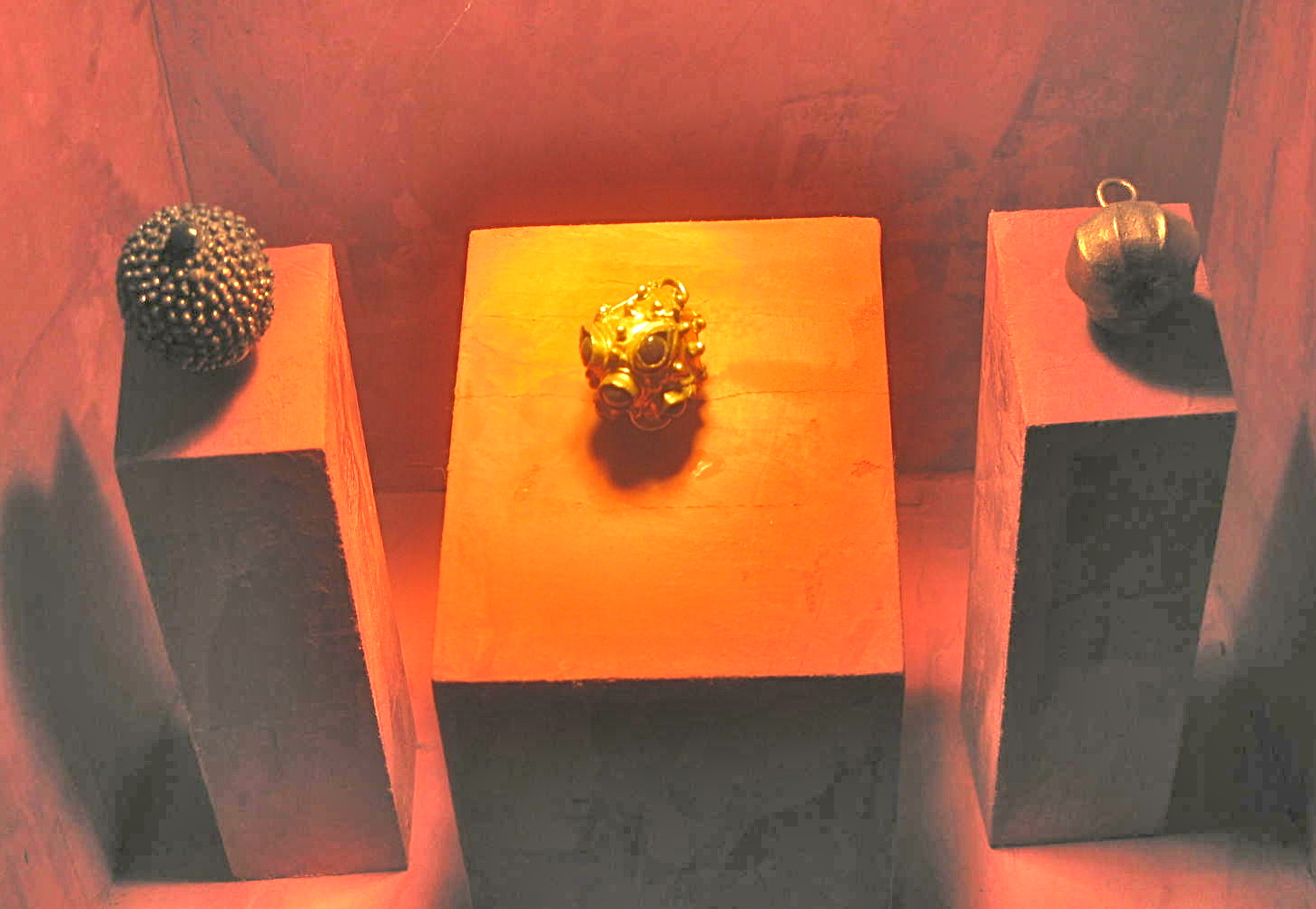
Mikulčice Globular buttons or gombik

Over 2,600 inhumation burials, mainly in cemeteries of the Great Moravian period, have now been found at Mikulčice. The largest and richest of these cemeteries were those associated with the Basilica church (no. 3) and the Kostelisko site. The detailed study of the chronology and typology of grave goods is yet to be completed. A degree of social stratigraphy can be distinguished in the with the élite warrior burials who are accompanied by their swords and the horse-men who are equipped with gilded bronze spurs and battle axes.

Very typical of Great Moravian metalworking is the hollow globular metal buttons or gombik that were used, often in pairs, to hold a cloak or garment around the neck, They occur with both male and female burials and were almost certainly made in local workshops.

== Gallery ==
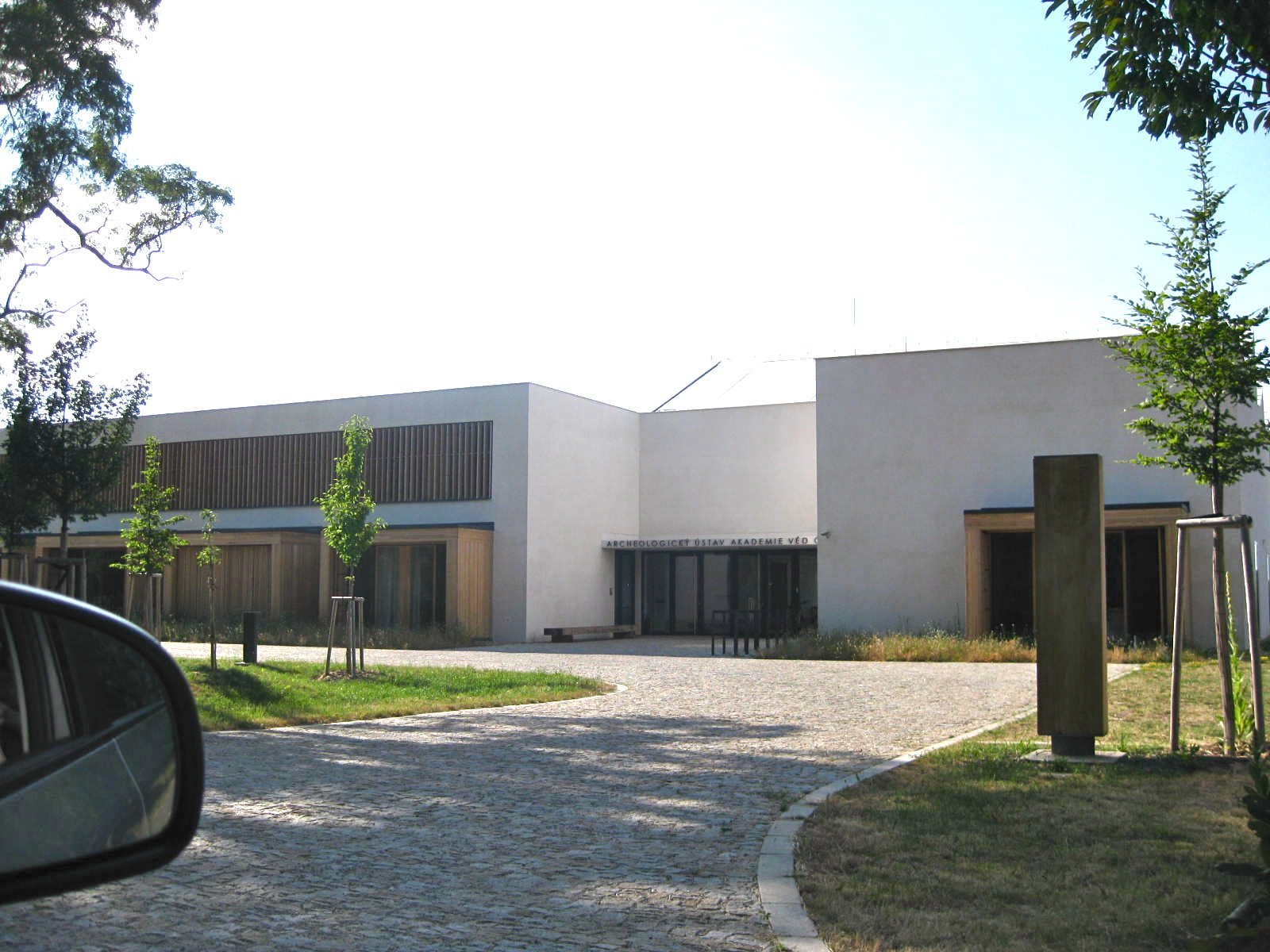

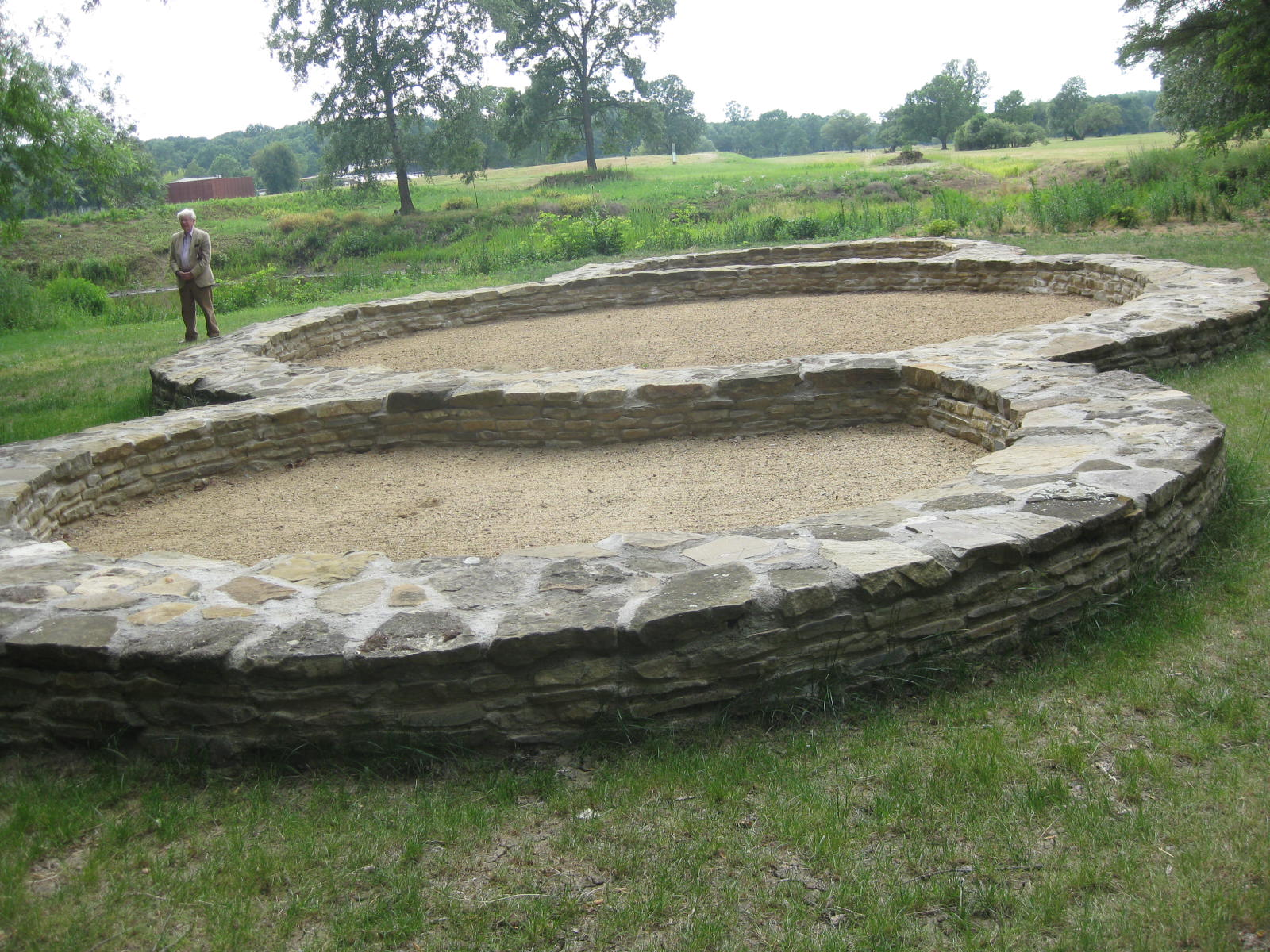

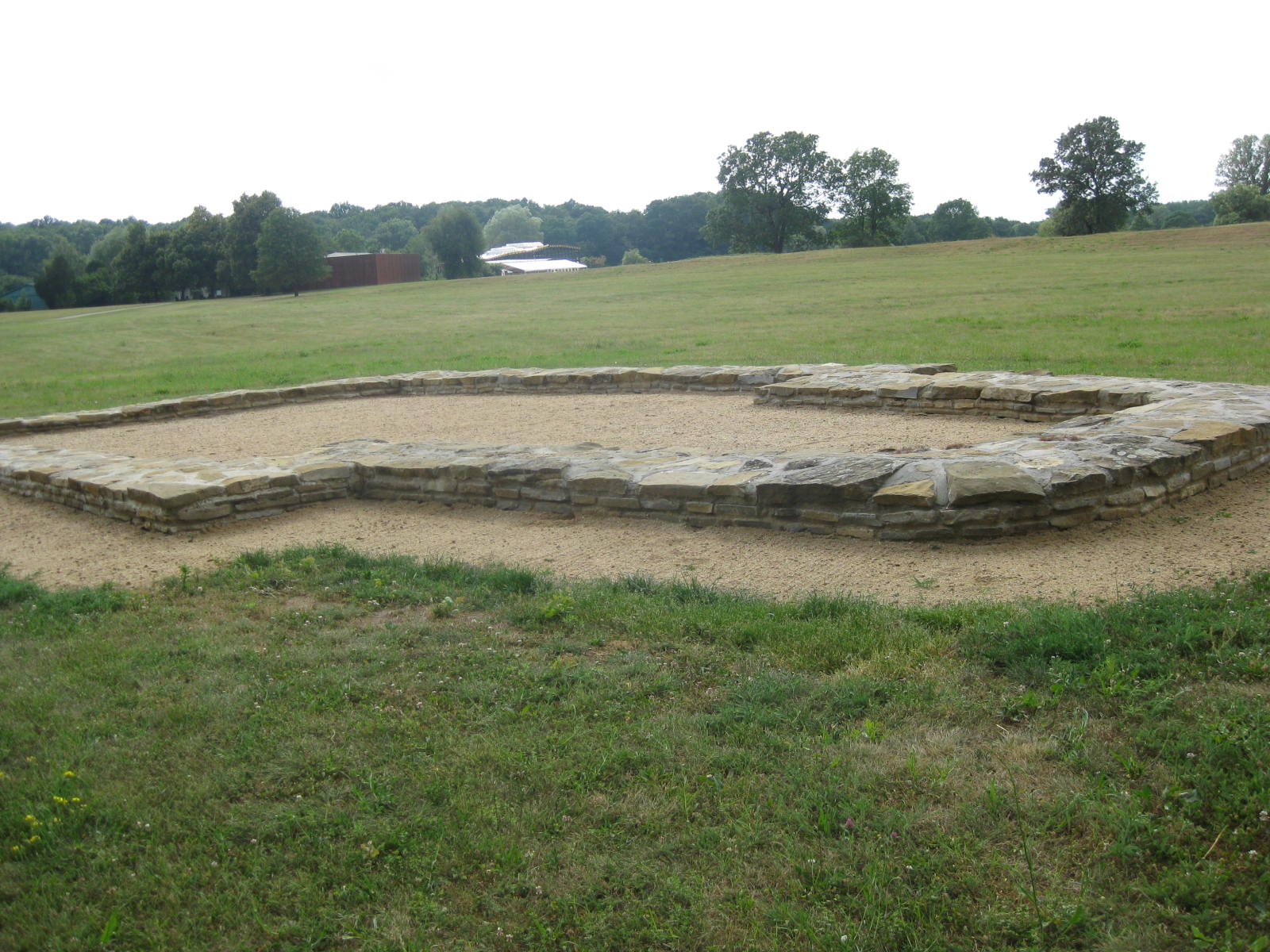

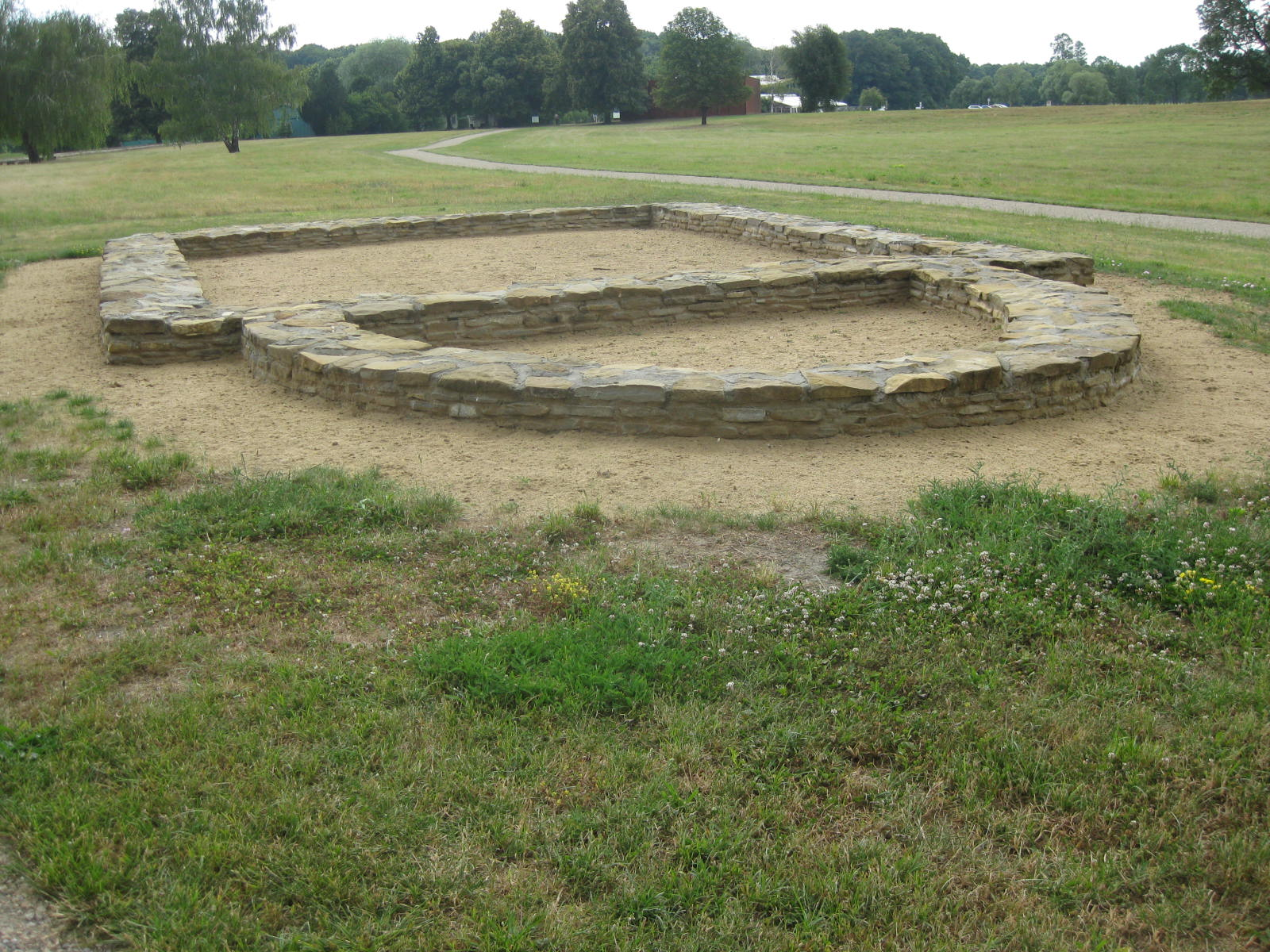

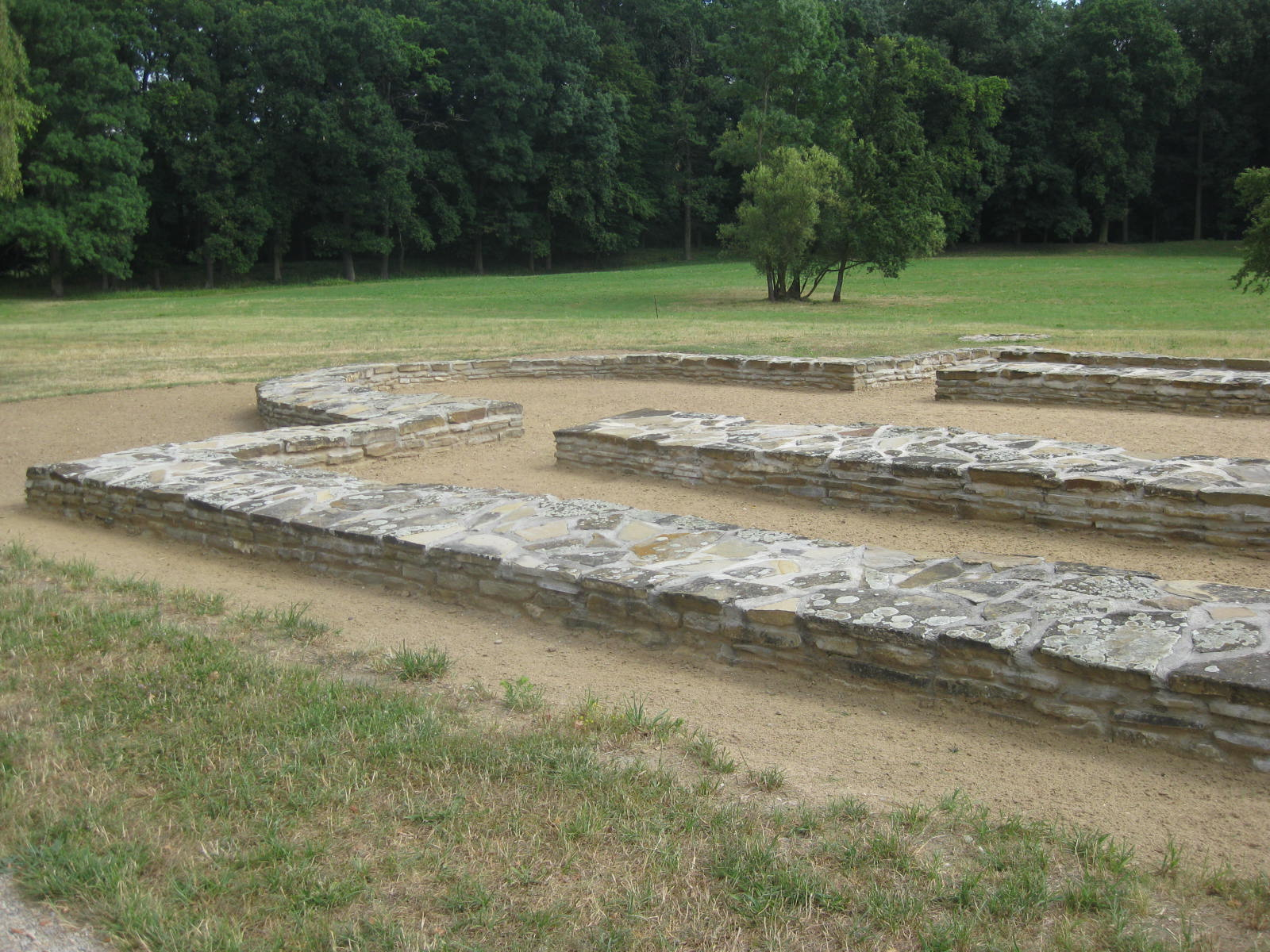

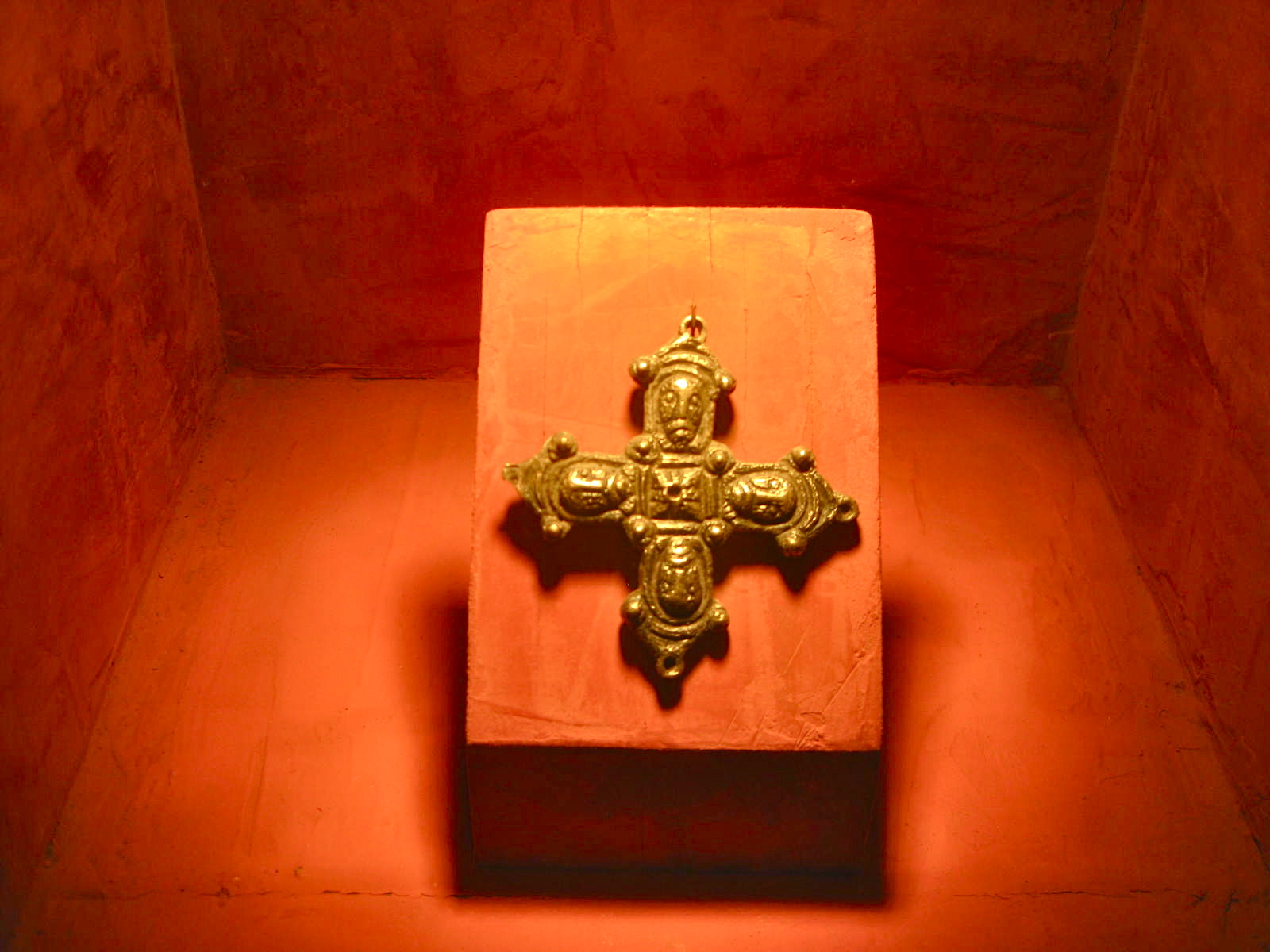

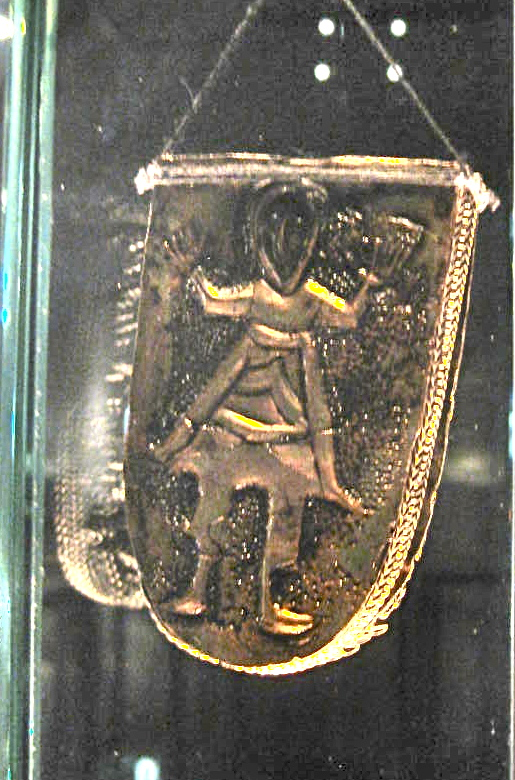

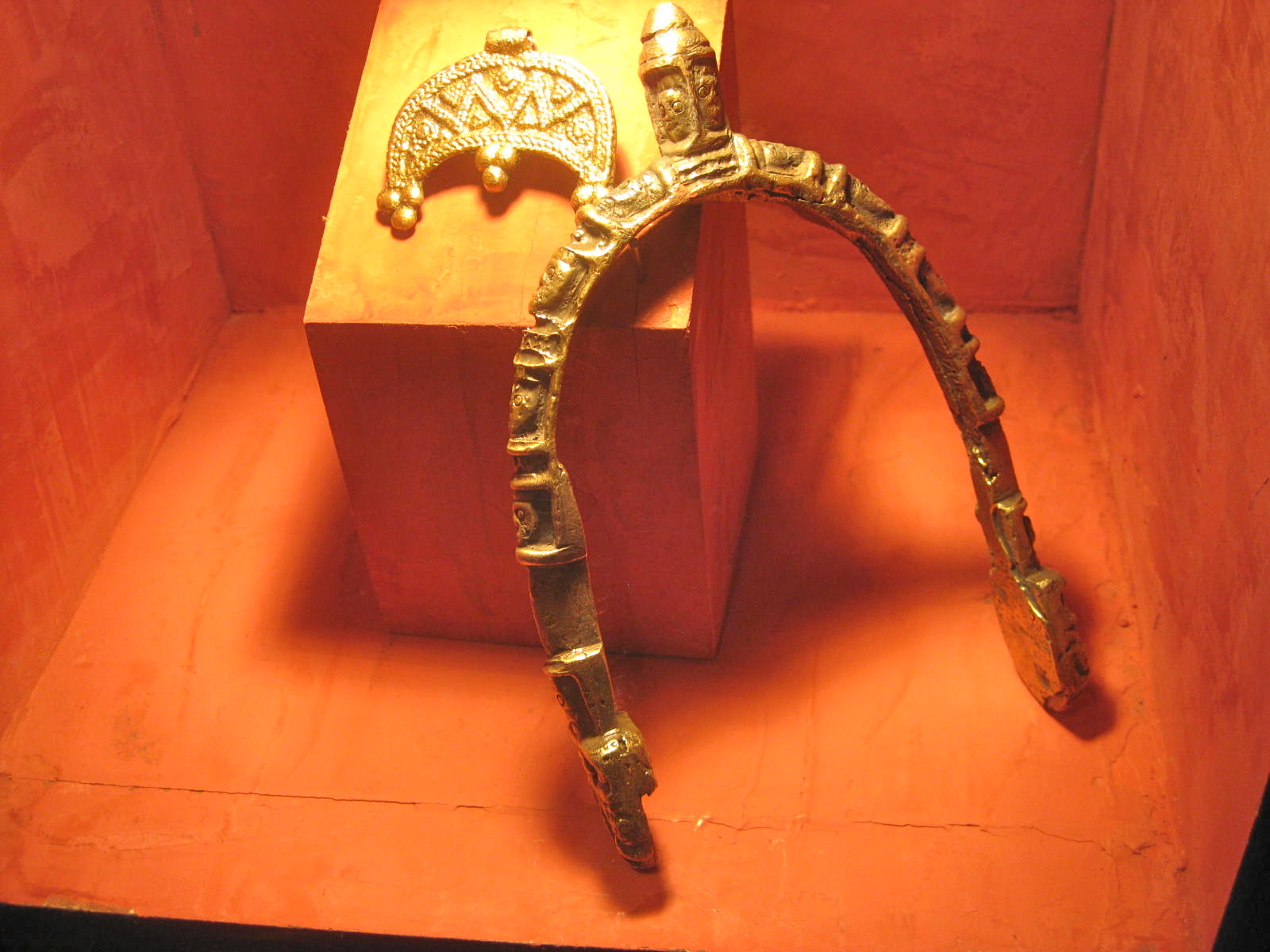

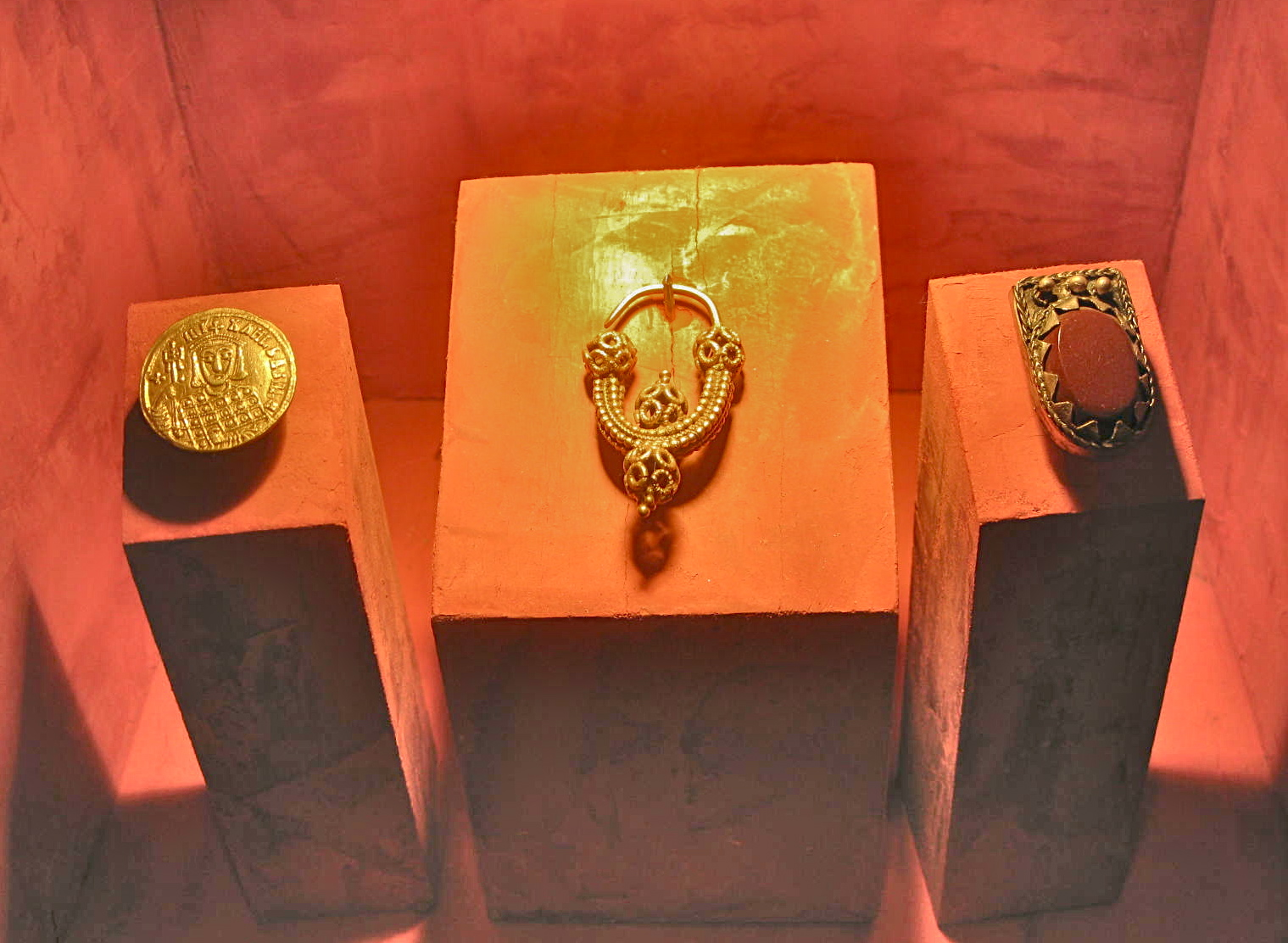

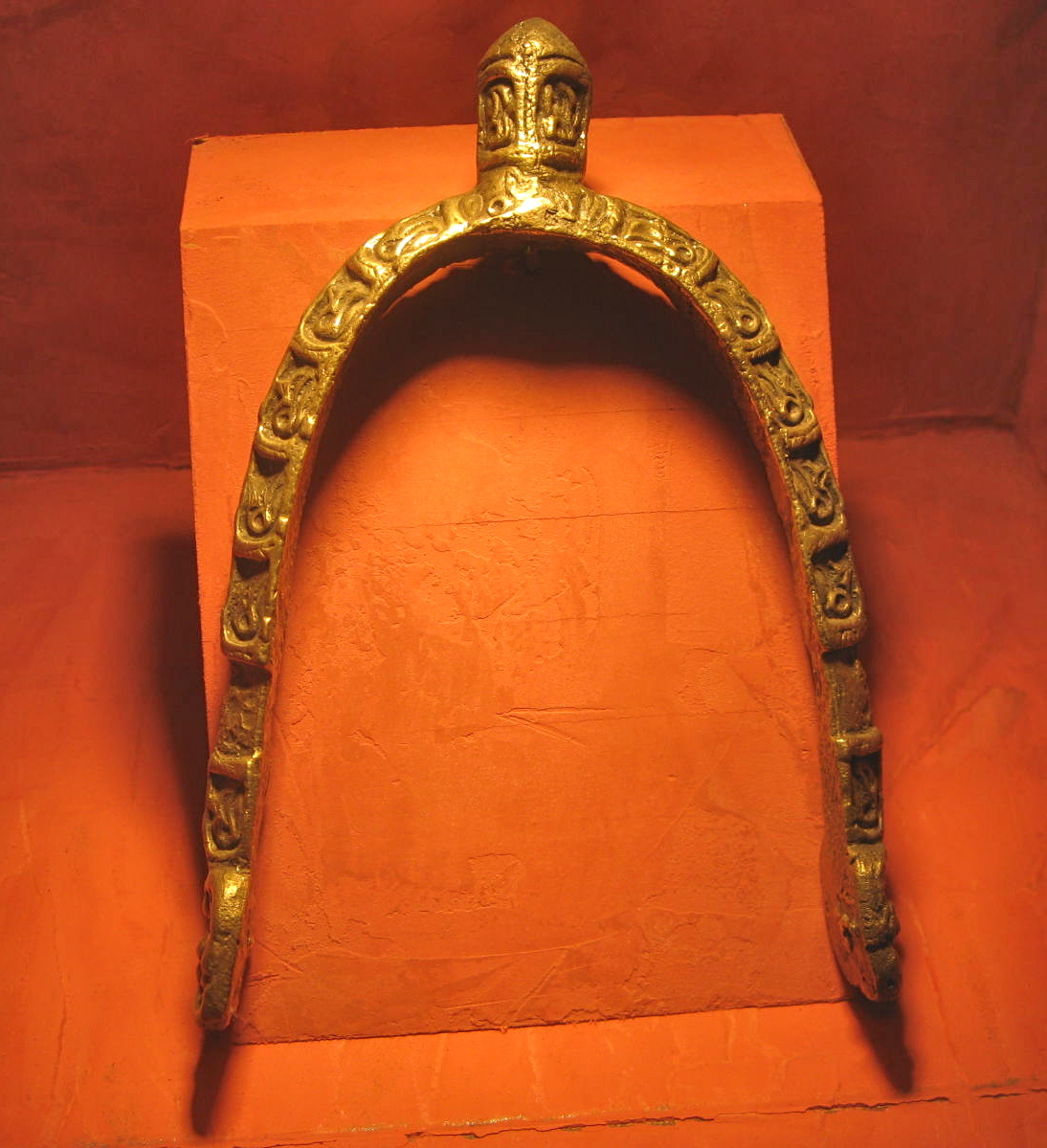

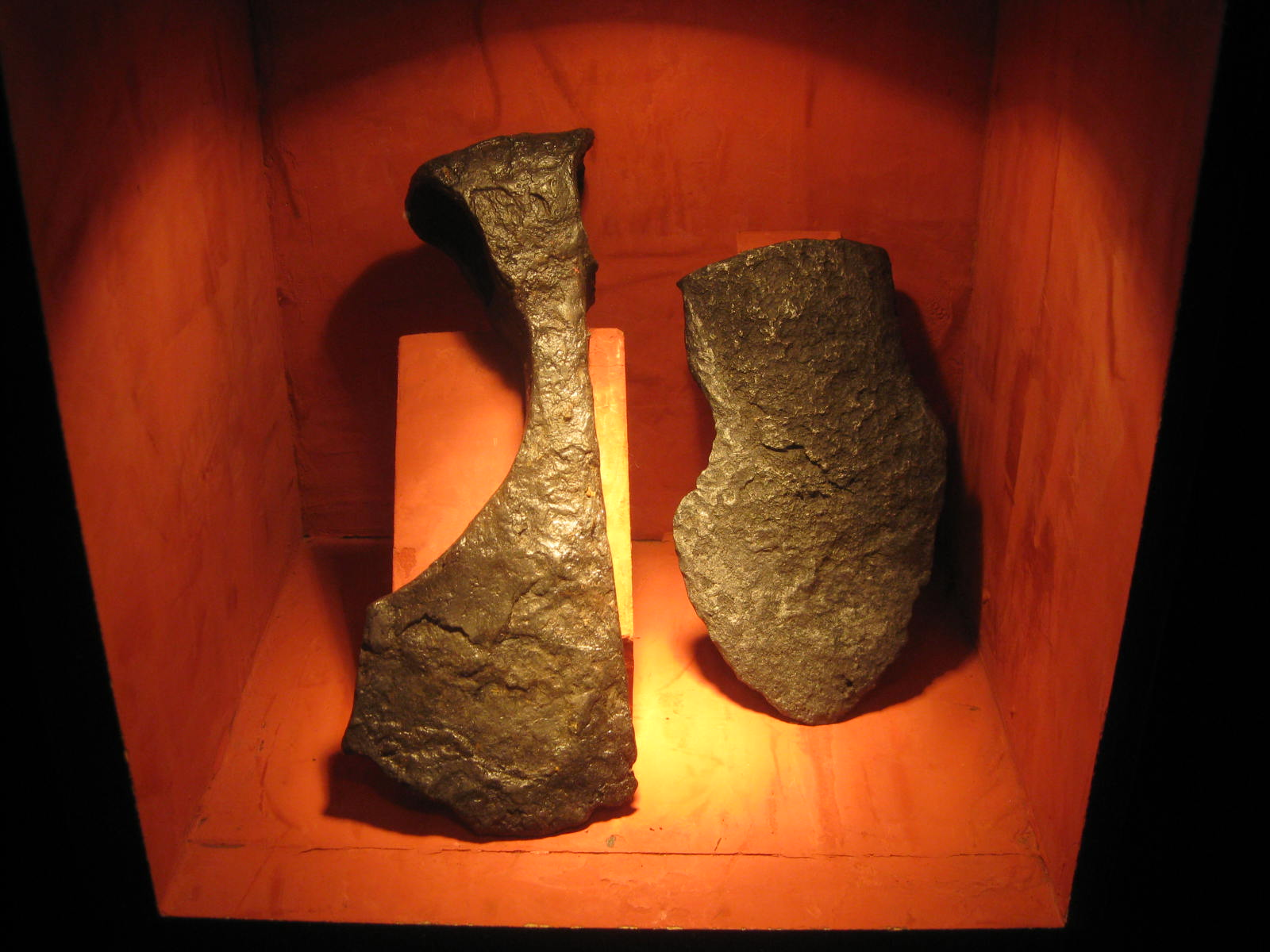

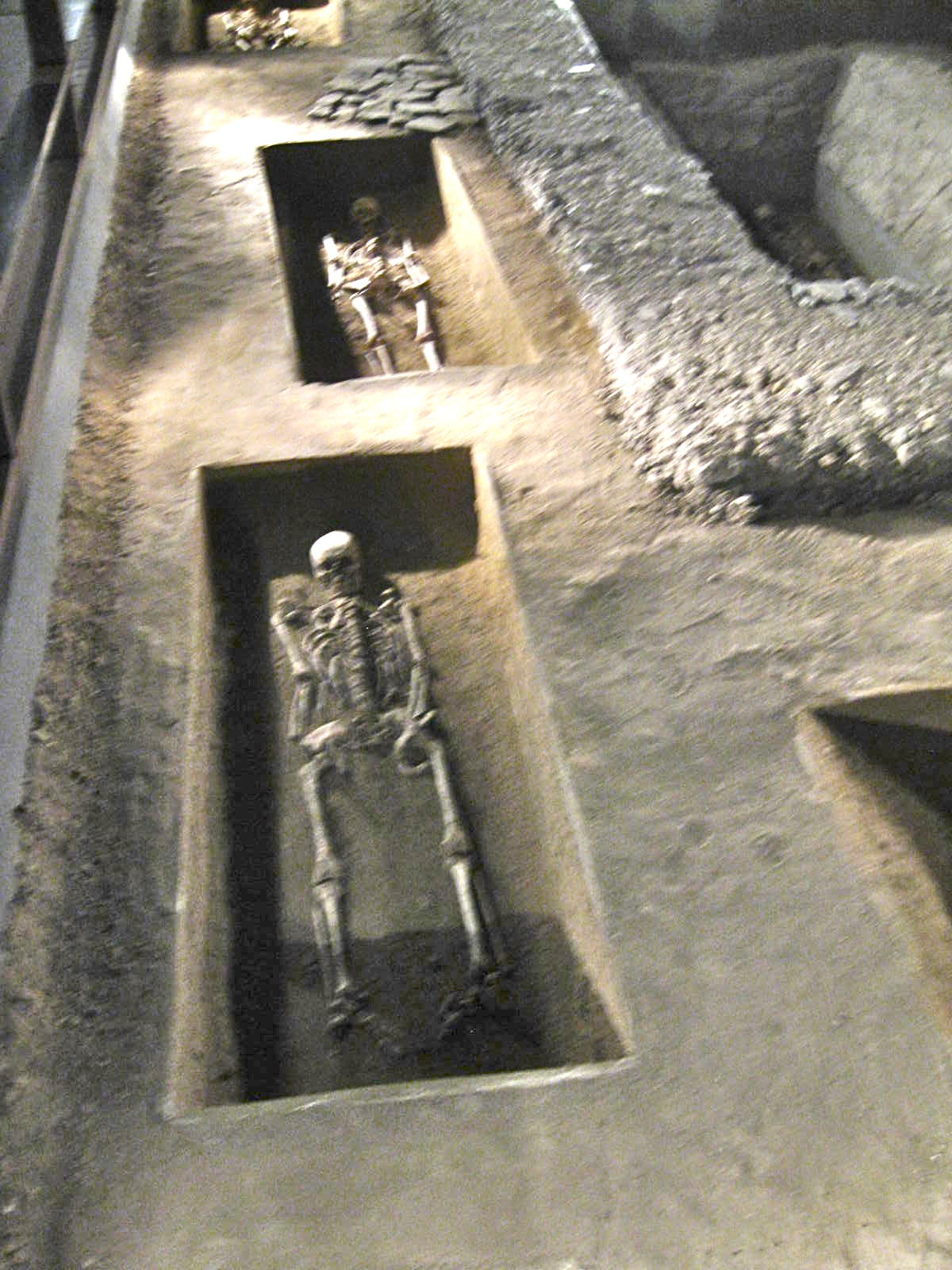

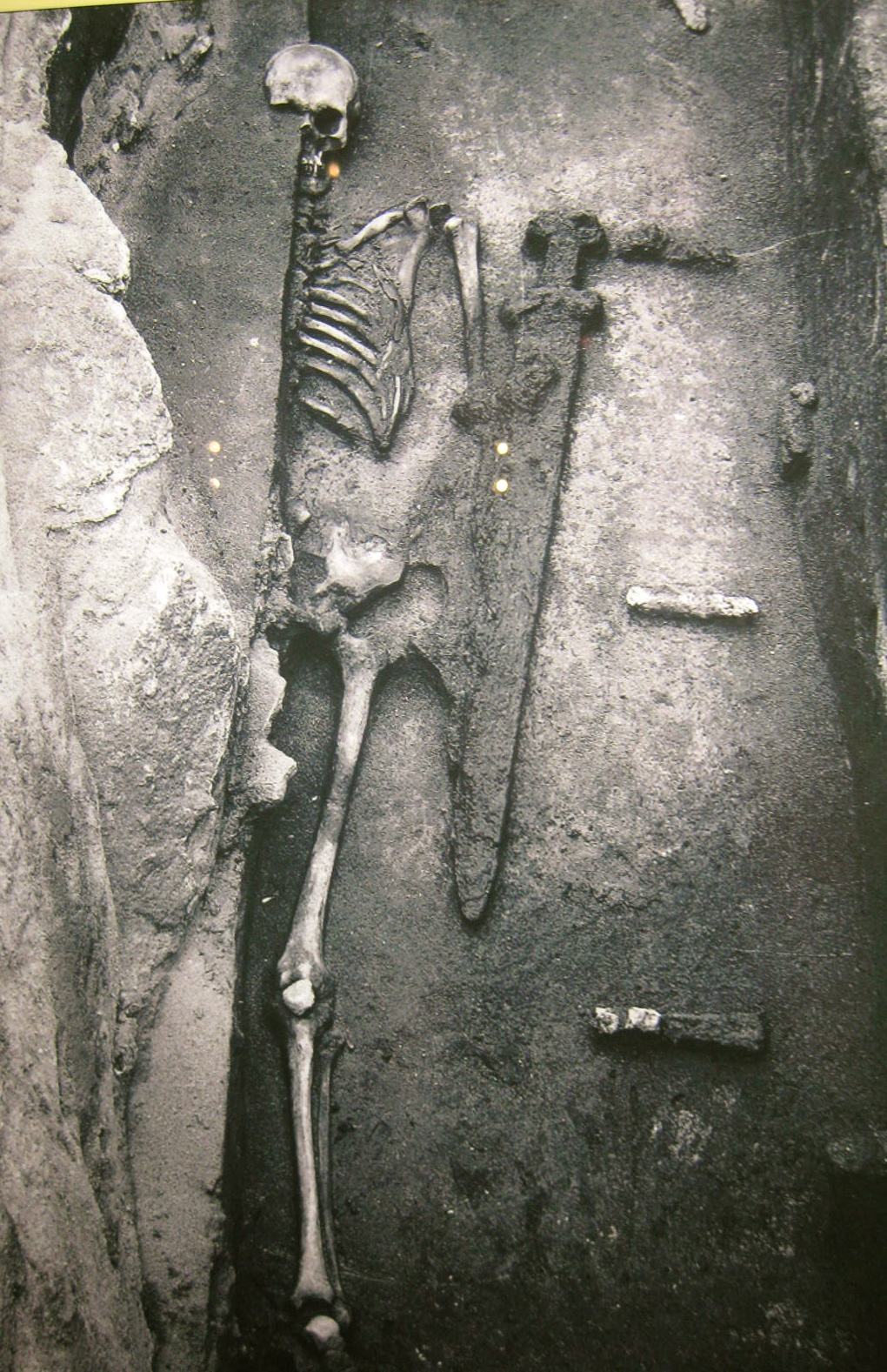

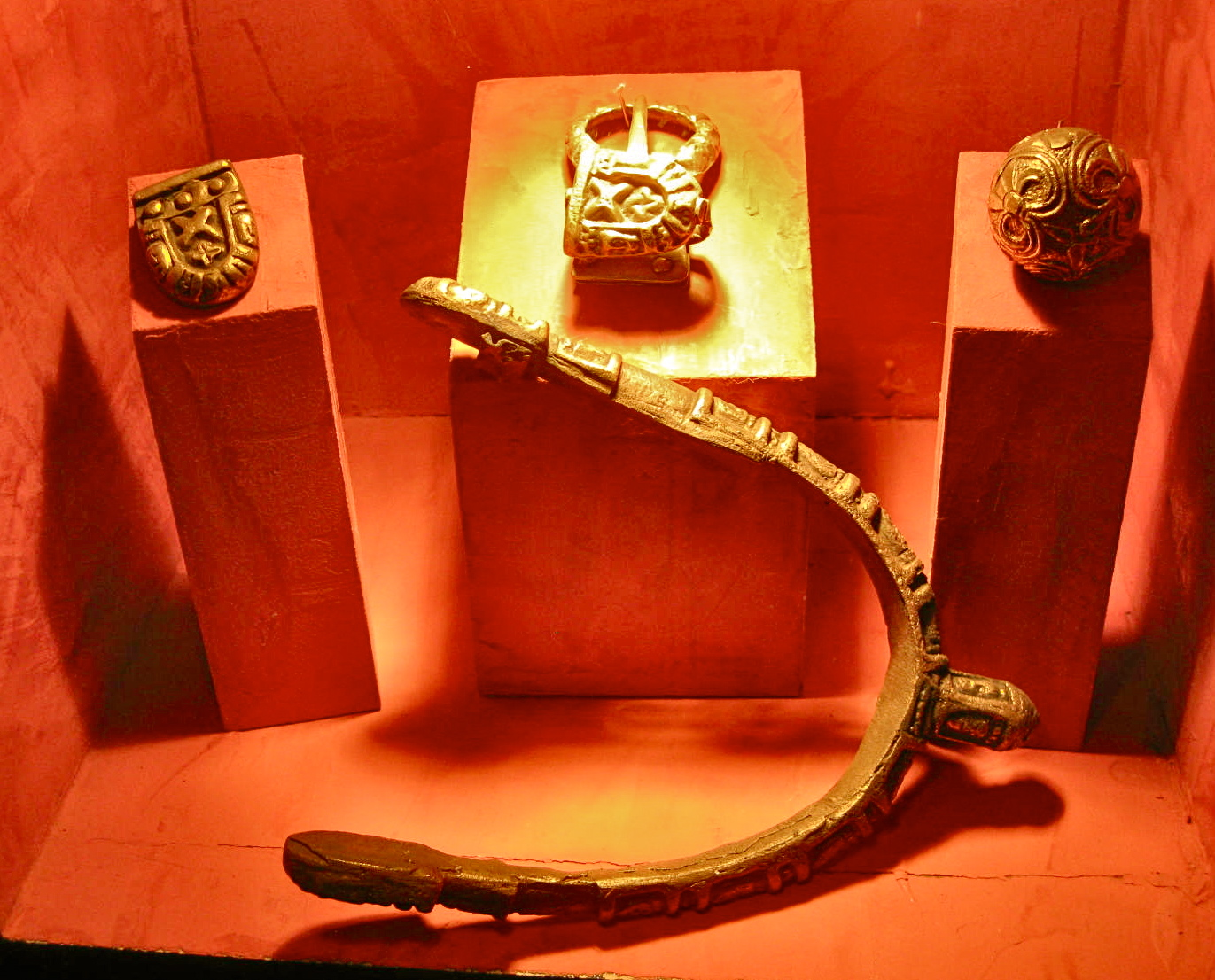

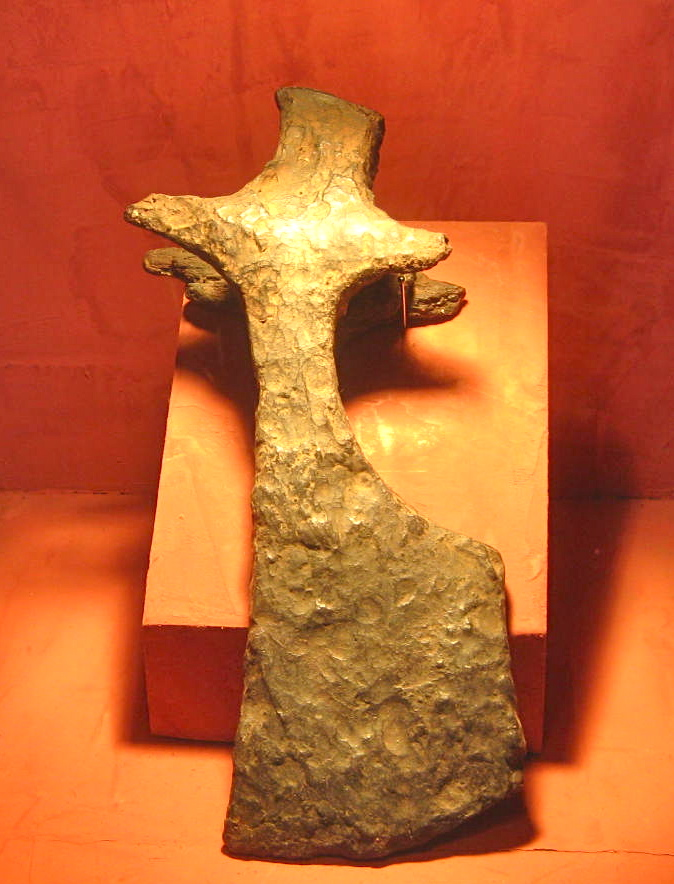

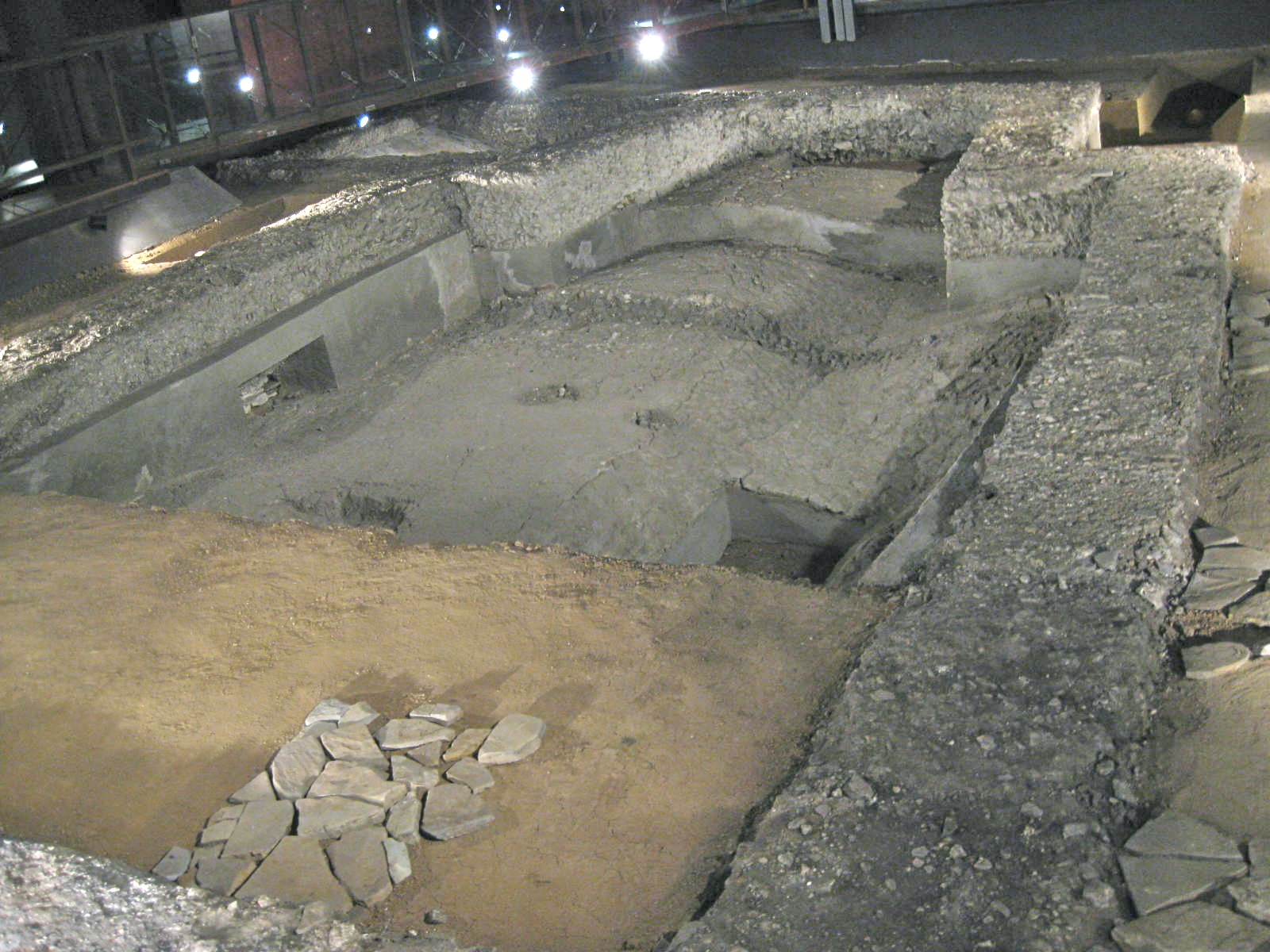

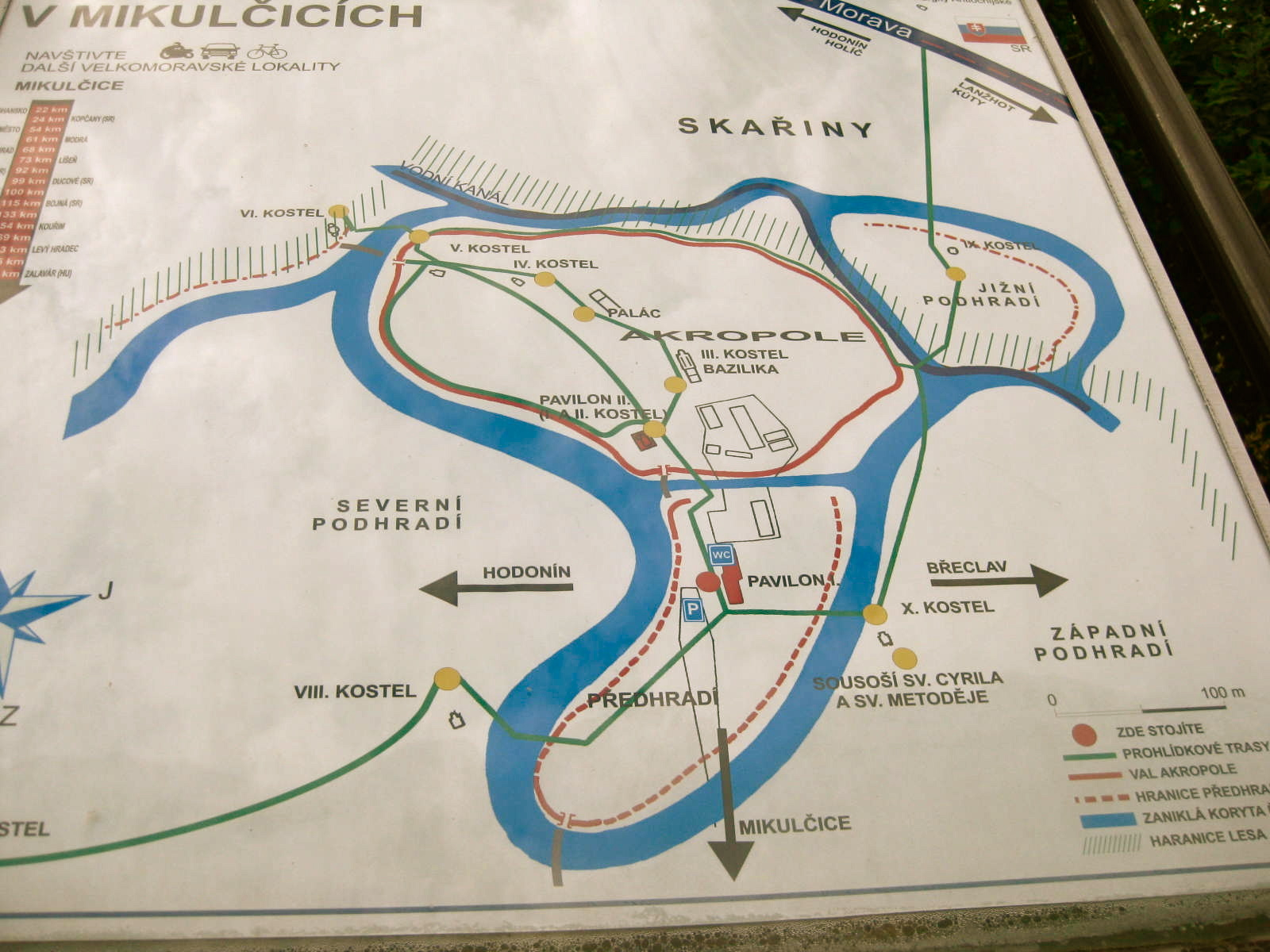

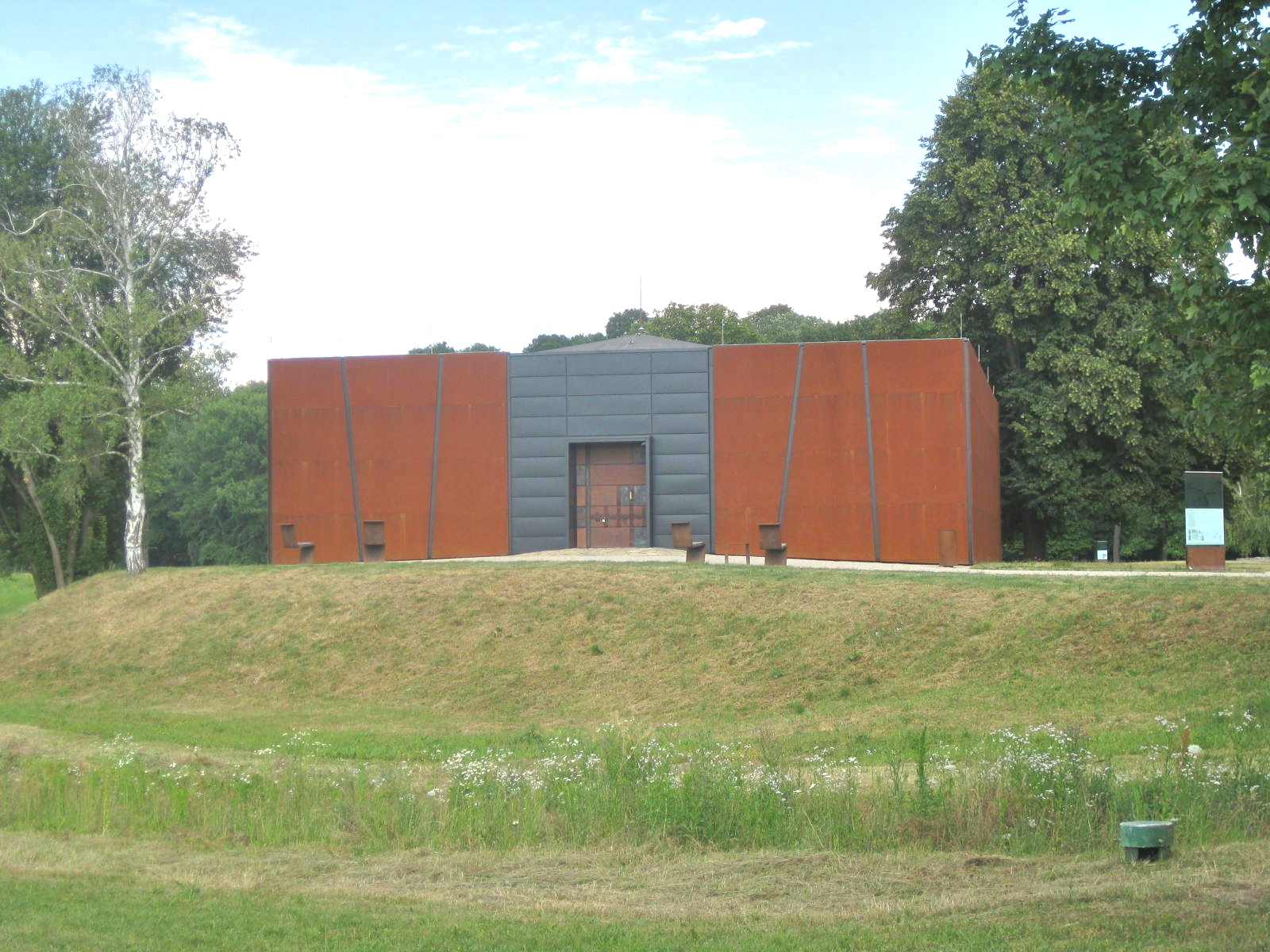

== See also ==
- Church of Saint Margaret of Antioch, Kopčany which lies c 2 km to the east and dates to the 9th century AD
- Modrá, a municipality with similar archaeological site
