= Valls (disambiguation) =

Valls is a municipality in Catalonia, Spain.

Valls may also refer to:

- UE Valls, Spanish football club
- Battle of Valls, battle of the Peninsular War
- Les Valls de Valira, municipality in Catalonia, Spain
- De Valls Bluff, Arkansas, town in the United States

== People ==
- Josep Bargalló i Valls (born 1958), Spanish philologist
- Carme Valls (born 1945), Spanish endocrinologist and politician
- Carmen Valls (born 1926), Spanish fencer
- Clàudia Valls, Spanish and Portuguese mathematician
- Dino Valls (born 1959), Spanish painter
- Francisco Valls, Spanish composer and music theorist
- Jordi Valls i Pozo (born 1970), Spanish poet
- Jorge Valls (born 1933), Cuban activist and poet
- Manuel Valls (born 1962), French politician
- Manuel Valls (composer) (1920–1984), Spanish composer
- Oriol Valls (born 1947), American academic and physicist
- Rafael Valls (born 1987), Spanish cyclist
- Sergio Armando Valls (born 1941), Mexican jurist
