= Val, Bhiwandi =

Village in Maharashtra

Val
- village
- Location in Maharashtra, India Val (India)
- Coordinates: 19.2578778°N 73.0316727°E
- Country: India
- State: Maharashtra
- District: Thane
- Taluka: Bhiwandi
- Elevation: 4 m (13 ft)

Population (2011)
  - Total: 1,487
- Time zone: UTC+5:30 (IST)
- 2011 census code: 552663

Val is a village in the Thane district of Maharashtra, India. It is located in the Bhiwandi taluka.

== Demographics ==
According to the 2011 census of India, Val has 332 households. The effective literacy rate (i.e. the literacy rate of population excluding children aged 6 and below) is 91.51%.

Demographics (2011 Census)
| | Total | Male | Female |
|---|---|---|---|
| Population | 1487 | 836 | 651 |
| Children aged below 6 years | 179 | 87 | 92 |
| Scheduled caste | 18 | 13 | 5 |
| Scheduled tribe | 29 | 13 | 16 |
| Literates | 1197 | 716 | 481 |
| Workers (all) | 613 | 538 | 75 |
| Main workers (total) | 598 | 533 | 65 |
| Main workers: Cultivators | 35 | 27 | 8 |
| Main workers: Agricultural labourers | 5 | 3 | 2 |
| Main workers: Household industry workers | 13 | 7 | 6 |
| Main workers: Other | 545 | 496 | 49 |
| Marginal workers (total) | 15 | 5 | 10 |
| Marginal workers: Cultivators | 1 | 0 | 1 |
| Marginal workers: Agricultural labourers | 0 | 0 | 0 |
| Marginal workers: Household industry workers | 0 | 0 | 0 |
| Marginal workers: Others | 14 | 5 | 9 |
| Non-workers | 874 | 298 | 576 |
