= Valis =

Valis may refer to:

- Valis (novel series), a series of science fantasy novels by Philip K. Dick
  - Valis (novel), the first novel in the series
- Valis (video game series), a video game series which began in 1986
  - Valis: The Fantasm Soldier, first game in the series
- VALIS (band), a Seattle rock band fronted by former Screaming Trees bassist Van Conner
- Valis, Iran, a village in Zanjan Province, Iran
