= Siege of Pozsony (1052) =

1052 siege of a Hungarian border fortress by the Holy Roman Empire

- Part of the German–Hungarian Wars
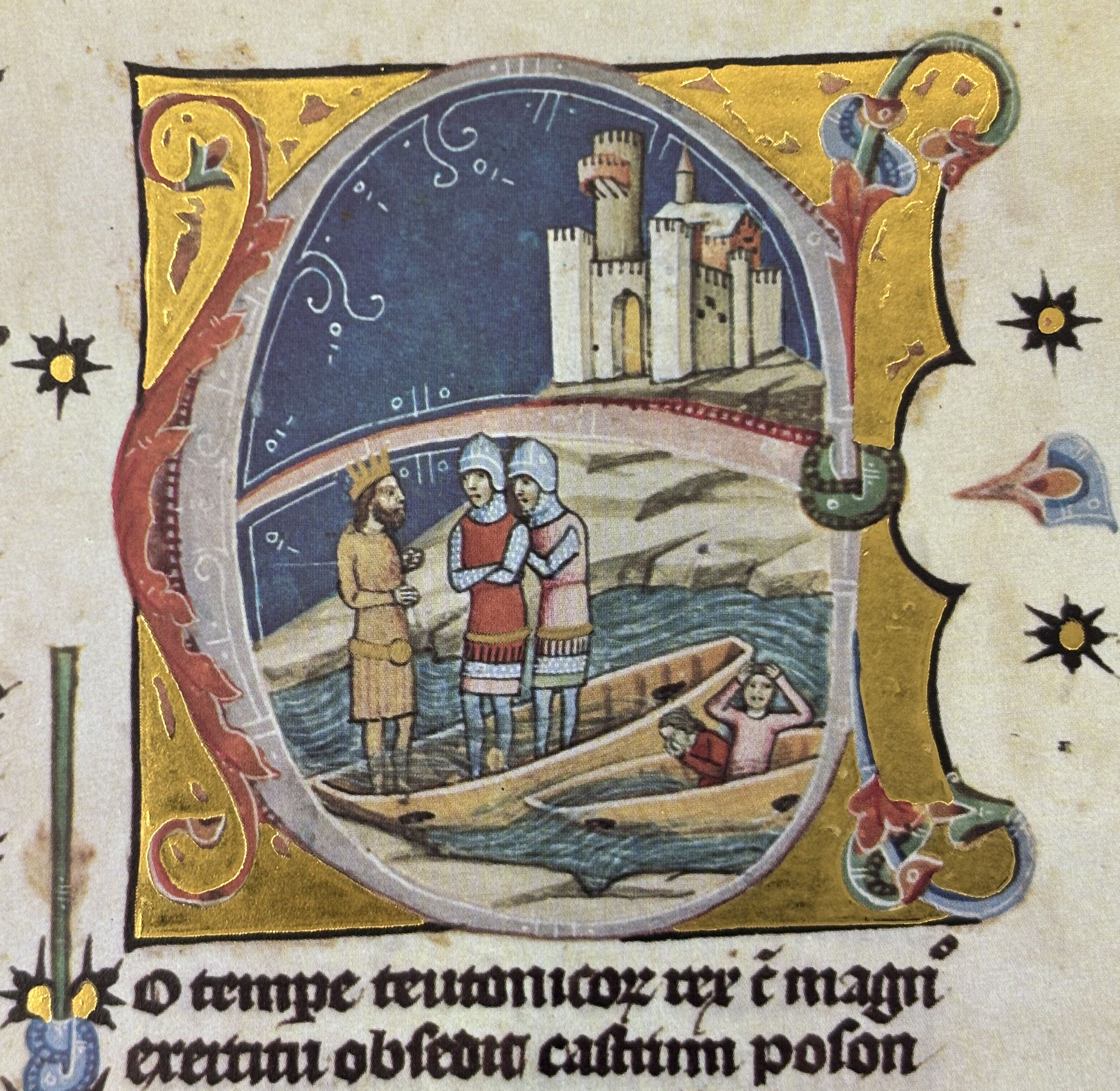
- The destruction of Emperor Henry III's fleet at Pozsony (Illuminated Chronicle, 1358)
| Date | 1052 |
| Location | Pozsony, Kingdom of Hungary (now Bratislava, Slovakia) |
| Result | Hungarian victory |

Belligerents
| Holy Roman Empire | Kingdom of Hungary |

Commanders and leaders
| Henry III, Holy Roman Emperor | |

The Siege of Pozsony or Siege of Pressburg took place in 1052, when the armies of the Holy Roman Empire, led by Emperor Henry III, laid siege to the Hungarian border fortress of Pozsony (now Bratislava, Slovakia). The siege ended in a victory for the Hungarian defenders, who successfully repelled the invading forces.

== Background ==
Kingdom of Hungary in the 11th Century – German Wars

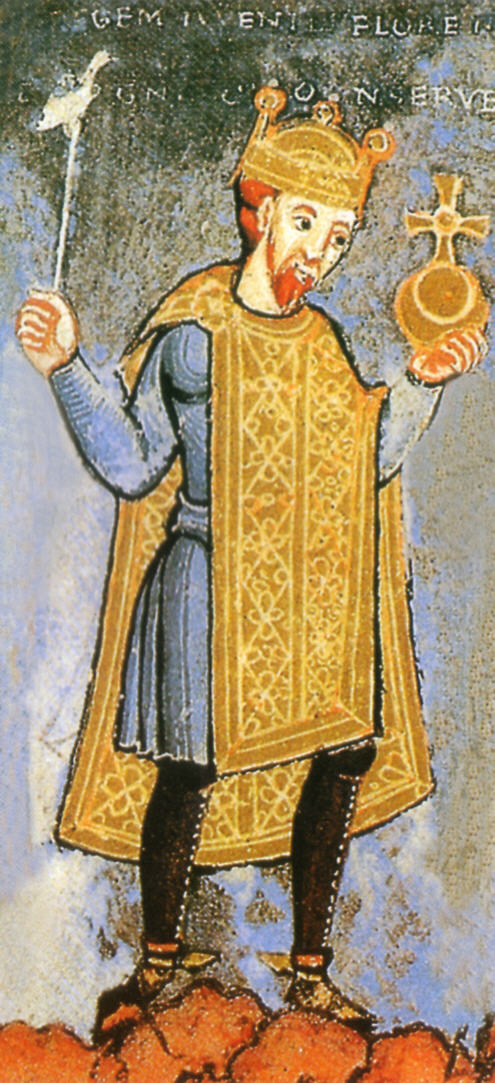
Henry III, Holy Roman Emperor, mid-11th century miniature

After his defeat at the Battle of Vértes in 1051, Emperor Henry III launched another campaign against the Kingdom of Hungary in 1052. Having learned from the mistakes of the previous year, he kept his army close to the Danube, making the fortress of Pozsony his primary objective. Following its capture in 1042, the fortress had been strengthened, making it a much more difficult target for the imperial forces.

== The siege ==
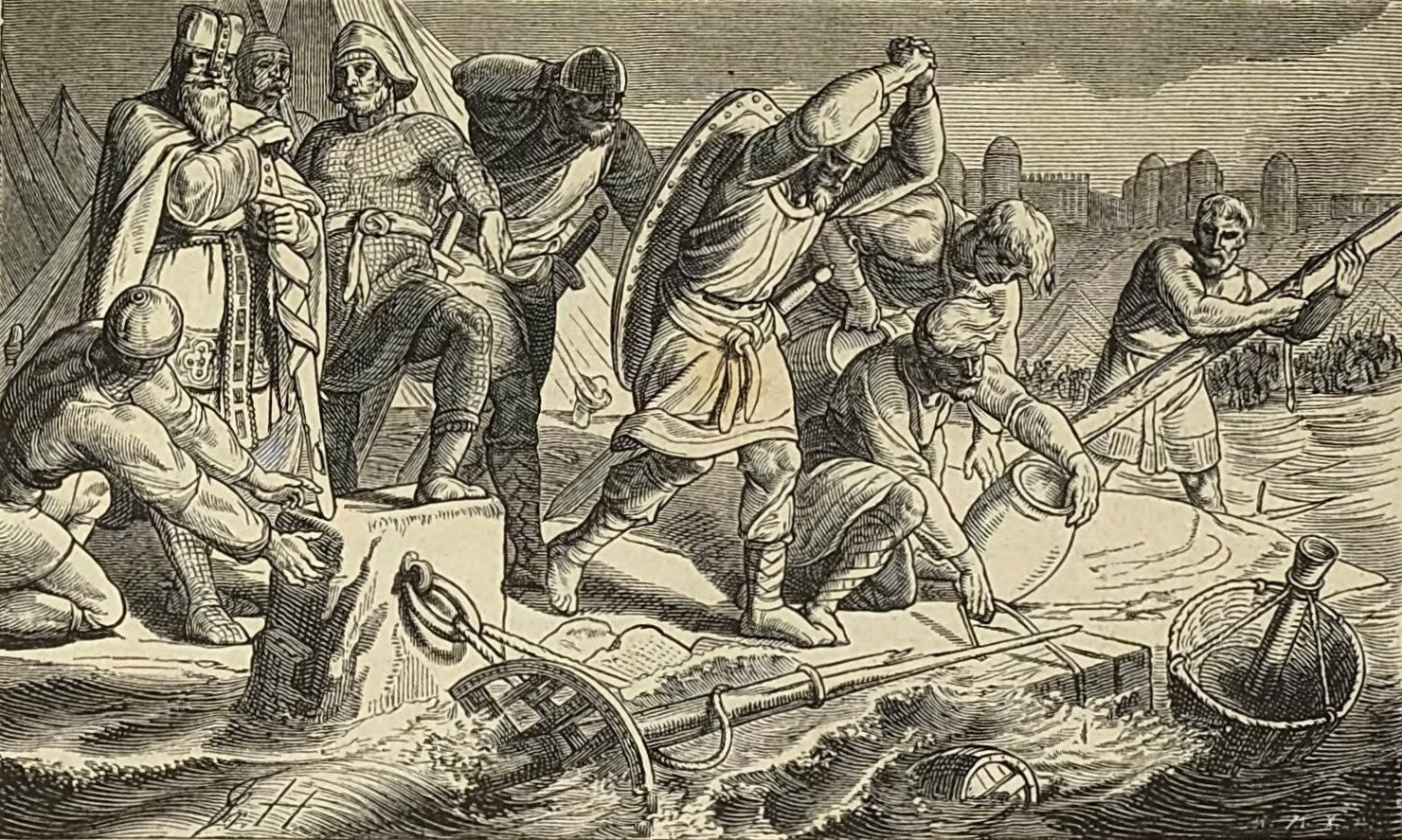
Ships of Henry III sunk before Pressburg, 1052, drawn by Friedrich Hottenroth around 1875

The fortress was defended only by the ispán (county head) and his garrison, together with the local inhabitants who had taken refuge within its walls. No contemporary written sources record the exact size of the defending force. The defenders also benefited from ample food supplies, enabling them to withstand a prolonged siege. This gave King Andrew I of Hungary sufficient time to summon troops from distant counties. The Hungarian army eventually assembled in the vicinity of Pressburg but avoided a pitched battle with the imperial forces. According to the Illuminated Chronicle, the defenders launched several attacks from the fortress against Emperor Henry III's army.

Knight Zotmund (Kund the Diver) dived into the Danube and scuttled the German ships, saving the castle from siege.

For the aforesaid king [Henry III] had come by boat to lay siege to the castle of Poson [Pressburg]; but the Hungarians who were in the castle found a man, Zotmund by name, who was a most skillful swimmer, and in the night they sent him silently to the emperor's ships, and swimming under water he made holes in all the ships, so that they immediately filled with water. Thus the power of the Germans was broken and, weakened and enervated, they returned home.

— Illuminated Chronicle

== Aftermath ==
The peace negotiations continued for a long time, but they were interrupted in 1056 and only concluded after the accession of the new emperor, Henry IV. The new agreement no longer mentioned Hungarian tribute payments. Instead, to preserve peace, Andrew I's son Solomon and Henry IV's sister Judith were married.

== Legacy ==
Zotmund exploit was celebrated in later songs and works.
