= Great Moravian Basilica in Bratislava =

Slovak 9th century church

Coordinates: 48.1421°N 17.1011°E

- Veľkomoravská bazilika na Bratislavskom hrade
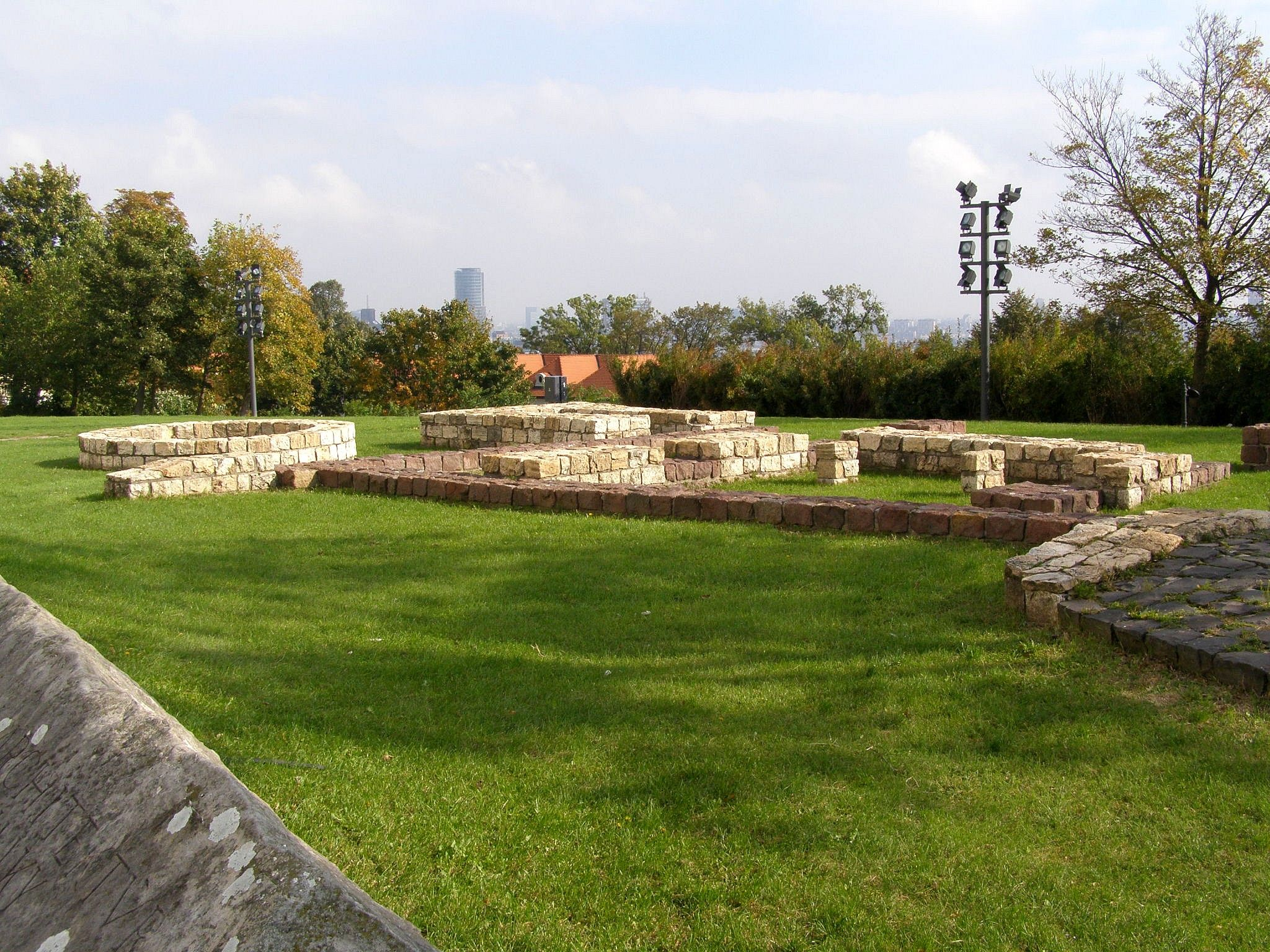

Religion
- Affiliation: Eastern Orthodox

Location
- Location: Bratislava
- Country: Slovakia
- Interactive map of Great Moravian Basilica in Bratislava

Architecture
- Type: Church
- Style: Pre-Romanesque, Romanesque
- Completed: 9th century
- Destroyed: 12th century
- Materials: bricks, stone blocks

Great Moravian Basilica in Bratislava was a Great Moravian church from 9th century at the Bratislava hillfort, in the area of current Bratislava Castle.

== Great Moravian basilica ==
Great Moravian pre-romanesque basilica in Bratislava was built sometimes in the second half of 9th century. It was built as the part of great moravian hillfort at the place of former Celtic oppidum. It's the largest Great Moravian basilica at the territory of Slovakia, and it was one of the biggest Great Moravian churches. It was 12.8–13 metres (42–43 ft) wide and according to some reconstructions, its original length could have been almost 20 m (66 ft). The east end of the church has not been preserved, but on the basis of comparisons with other buildings from this period, it's concluded that it was formed by three apses. Bricks, stone blocks and roofing from an older Roman buildings from the Celtic oppidum were used as a building material. The red paint and part of the painting decoration have been preserved on the plaster remains.

During 10th century, pre-romanesque basilica was probably destroyed. For a short time, tower, which was part of the fortifications was built on the place of basilica.

Floorpan of Great Moravian basilica in Bratislava

== Romanesque church of St. Saviour ==
In the 10th century, early romanesque basilica of Saint Saviour was built on the same place. After the year 1200, circular romanesque charnel with a diameter of 3.5 metres (11 ft) was built next to the basilica. At the time, Bratislava was the seat of priory. In 1221 it was decided, that the priory with the church should move from the castle area. New church was built under the castle hill, at the place of current St Martin's Cathedral.

A cemetery was discovered around the basilica. It was buried on it from the 9th to the 12th century. In addition to skeletal finds, various objects, hollow bronze gilded buttons with ornaments, silver earrings and other finds were found in the graves.

== Current status ==
The remains of church buildings are presented in the form of partial foundations. There is also information board with a description nearby. Remains are located a few meters from the castle, in its area, and they are freely accessible.
