= Statue of Svätopluk =

Statue located in Bratislava, Slovakia

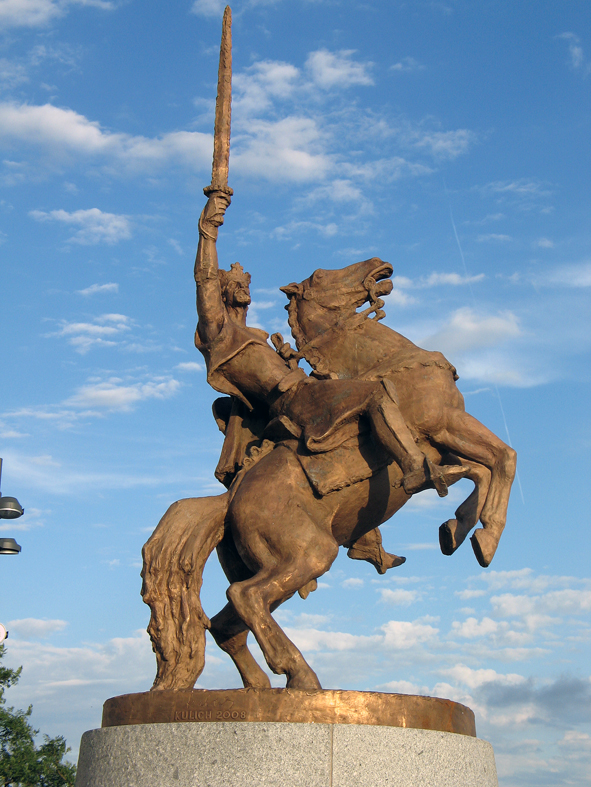
- Statue of Svätopluk at Bratislava Castle
- Interactive map of Statue of Svätopluk
- Location: Bratislava castle, Slovakia
- Coordinates: 48°08′30″N 17°06′00″E
- Designer: Ján Kulich
- Material: Bronze
- Height: 7.8 meters

Statue of Svätopluk (Slovak: Socha Svätopluka) is an equestrian bronze statue depicting Svätopluk, the third ruler of Great Moravia, located in the courtyard of Bratislava Castle in Bratislava, Slovakia. The creator of the statue is the Slovak sculptor Ján Kulich [sk].

== Description ==
The statue, cast in bronze, is 7.8 meters high, including its granite pedestal. Part of the disputed original inscription: "King of the Old Slovaks" has been removed from the pedestal. The pedestal thus quotes, under the name of Svätopluk and the dates, the beginning of the text of the bull Industriae tuae of Pope John VIII, which he sent to Svätopluk in 880.

== History ==
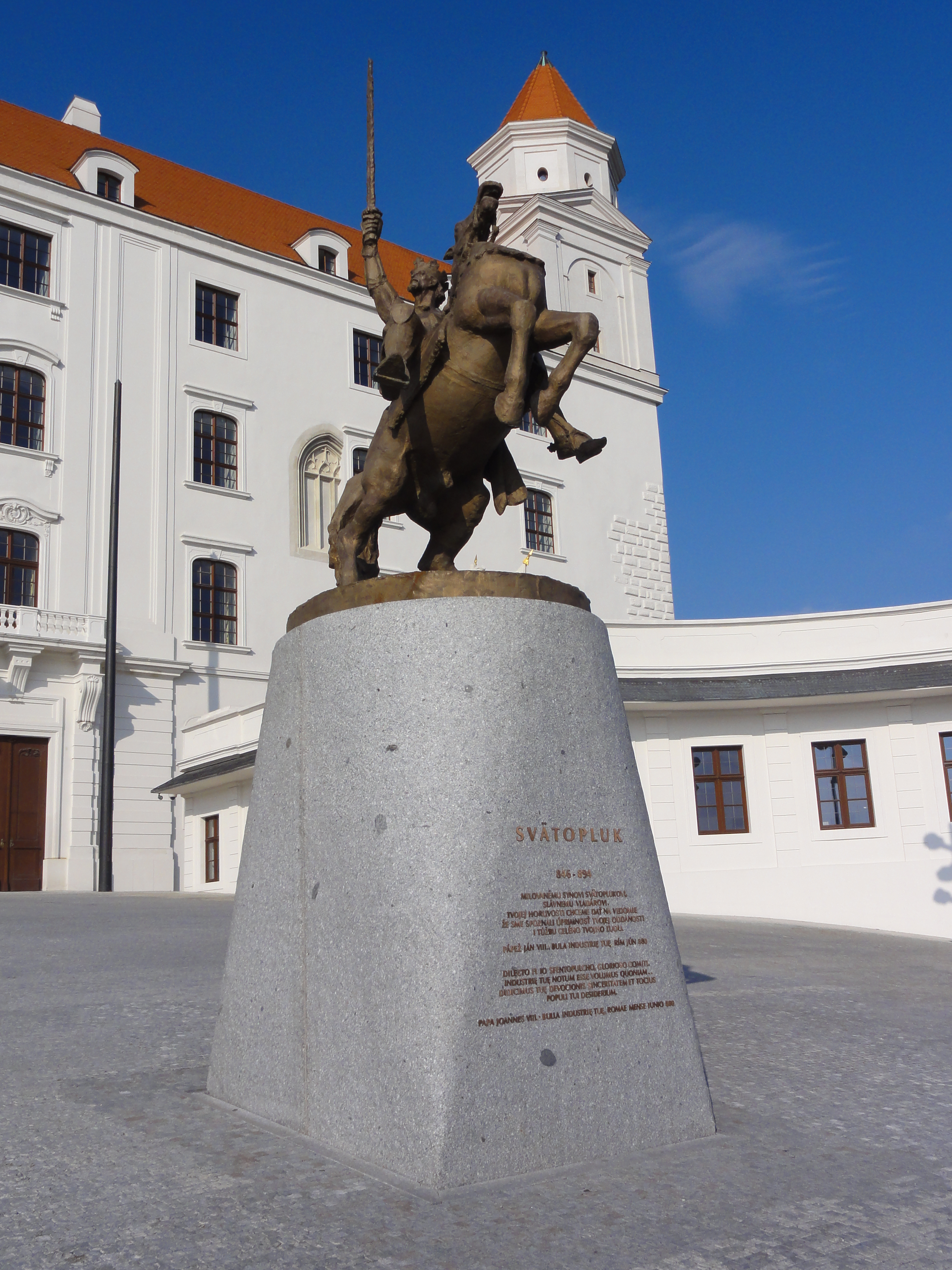
The statue next to the Bratislava Castle.

=== Creation ===
The authorship of the idea of creating the statue was claimed by the now deceased journalist and writer Drahoslav Machala and historian Matúš Kučera. However, the idea of building the monument is older and dates back to the period of the Slovak Republic. A fundraiser was held to finance the bronze casting of the statue, organized by the Svätopluk civic association.

=== Unveiling of the statue ===
The unveiling of the statue of Svätopluk on June 6, 2010, less than a week before the parliamentary elections, was attended by, in addition to the three highest constitutional officials, mainly ministers, deputies and county governors of the Smer party. It was also broadcast on live television, where it was watched by 231,000 viewers.

=== Restoration ===
In October 2010, at the initiative of the Chairman of the National Council of the Slovak Republic, Richard Sulík, and the author of the statue, Ján Kulich, covered the isosceles double cross on the statue's pediment with a metal cover. Sulík explained this modification as suppressing associations of the double cross on the pediment with the emblem of the Hlinka Guard.

== Controversy and criticism ==
After the unveiling of Sväntopluk, the statue received criticism for it design from many prominent Slovak artists. It was mainly criticized for having many meaningless elements and symbols used. Its entire modeling and placement was considered strange. It was even rumored that the statue would be removed entirely, but was eventually left in its place.

A month after the unveiling of the statue of Svätopluk in the courtyard of Bratislava Castle, no one was able say how and for what money the monument was erected for. The funds for the monument were collected by the Svätopluk Civic Association, which was founded by President Ivan Gašparovič, Parliament Speaker Pavol Paška, and Prime Minister Robert Fico. The association's website stated that donors had contributed up to 130 thousand euros for the statue. This was less than half of the announced costs for the construction of the statue.

The Svätopluk has been consistently vandalized since its creation.

== Similar statues ==
A statue considered an almost exact replica of the Svätopluk statue exists in the city of Hendersonville, located in the state of Tennessee in the United States.
