= Bratislava Castle =

Castle in Slovakia

Coordinates: 48°08′32″N 17°06′00″E

Bratislava Castle Bratislavský hrad
- Bratislava Old Town; Slovakia
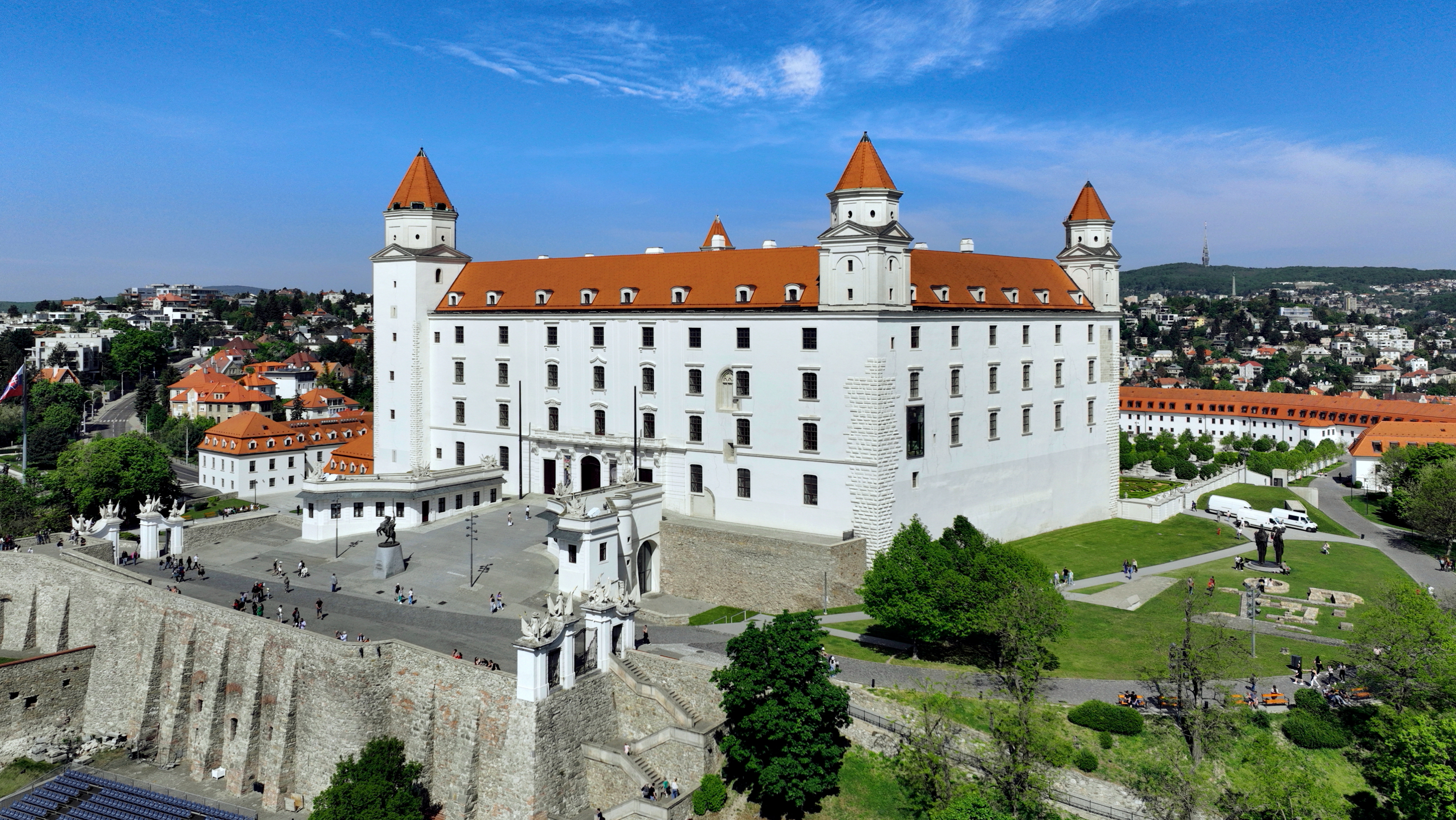
- Bratislava castle

Site information
- Type: Castle
- Controlled by: Great Moravia; Kingdom of Hungary; Czechoslovakia; Slovakia
- Open to the public: outdoor areas nonstop, opening hours apply to the museum

Site history
- Built: 9th–18th centuries Rebuilt in 1956–1964
- Events: Notable events in the castle's life: On 28 May 1811, a fire begun accidentally by garrisoned soldiers gutted the structure; In the 1930s, plans were put forward to either rebuild the castle ruins into a new structure or to destroy it altogether

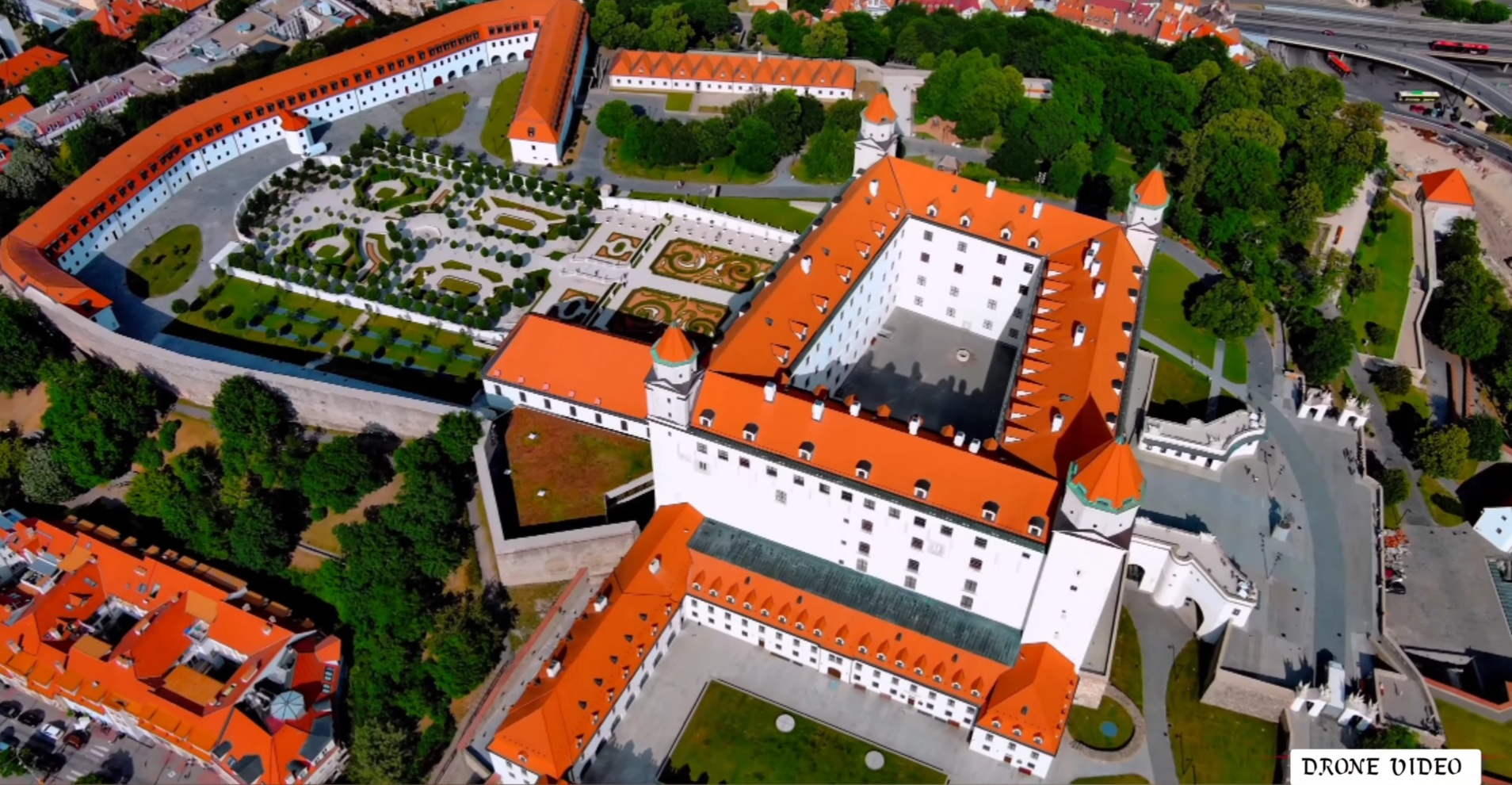
Aerial view of the complex of Bratislava Castle

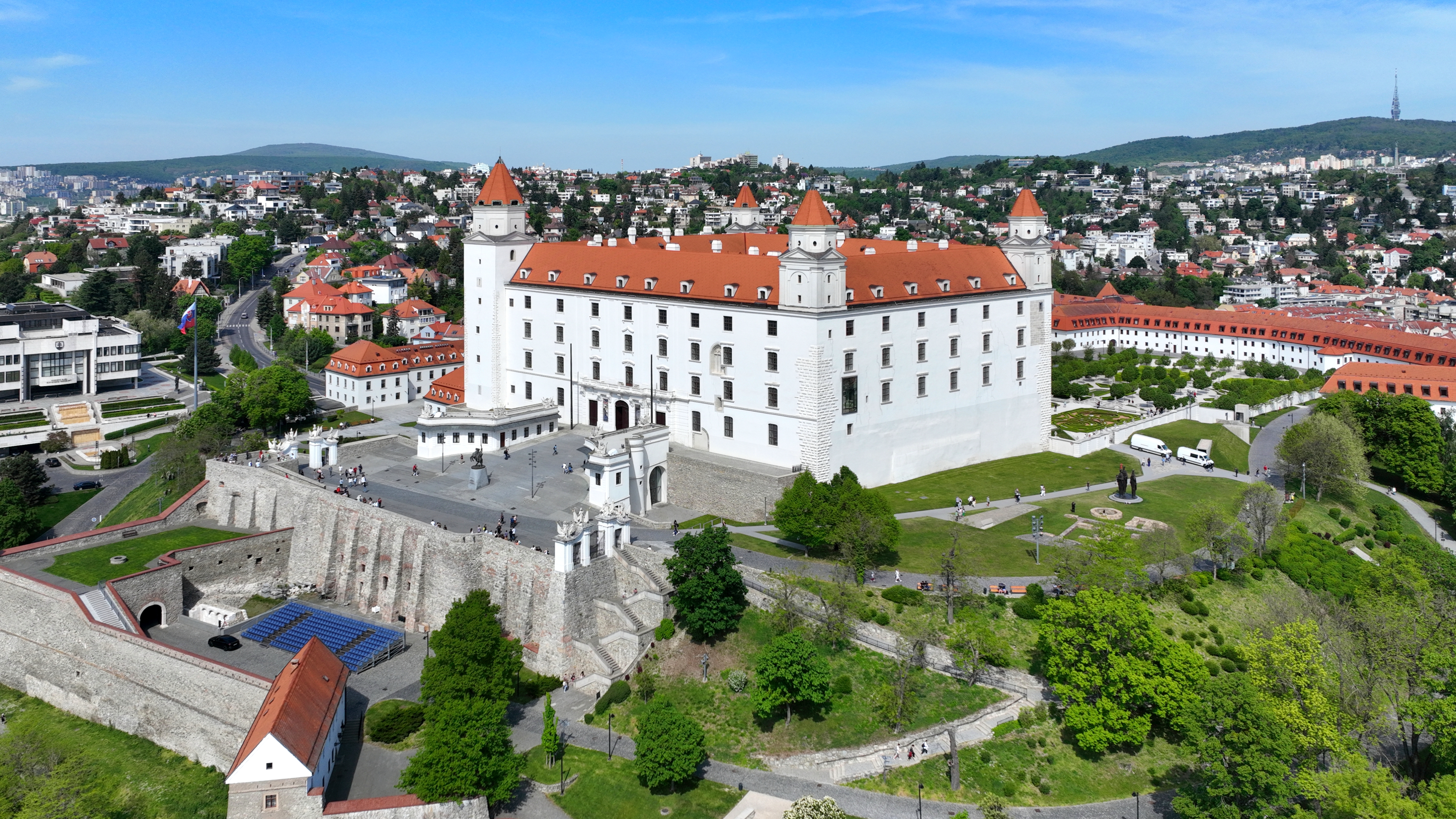
Southeast view of Bratislava Castle

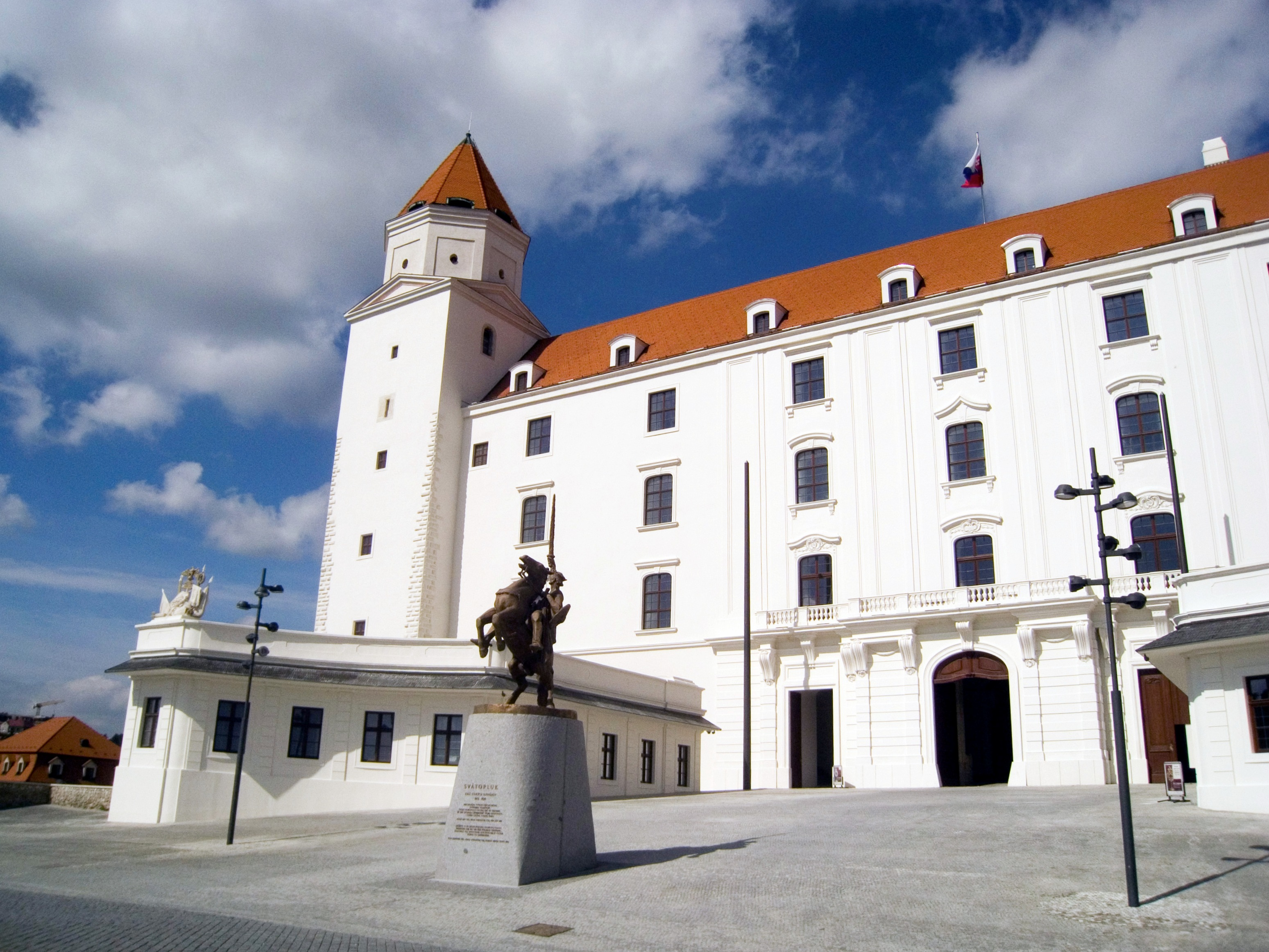
Main entrance to the palace

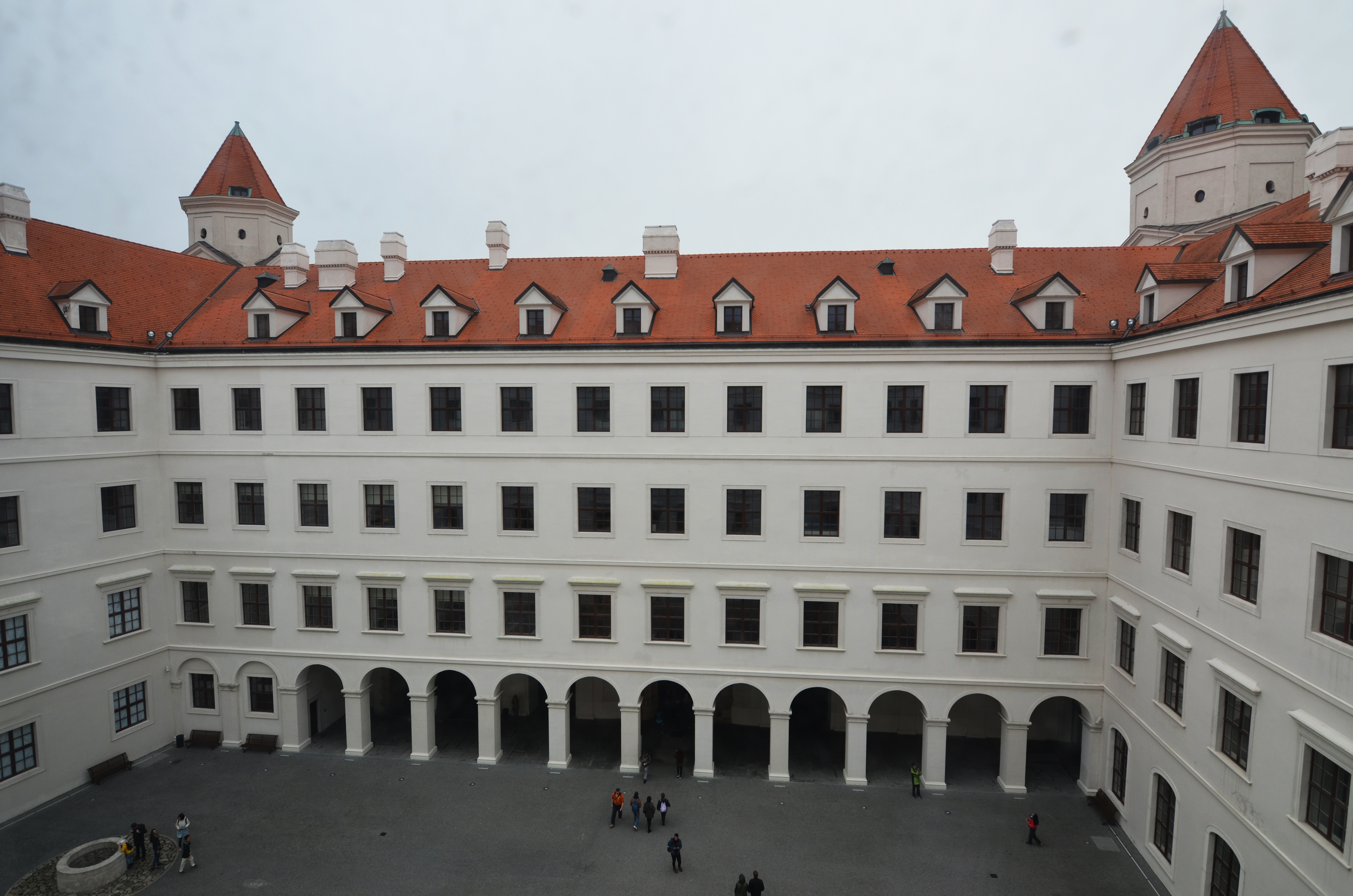
Palace courtyard

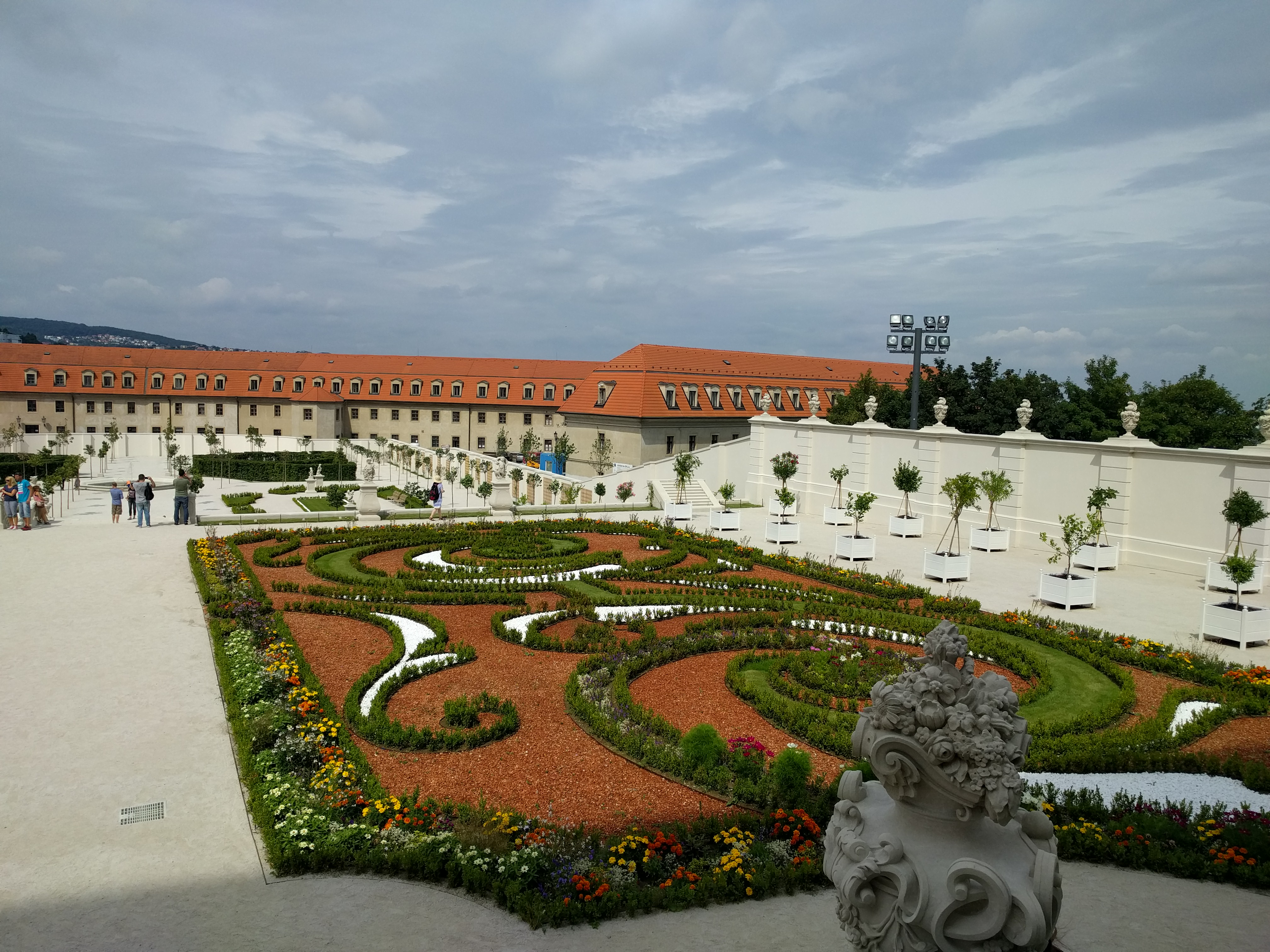
Baroque gardens of Bratislava Castle

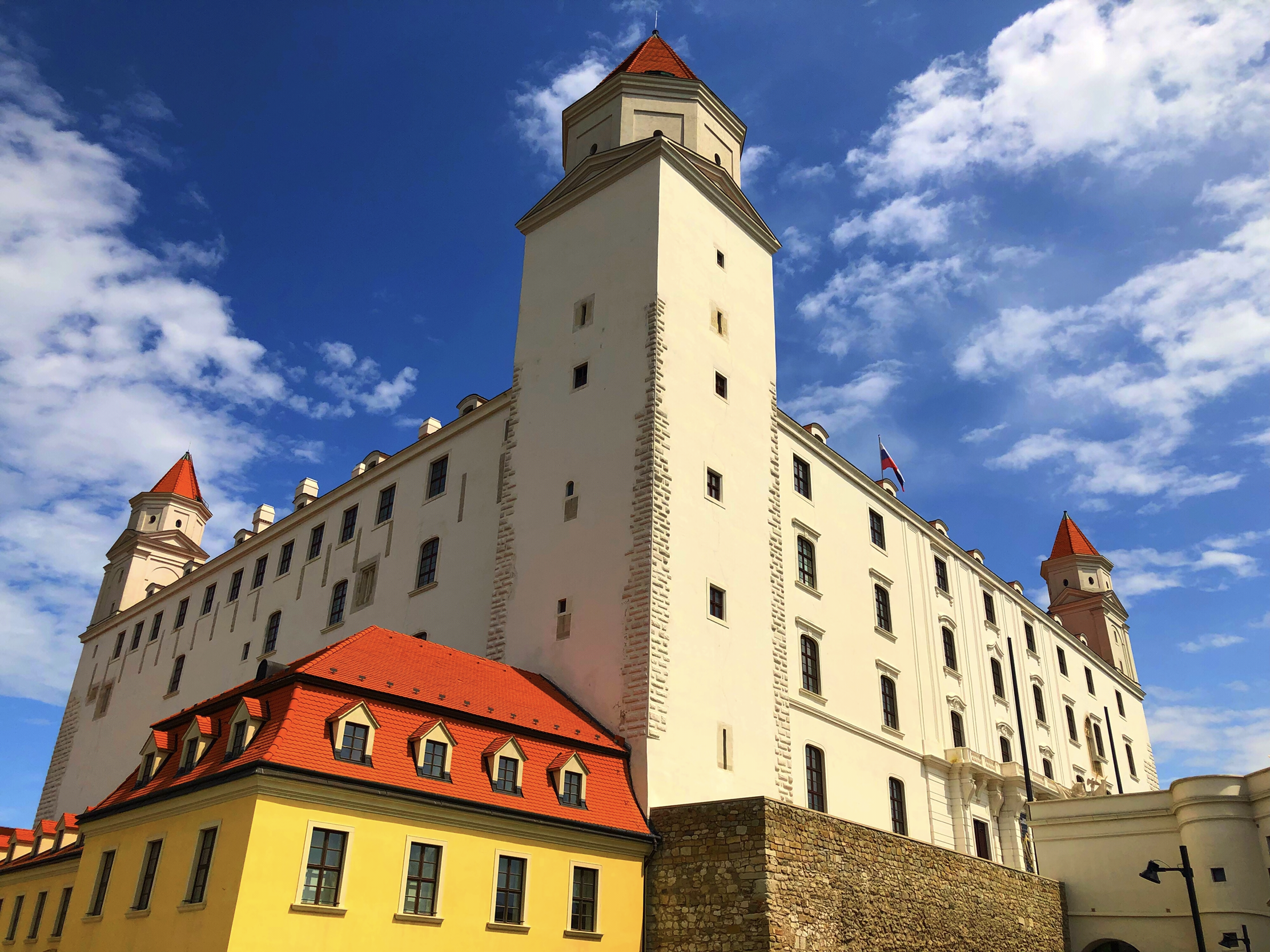
View on the left corner of Bratislava Castle

Bratislava Castle (Slovak: Bratislavský hrad, IPA: [ˈbracislawskiː ˈɦrat]; German: Pressburger Burg; Hungarian: Pozsonyi vár) is the main castle of Bratislava, the capital of Slovakia. The massive rectangular building with four corner towers stands on an isolated rocky hill of the Little Carpathians, directly above the Danube river, in the middle of Bratislava. Because of its size and location, it has been a dominant feature of the city for centuries.

The location provides excellent views of Bratislava, Austria and, in clear weather, parts of Hungary. Many legends are connected with the history of the castle.

== Castle site ==
The following are at the castle site:

=== Castle building ===
The castle building includes four towers (one on each corner) and a courtyard with an 80 m (260 ft) deep water well. The largest and tallest tower is the Crown Tower, on the southwest corner. The 47 m (154 ft) tower dates from the 13th century and for approximately 200 years, beginning in the mid-1500s, housed the crown jewels of Hungary. The exterior walls and inside corridors contain fragments of old Gothic and Renaissance construction elements. The walled-up entrance gate from the 16th century is still visible to the east of the main hall/entrance.

==== Museum ====
Behind the entrance is an arcade corridor leading to a large Baroque staircase which, in turn, leads to the exhibitions of the Slovak National Museum on the second floor. The west wing of this floor houses the four halls of the Treasure Chamber (opened in 1988), with a collection of the most precious archaeological finds and other objects of Slovakia, including the prehistoric statue called the Venus of Moravany. The third floor houses an exhibition on the history of Slovakia. The first floor in the south wing of the building houses the rooms of Slovak parliament —the National Council of the Slovak Republic—including furnishings from the 16th century. The northern wing of the building, the former Baroque chapel, houses the Music Hall, in which concerts are held. The courtyard includes the entrance to the Knights Hall.

=== Entrance gates ===
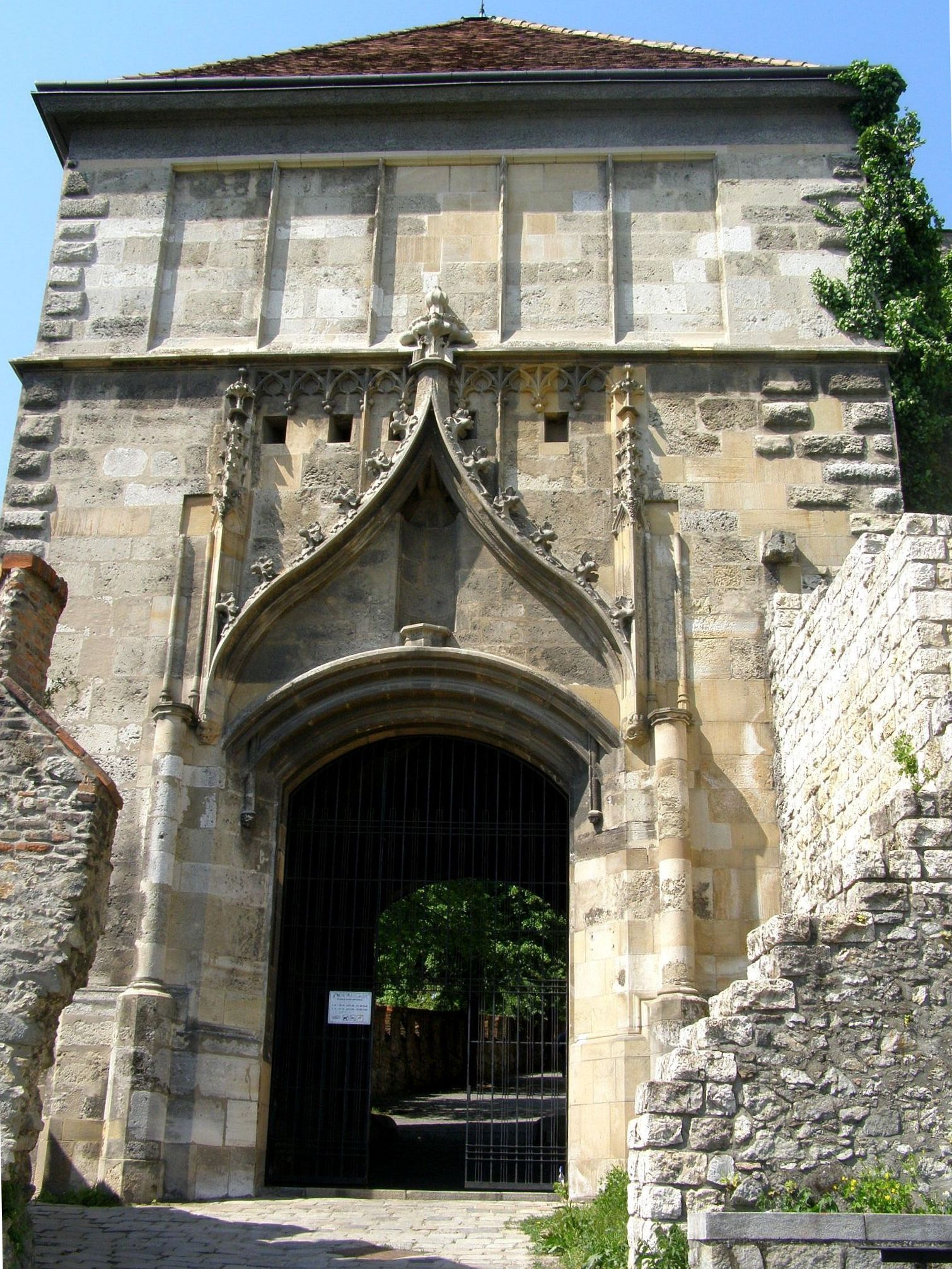
Sigismund Gate

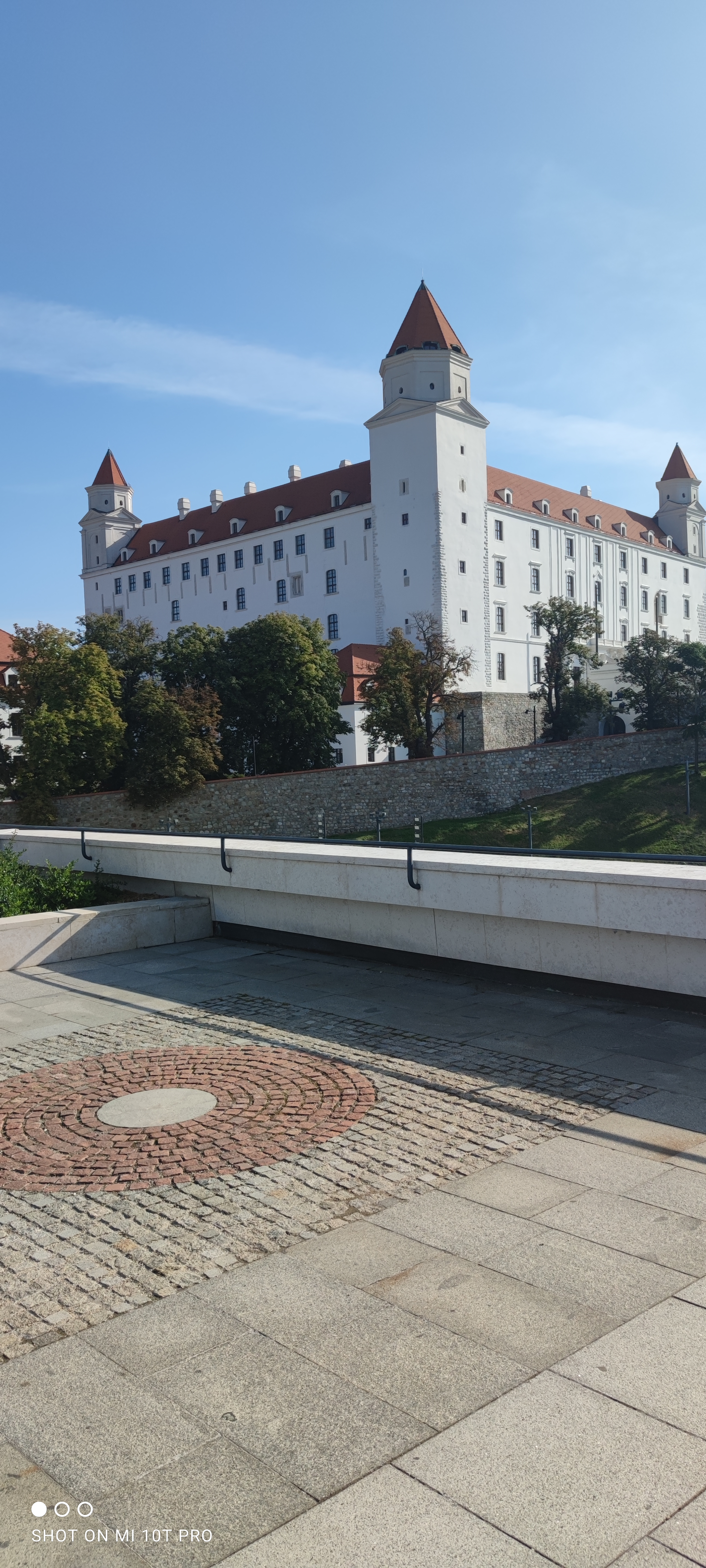
Bratislava Castle (view from the National Council of the Slovak Republic)

- Sigismund Gate in the southeast—the best-preserved original part of the site, built in the 15th century
- Vienna Gate in the southwest—built in 1712
- Nicholas Gate in the northeast—built in the 16th century
- Leopold Gate

=== Other buildings ===
To the west of the main building is the newly reconstructed F. A. Hillebrandt building, which dates from 1762 and was destroyed by the 1811 fire. The Yard of Honor, the space directly before the castle entrance, dates from the late 18th century.
Inside the Sigismund Gate and below the Court of Honor is the Leopold Yard with bastions, constructed in the 17th century.
To the east of the castle building, the constellation of the Great Moravian basilica (9th century), the Church of St Savior (11th century), and other early medieval objects is indicated on the ground. The true archaeological findings are directly below this indicated constellation.

Adjacent to the Nicholas Gate, a Gothic gateway from the 15th century in the northeast quadrant, is the Lugiland Bastion. This is a long three-floor building from the 17th century that currently houses the National Council of the Slovak Republic and a Baroque stable (today a restaurant). A French baroque garden is located to the south of the stable.
The northern border of the site is formed by a long Baroque building from the 18th century, which today houses the Slovak National Museum and the castle administration.

== History ==
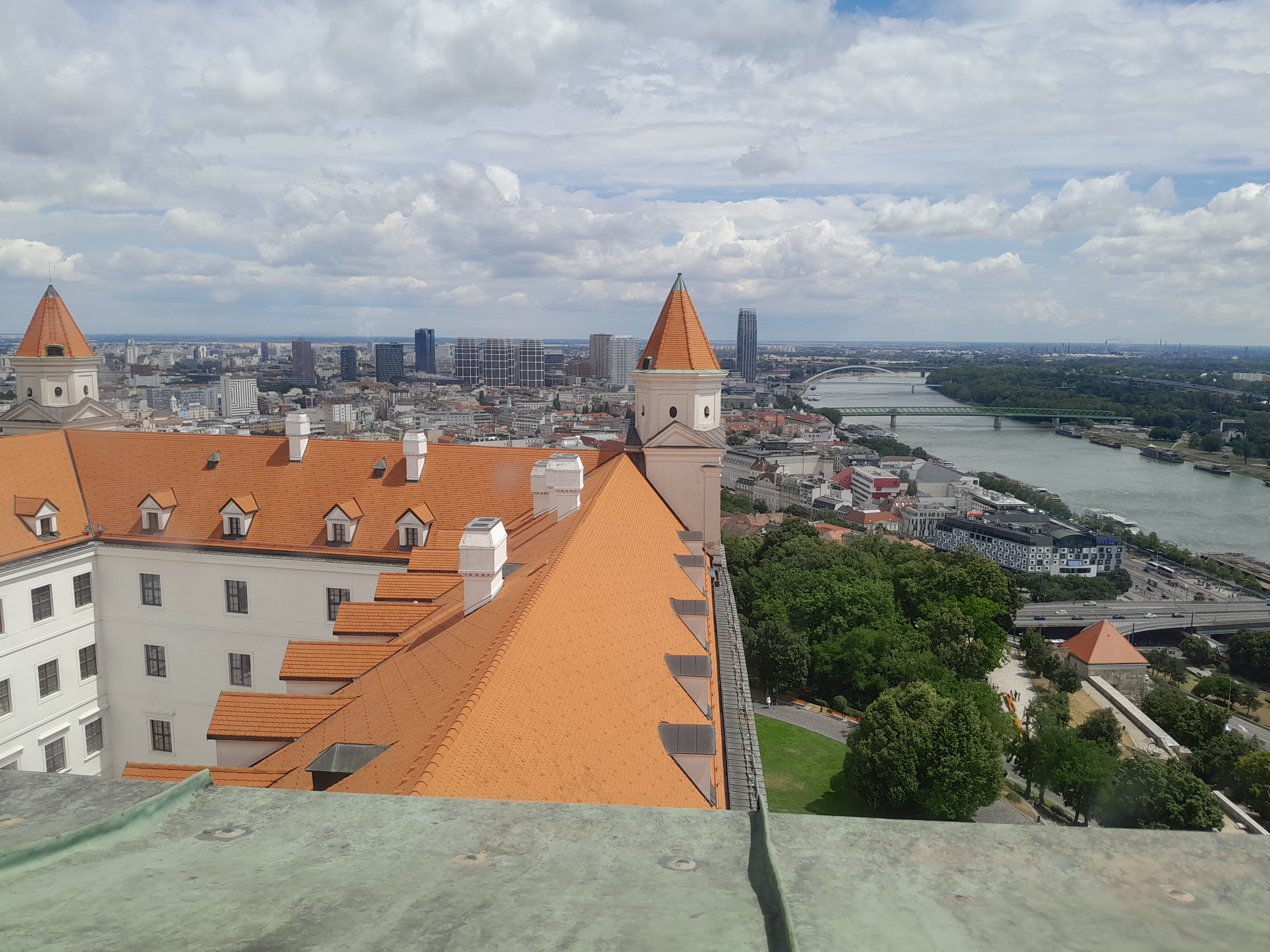
View of Bratislava from the castle

=== Prehistory (2800–450 BC) ===
The castle's site, like today's city, has been inhabited for thousands of years, because it is strategically located in the center of Europe at a passage between the Carpathians and the Alps, at an important ford used to cross the Danube river, and at an important crossing of central European ancient (trade) routes running from the Balkans or the Adriatic Sea to the Rhine river or the Baltic Sea, the most important route being the Amber Route.

The people of the Boleráz culture (the oldest phase of the Baden culture) were the first known culture to have constructed settlements on the castle hill. This happened around 3500 BC (i.e., in the high Eneolithic Period). Their "castle" was a fortified settlement and a kind of acropolis for settlements in today's Old Town of Bratislava.

Further major findings from the castle hill are from the Hallstatt Period (Early Iron Age, 750 –450 BC). At that time, the people of the Kalenderberg Culture constructed a building plunged into the rock of the castle hill. Again, the "castle" served as an acropolis for settlements found in the western part of the Old Town.

=== Celts and Romans (450 BC – 5th century AD) ===
During the La Tène Period (Late Iron Age, Celtic Period, 450 BC –1 BC), the castle hill became an important center of the Celts. In the last century BC (after 125 BC), it served as the acropolis of an oppidum (town) of the Celtic Boii. A great number and diversity of findings (including coins, house equipment, two Roman buildings, castle entrance gate, etc.) testifies to this.

The castle hill, which was situated at the Danube and thus since 9 BC at the border of the Roman Empire, was also settled by the Romans during the Roman Period (1st to 4th century AD), as findings of bricks of Roman legions (Legion XIII GAN, Legion X GEPF etc.) and some parts of architecture (a Roman figural relief, roof parts, etc.) suggest.

The developments in the 5th century (the time of the Great Migration of Peoples) are largely unclear.

=== Slavs, Nitrian Principality, Great Moravia (500–907) ===
The situation changed with the arrival of the Slavs in the territory of Bratislava. Initially, they partly used older Roman and Celtic structures and added some fortifications. Probably at the end of the 8th century (definitely not later than in the early 9th century), at the time of the Principality of Nitra, a Slavic castle with a wooden rampart was constructed, with a huge area of 55,000 square metres. In the second half of the 9th century, at the time of Great Moravia, a palace of stone surrounded by dwellings and a big basilica were added.

The basilica is the largest Great Moravian basilica from the territory of Slovakia, and the area of the castle is approximately the same as that of the Mikulčice site (the historical town "Moravia"), which is the most important Great Moravian archaeological site.

Great Moravian basilica at Bratislava castle

Material from old Roman buildings was used to construct this Slavic castle in Bratislava. This could be a confirmation of the disputed statement of Aventinus from the 16th century, who—referring to lost sources—claimed that around 805/7, the Great Moravian prince Uratislaus (i.e., Vratislav) constructed today's Bratislava (castle?) at the place of a destroyed Roman frontier fort called Pisonium, and the new settlement was named after him, Uratislaburgium/Wratisslaburgium. Another probable fact is that around 900, the castle and the territory it controlled was given in fief to Predslav, the third son of the Great Moravian king Svatopluk I and that Pre(d) slav, or a person of the same name, is the person after which the castle and the town received its old German name Pressburg (from which the old Slovak name Prešporek is derived).

The oldest version of this name was Preslava (Slovak) / Preslav(a) sburg (German). It appeared for the first time in 907 (Battle of Pressburg) in the forms Brezalauspurc(h), Braslavespurch, and Pressalauspruch, and then around 1000 on Hungarian coins as Preslav(v) a Civitas (meaning Bratislava Castle). On the other hand, the exact location of Brezalauspurc is still disputed.

=== High and Late Middle Ages (907–1531) ===
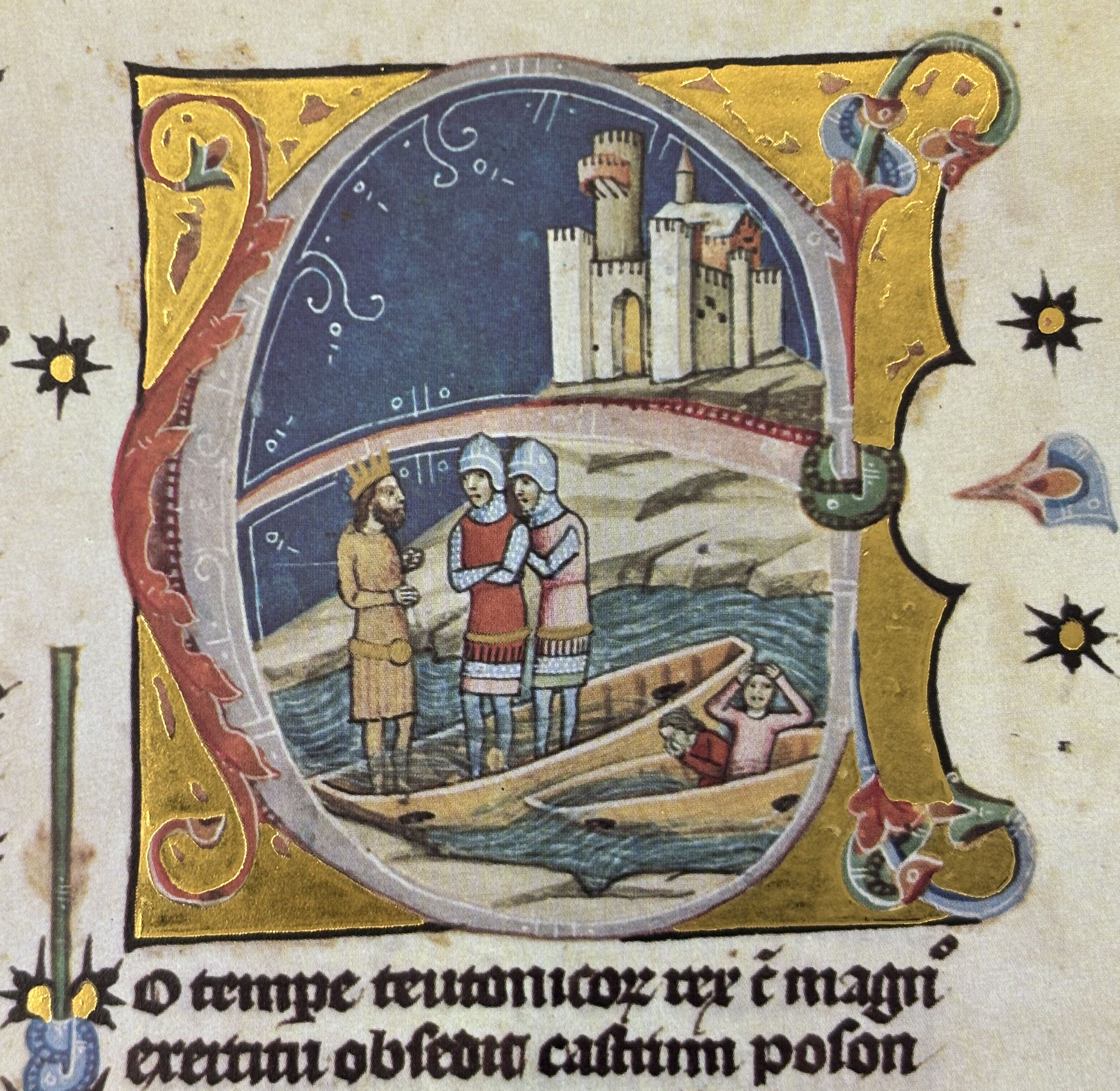
Emperor Henry III losing his fleet below Pressburg Castle during the failed German Siege of 1052, depicted in the 14th-century manuscript Illuminated Chronicle

The construction of a new castle of stone started in the 10th century, but work lagged. Under King Stephen I of Hungary (1000–1038), however, the castle was already one of the central castles of the Kingdom of Hungary. It became the seat of Pozsony county and protected the kingdom against Bohemian (Czech) and German attacks (e.g., in 1030, 1042, 1052, 1108, 1146) and played an important role in throne struggles, such as the one following the death of Stephen I. In 1052, Henry III tried to occupy the castle. According to Hungarian tradition, Zotmund, a Hungarian soldier, swam to the ships of the invading fleet to drill holes in them, and they were sunk. King Solomon of Hungary had lived here until he was taken to the jail of Nitra, according to Ladislaus I's order. At the same time, the old rampart was modernized, and the Church of the St. Savior, with a chapter and a church school, were added. Stephen III of Hungary escaped from his enemies to the castle almost 100 years later.

The castle was turned into a proto-Romanesque palace of stone in the 12th century (probably after 1179), possibly because Béla III (1173–1196) decided to make Esztergom the definitive seat of kings of Hungary. It was a palace similar to those constructed in Germany under Friedrich Barbarossa. In 1182, Friedrich Barbarossa gathered his crusader army under the castle. The church institutions and building at the castle were moved to the town below the castle in the early 12th century.

The well-fortified Pressburg castle was among the few in the Kingdom of Hungary to be able to withstand Mongol attacks in 1241 and 1242. As a reaction to these attacks, a huge "tower for the protection of the kingdom" was constructed at the castle building in 1245, immediately next to two older palaces. The tower was actually a huge residential building. In addition, seven square towers were built into the old rampart, and a stone wall was added around the castle proper (i.e., the residential building). The biggest of the rampart towers was at the same time a corner tower of the stone wall. Today, it is part of the castle building—it is identical to the present-day "crown tower", which is the largest of the four existing towers of the structure. It was probably built around 1250, when the Knights of St. John were active at the castle.

On 25 October 1265, the Czech king, Přemysl Otakar, and the Hungarian king Béla IV's grandchild Kunigunde, were engaged here. Andrew II and Gertrude's daughter, Elisabeth was born here. The new castle faced further conflicts. In 1271, king Otakar II of Bohemia invaded Hungarian territory (today's western Slovakia) and charged the knight Egid with the administration of the conquered castle. Egid rebelled two years later and was defeated, but due to problems in Bohemia, Otakar had to leave this territory. In 1285–86, the noble Nicholas Kőszegi occupied the castle in order to use it as a basis for a rebellion against the Hungarian king, but he was defeated. Shortly afterwards, in 1287–1291, the Austrian duke Albert of Habsburg, supporting Nicholas, occupied the castle but was defeated by Matthew III Csák, who was made head of Pozsony county. A successful Austrian occupation of the castle and the county occurred in 1302–1312/1322 by Duke Rudolf.

As a result of this permanent fighting, the Hungarian king granted the city rights (town charter) to a part of the settlements below the castle in 1291, thereby withdrawing them from the authority of the county head in the castle. Some settlements on the castle hill remained under the castle's authority, and the fortification was gradually extended to them.

In 1385, king Sigismund of Luxembourg occupied the castle and Pozsony county and one year later put the county in pawnage to his cousins, the Moravian margraves Prokop and Jošt, in exchange for a loan. The castle was reconquered by Stibor of Stiboricz in 1389, who was made the head of Pozsony county in 1389–1402 as a reward. He had a chapel built in Bratislava Castle.

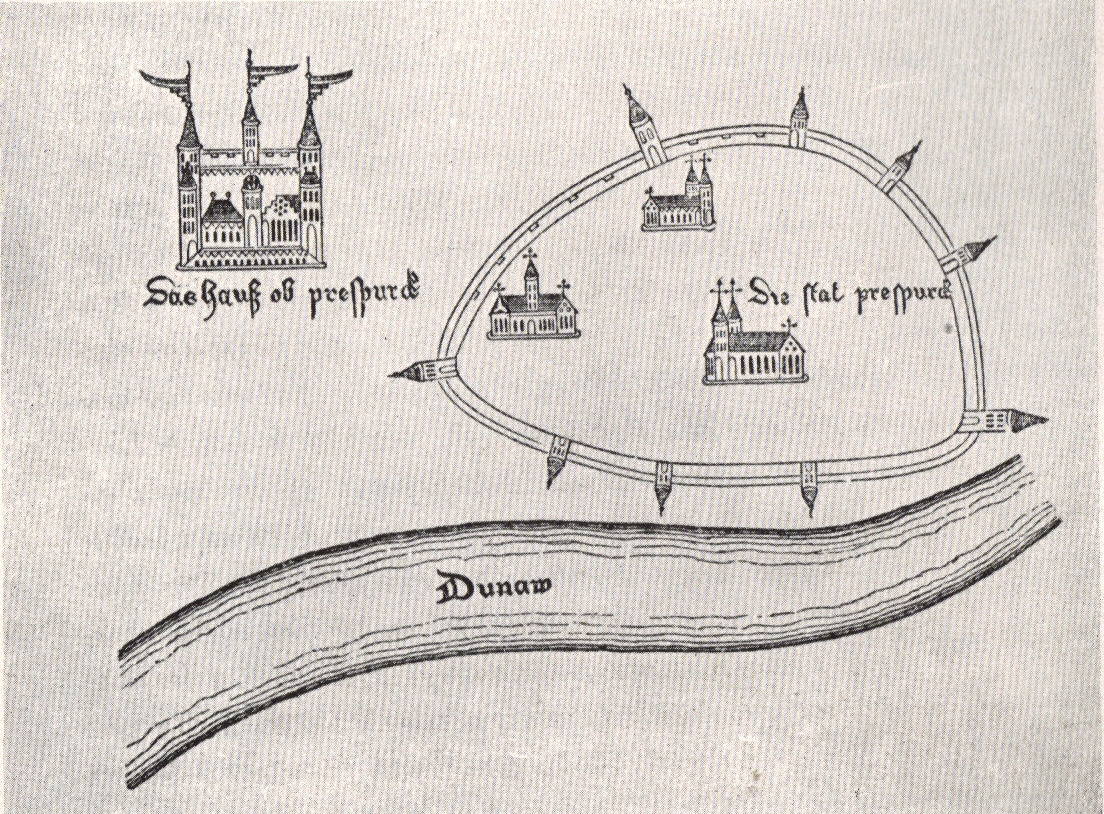
The castle and the town of Pressburg on a picture from the 15th century

Another ally of king Sigismund, especially in his fights against the Czech Hussites, was the noble family Rozgonyi, which received the Pozsony county head function in 1421. At some point between 1420 and 1430, Sigismund (Holy Roman Emperor) decided to make Bratislava Castle –due to its central location —the center of his new German-Czech-Hungarian empire. In 1423, the king ordered the Rozgonyis to improve the fortifications of the castle as a protection against Hussite attacks, because it was situated close to the Czech border and was only protected by the old wooden ramparts. This was replaced with a stone bulwark. Between 1431 and 1434, a total rearrangement of Pressburg castle took place. Experts from Germany were invited, material was transported from Austria, and towns were imposed special taxes specifically for the construction of the largest castle ever built. The construction master was Konrad von Erlingen. The residential "tower" was demolished, and the form of the new Gothic palace was approximately similar to that of the present-day castle (but without two towers). Today, the only completely preserved part of the castle from that time is the Sigismund Gate (wrongly called the Corvinus Gate), i.e., the eastern entrance gate in the bulwark. Smaller parts have been preserve in the main palace. Sigismund's plans, however, did not materialize, because the castle never became his residence, and he remained in the town below the castle.

After Sigismund's death in 1437, his widow, Barbara of Celje, was imprisoned in the castle by the new king, Albert of Habsburg. In 1438, Albert's daughter, Anne, was engaged to the margrave William III, Landgrave of Thuringia in the castle. John Hunyadi and his wife Erzsébet Szilágyi also stayed here. Later on, Ladislas the Posthumous possibly lived in the castle (parts of it were adapted for him). In 1440–1443, there was fighting between Pressburg Castle, ruled by county heads from the Rozgonyi family (supporting king Władysław III of Poland) and the town of Pressburg itself. Castle repairs were conducted in 1438, 1452, and 1463. A water well was constructed in the yard of the castle in the 15th century.

=== Main castle of the Kingdom of Hungary (1531–1783) ===
==== Political events ====
In 1536 (de facto already in 1531), after the Turks had conquered present-day Hungary, Pressburg became the capital (seat of the diet and central authorities, place of coronations) of the remaining Kingdom of Hungary, which was renamed Royal Hungary and was ruled by the Austrian Habsburgs. Consequently, Pressburg Castle became the most important royal castle and the formal seat of the kings of Royal Hungary (who, however, resided in Vienna normally). At the same time, from the beginning of the 16th century, Pressburg and its castle had to face various anti-Habsburg uprisings in Royal Hungary on the territory of what is now Slovakia. For example, troops of Gabriel Bethlen occupied the castle between 1619 and 1621, when it was reconquered by Habsburg troops, and had the royal crown removed from Pressburg Castle until 1622. Between 1671 and 1677, Pressburg Castle was home to a court against the Protestants and participants of anti-Habsburg uprisings. Imre Thököly, the leader of another major anti-Habsburg uprising, failed to conquer the castle in 1682–83.

==== Holy Crown of Hungary in the crown tower ====
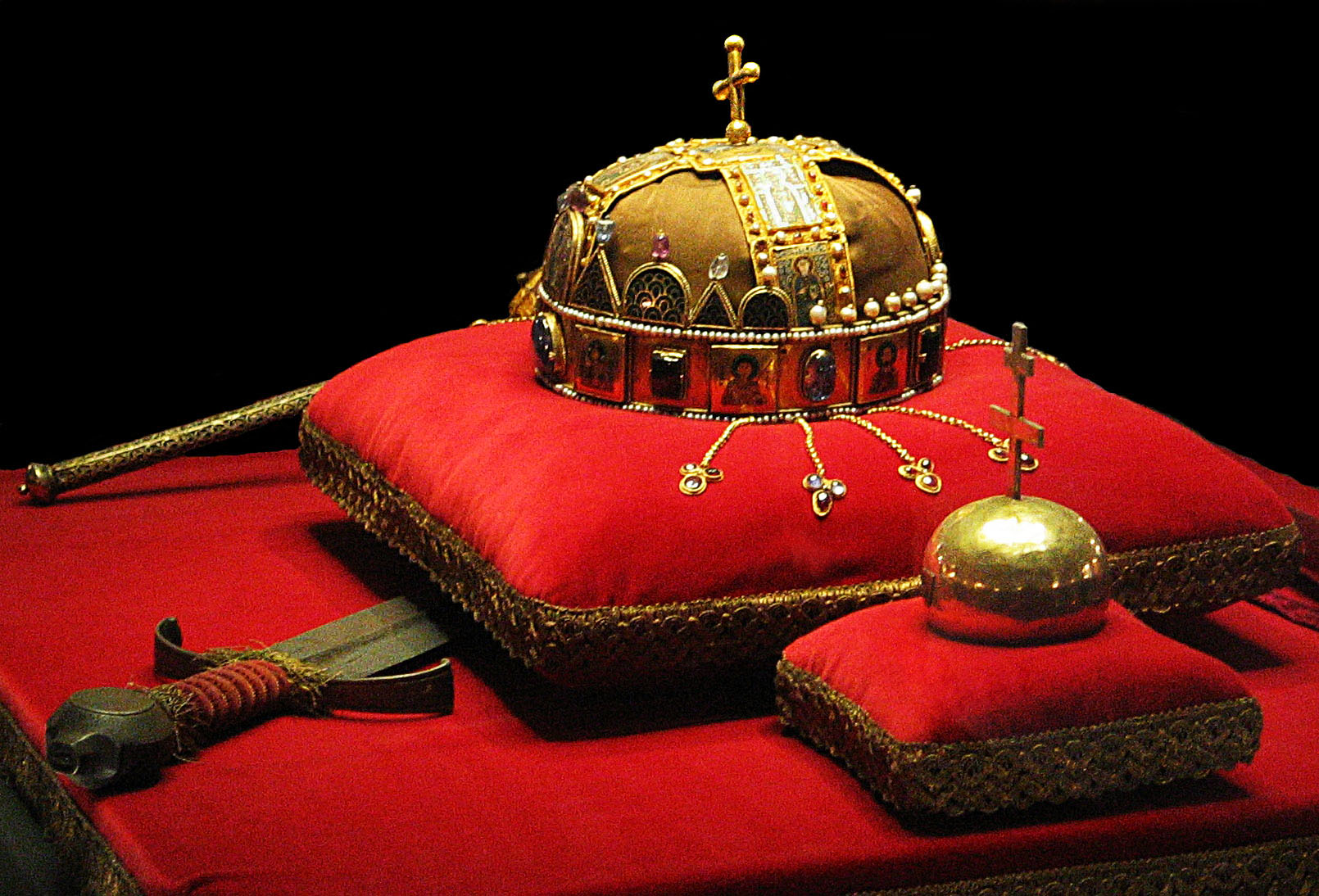
The Crown, Sword, and Globus Cruciger of Hungary used to be kept in the Crown Tower of the castle.

Between 1552 and 1784, the Holy Crown of Hungary stayed in the castle. Two Hungarian crown guards, fifty Hungarian and fifty Austrian infantry soldiers cared for it. Hungarian kings who derived from foreign dynasties as Habsburgs could not possess it and only had access to the crown during their coronation ceremony.

==== Renaissance conversion ====
Immediately after the defeat of the Kingdom of Hungary at the battle at Mohács in 1526, during which the king died, the queen—Maria of Habsburg—fled with her retinue from Buda to Pressburg. The royal treasure (mostly valuable objects of art, the royal scepter, apple, and sword) and many other important objects she has taken with her were deposited in Pressburg Castle and guarded by the royal burgrave John Bornemisza. Shortly afterwards, however, this precious treasure was mostly destroyed by the new king Ferdinand I of Habsburg, who needed it to finance his participation in a civil war in Royal Hungary, and smaller parts went to the Treasury Chamber of Vienna (Wiener Schatzkammer) or became personal property of Maria, or were lost forever.

Taking into account the new role of the castle, Ferdinand I had it rebuilt into a Renaissance castle by Italian builders and artists, such as Giulio Licino da Pordanone and Maciotanus Ulisses from Rome, between 1552 and 1562 (with some work continuing even afterwards). The main designer and supervisor of the construction was the Italian architect Pietro Ferrabosco, who had been serving the emperor in Vienna and knew Count Eck Salm, the captain of Pressburg from 1552 –1571. The building's form did not change (except that the entrance was shifted), but it was completely changed inside and outside. Above all, floors and rooms were rearranged, and most rooms received precious ornaments. In the late 16th century, a building for ball games at the eastern wall and a second, better water well were added. Other improvements were made and structures added over the years.

In terms of the castle's functions after 1530, it was home to selected participants of diet meetings, and since 1552, it has held the crown jewels, in what is today known as the Crown Tower.

==== Baroque conversions ====
===== Early Baroque =====
Since some of the Renaissance changes were done in haste (especially the wooden roof), as early as in 1616, a new, gradual Early Baroque reconstruction started, based on a design by the main imperial architect Giovanni Battista Carlone. The works were intensified in 1635 and finished around 1647. It was mostly financed by Count Paul Pálffy, the captain of the castle and head of Pozsony county. The look the castle received through this conversion is basically the one it has kept to the present. The northern and western part of the main building were newly built and a new, third floor was added; the main entrance was shifted back to the middle of the wall; the ancient fortifications were improved; the chapel was shifted from the southern part to the northern part (today's Music Hall); and two new towers were added—yielding in sum the present four towers in the corners. As a reward for not having misappropriated state funds during the conversion, the diet appointed Pálffy lifelong captain of Pressburg Castle, head of Pozsony county, and usufructuary of the castle (which remained in possession of the crown), in 1650. One year later, the emperor made those functions and titles hereditary for the Pálffys.

In 1653, all wooden ceilings turned out to be defective and had to be replaced in the following years, so that precious paintings placed on them got lost. Ten years later, facing one of the frequent Turkish attacks to the territory of Slovakia, the fortifications were improved under the leadership of military engineer Josef Priami of the Imperial Court in Vienna; further improvements of the fortifications followed around 1673. They ended with the final defeat of the Turks at Vienna in 1683. In 1703, barracks were built in the northeast of the site, and the armoury was turned into barracks as well. The present-day Vienna Gate was constructed on the occasion of the coronation of Emperor Charles VI in 1712, and it has been used as the main entrance to the castle since then.

===== Maria Theresa conversion =====
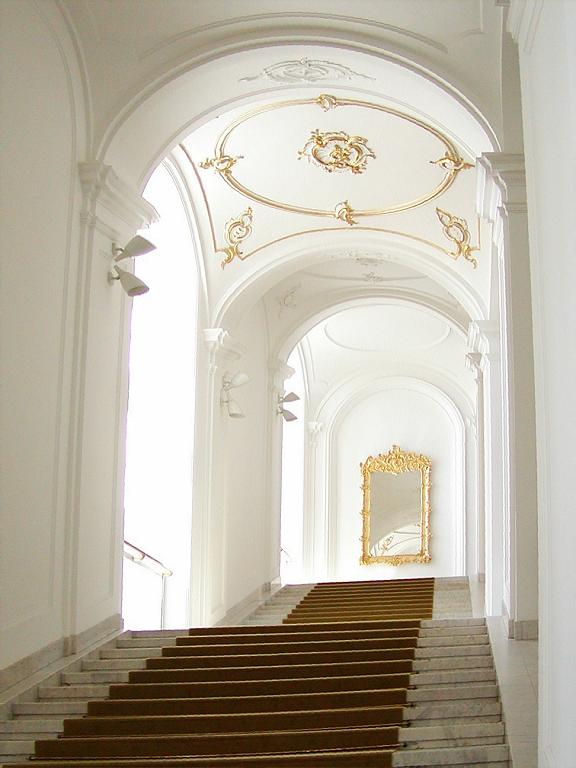
The grand staircase dates to the times of Queen Maria Theresa.

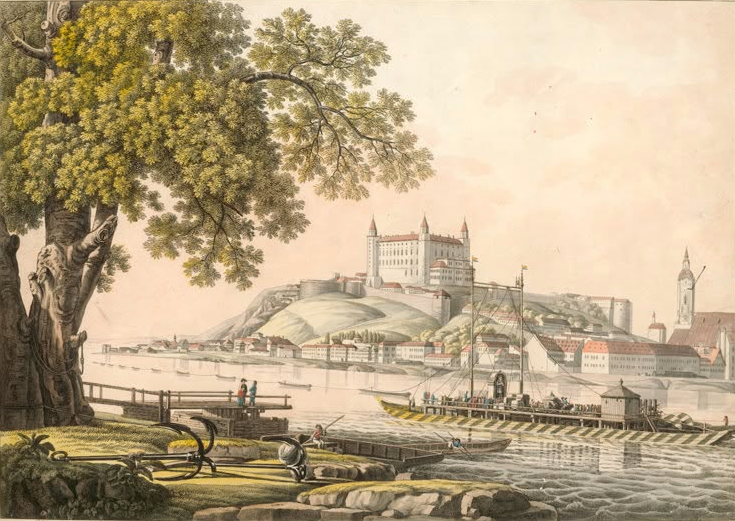
Bratislava castle in 1805

When Maria Theresa of Austria became the queen of the Kingdom of Hungary in 1740, she promised to the nobles of the kingdom that she would have a residence both in Pressburg and in Austria. A corresponding conversion of the defensive castle into a modern royal residence was performed between 1761 and 1766.

Minor changes were made as early as 1740: besides various changes in the interior, a large garden was added in the northern part of the site, and Emperor Francis I (Maria Theresa's husband, who was interested in botany) created a small garden to the east of the castle building. The chief designer until 1757 was J. B. Martinelli.

Major changes inside the castle (in the rococo style) were begun in 1760. The chief designer between 1761 and 1762 was Franz Anton Hillebrandt. A new single-story building for the kitchen, servants, and horses was added to the western wall of the castle. Because the water supply for the castle was not sufficient, Maria Theresa had Johann Wolfgang von Kempelen build a special water pipe drawing water from a tank in the town at the Danube bank, using pumps. The stairs throughout the castle were rebuilt with a lower gradient, on Maria Theresa's request, to enable her to ride her horse upon them. The result of these changes, as for the exterior of the palace itself and the site gates, was very similar to Bratislava Castle as it stands today.

Due to disputes with Hungarian nobles, Maria Theresa did not appoint a palatine, who used to represent the nobles, and instead in 1765 appointed a governor for the Kingdom of Hungary, who obeyed the queen. Bratislava Castle became his seat, and the office of the county head left the castle. The second governor was Albert of Saxe-Teschen, from 1765, the queen's son-in-law—the husband of her favorite daughter, Marie Christine of Austria. Albert and Maria Christine moved to the castle in 1766. Since both of them were promoters of culture and science, the castle and the town became places of frequent events and visits in the sphere of culture and science.

Because the governor did not have enough space, a new palace (later called the Theresianum) was built at the eastern wall of the castle building in 1767–1770, designed by F. A. Hillebrandt in the classic style. Its furnishings were expensive and precious and included hundreds of objects of art. The first floor was home to a family gallery, which later became the basis of today's Albertina Gallery in Vienna.

In addition, a winter riding school was added at the northern end of the castle site, a summer riding school was situated directly in the castle yard, both castle gardens were adapted (in the Schönbrunn style), and night lighting using oil lanterns was introduced on the access road to the castle for the first time in history. In 1770, Maria Theresa herself ordered further valuable paintings and furniture to be provided to both the main castle and the Theresianum, and the governor moved into the completed building.

=== Loss of importance and destruction (1783–1811) ===
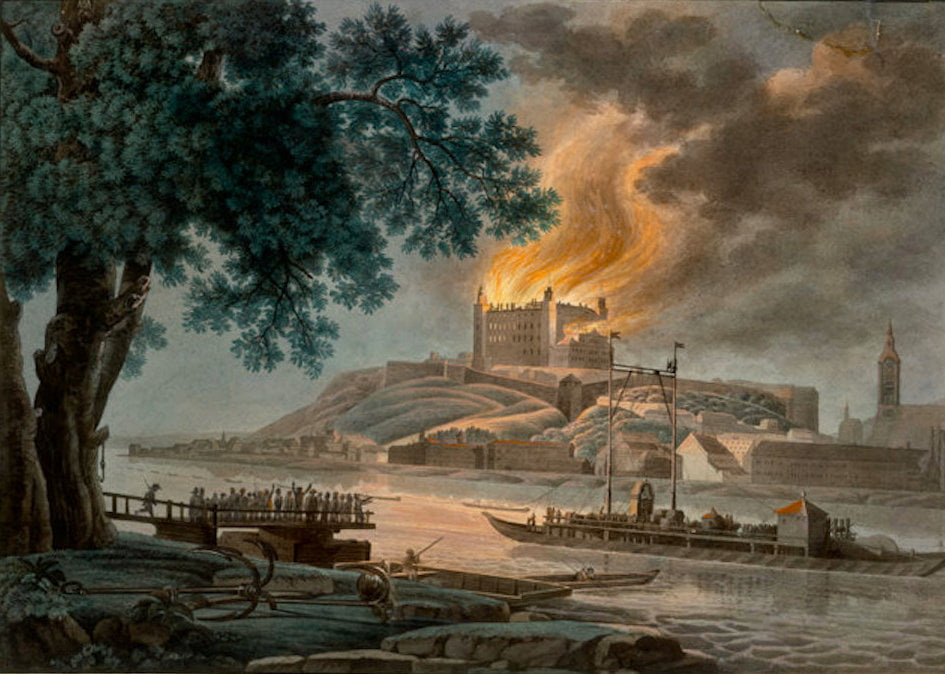
In 1811, a huge fire raged through Bratislava Castle, destroying the main palace and more than 70 nearby houses.

The office of governor of the Kingdom of Hungary was re-abolished in 1781 by the new king, Joseph II, and Albert of Sachsen-Teschen left the castle and took many parts of the equipment away. The (present-day Albertina Gallery) art collection went partly to Vienna and partly to Belgium, where Albert became a new governor. Other objects moved mostly to Vienna. In 1783, Pressburg ceased to be the seat of central authorities of the kingdom; they were moved to Buda (now Budapest). The crown jewels of the Kingdom of Hungary were moved to the Hofburg in Vienna.

In 1784, the Theresianum, some other secondary buildings of the site, and the gardens were adapted, as the castle became a "general seminary", which was a type of state school for Catholic priests introduced by Joseph II. The general seminary of Pressburg Castle played an important role in Slovakia's history, having educated many important Slovak intellectuals, such as Anton Bernolák, the author of the first successful codification of the Slovak standard language.

In 1802, the general seminary moved to another place, and the castle was assigned to the military as a barracks. This was the beginning of its end. The rococo interiors of the castle were adapted in order to house some 1,500 soldiers. In 1809, Pressburg and the castle were bombarded by Napoleon's troops. On 28 May 1811, the castle burst into flames caused by the carelessness of garrison soldiers; the fire spread to parts of the town.

=== Castle in ruins (1811–1953) ===
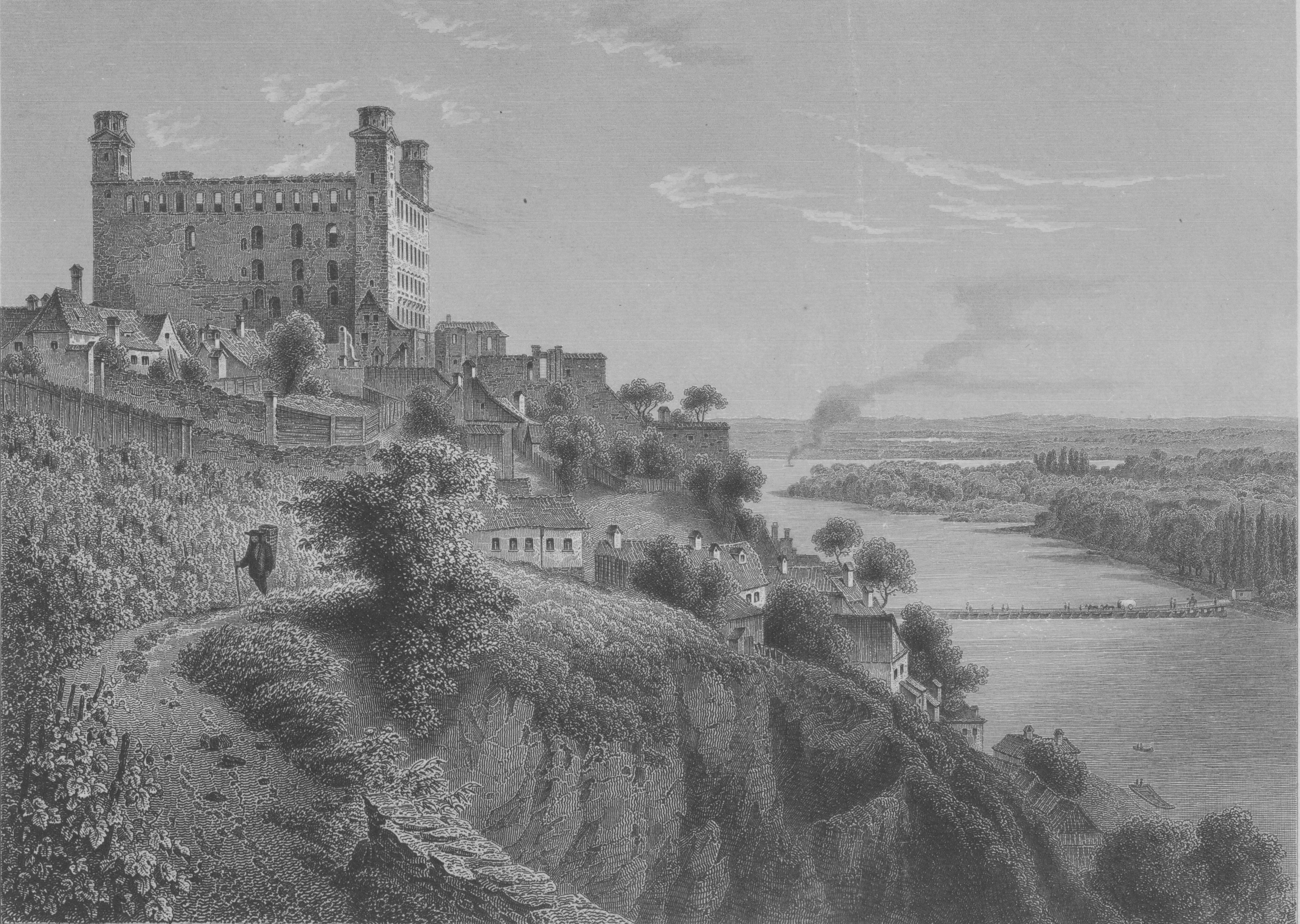
Pressburg Castle, mid-19th century

The destroyed castle gradually deteriorated, and the military sold parts of the main buildings as construction materials to the surrounding areas. Between the two world wars, attempts were made to demolish the castle to build government offices and a university district on the castle hill and in its surroundings in the first Czechoslovak Republic and the first Slovak Republic. Many parts of the site continued to be used as barracks and adapted accordingly until 1946.

In 1946, the ruin was opened to the public. Two years later, the town constructed an amphitheater in the northern part of the castle site; this remained in use for some fifteen years. Films were shown there in the summer.

=== Restoration and modern history (after 1953) ===
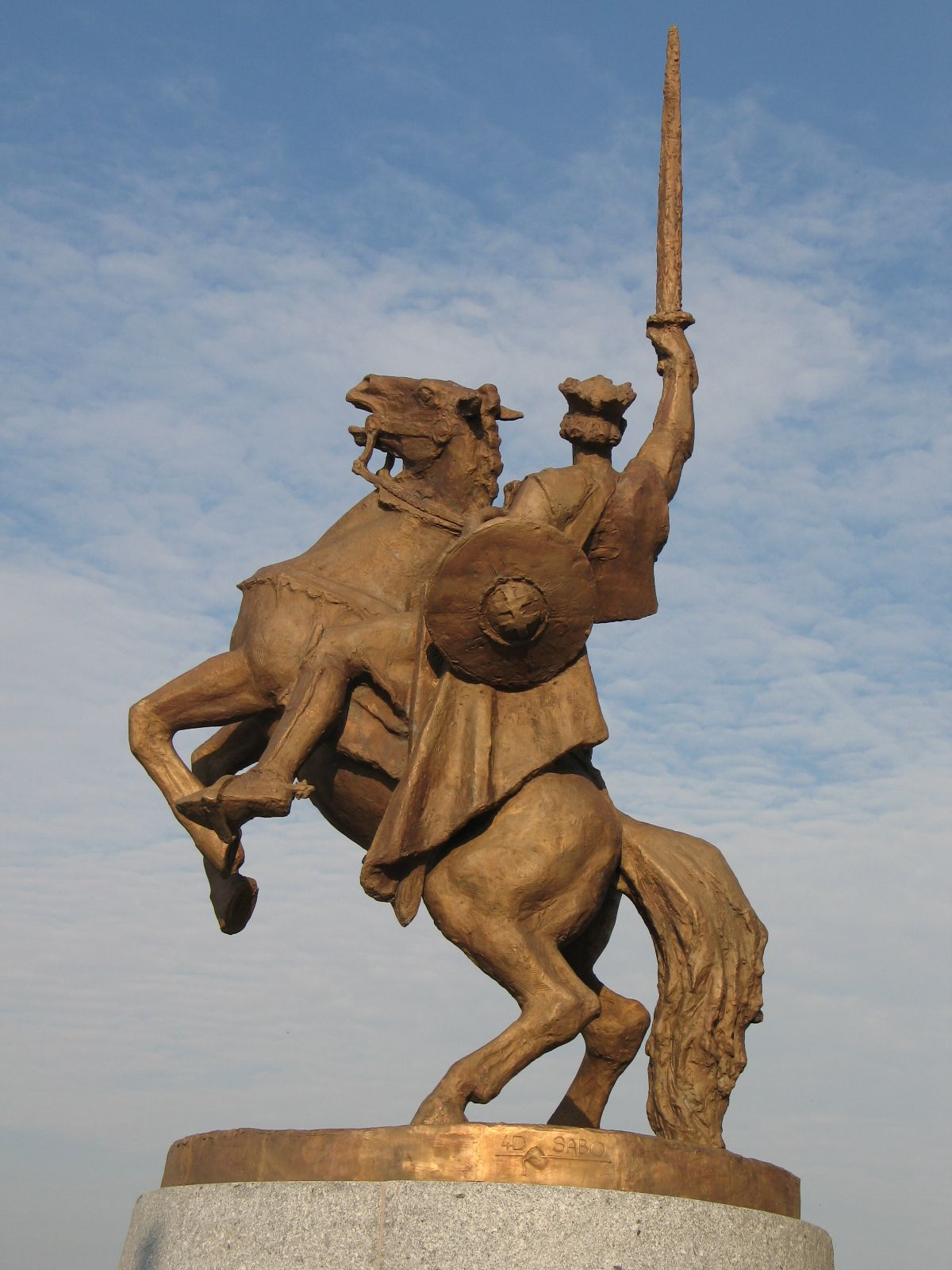
Equestrian statue of Svatopluk I, at the Honorary Courtyard since 2010

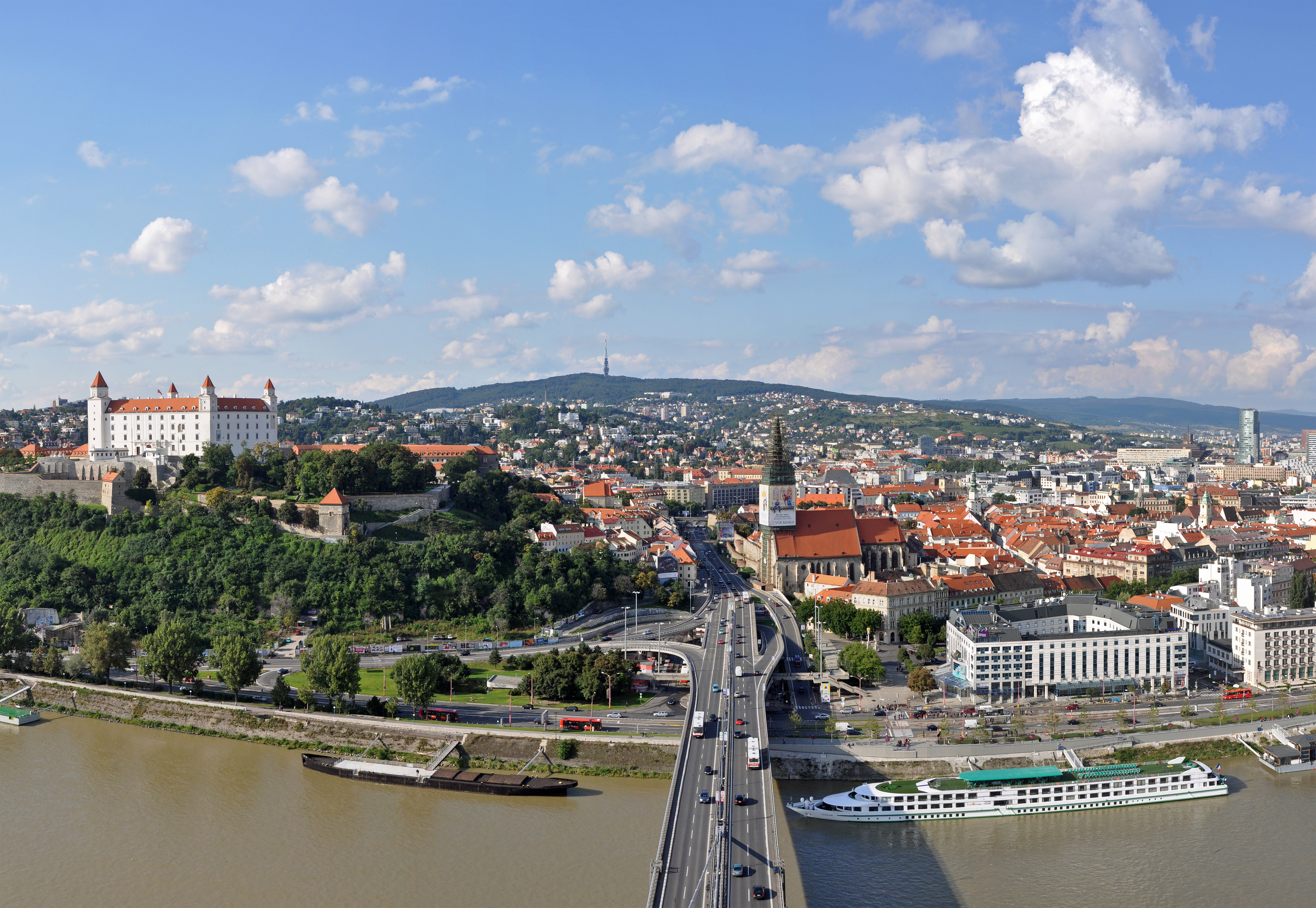
Bratislava Castle and the roofs of the Old Town

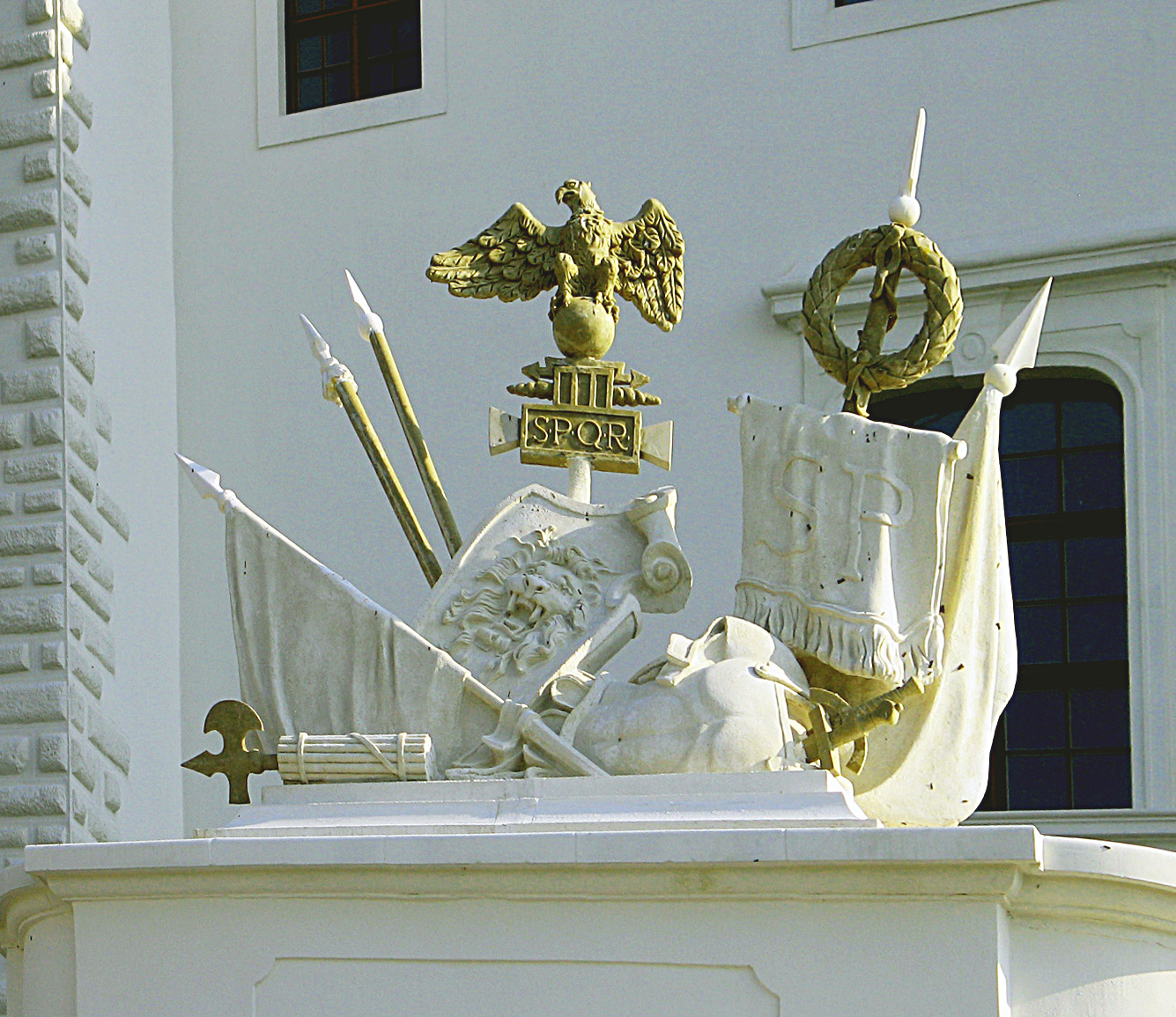
Reconstructed trophy that has been restored as part of renovation efforts

Finally, it was decided to restore the castle. Archaeological and architectural research started in 1953, and long restoration works began in 1957. The restoration was done to the last (Baroque) state of the main building, but at many places, older (Gothic, Renaissance) preserved elements or parts have been restored. The Theresianum has not been renovated, and the F. A. Hillebrandt building of 1762 was restored only around the year 2000. The Slovak painter Janko Alexy gained recognition for his work on the castle. Construction was halted in August 1968, when the castle was occupied by Warsaw Pact troops as part of the Prague Spring. On 28 October 1968, however, the Federation Law, turning the centralist state of Czechoslovakia into a federation of a Czech Socialist Republic and a Slovak Socialist Republic, was signed in the Federation Hall of the castle. On 3 September 1992, the new constitution of independent Slovakia was signed in the Knights Hall.

Since 1968, the castle has housed exhibitions of the Slovak National Museum, and at the same time, its rooms have been used by the National Council of the Slovak Republic for presentation purposes. A new restoration has been planned for years, because since 1968, only minor adaptations have been performed, such as the 1988 creation of the Treasure Chamber, the 1995 replacement of glass in the arcades of the solemn staircase, and the 1996–97 complete repair of the roof. The last minor adaptations occurred on the occasion of the Bush-Putin Bratislava summit, in February 2005. A massive reconstruction was started in 2008 and was expected to last five years and cost 1.5–2 billion Slovak korunas (47.06–62.75 million euro).

On 6 June 2010, the reconstruction of the Honorary Courtyard of Bratislava Castle was completed, with a nationally televised unveiling ceremony of an equestrian statue of Svatopluk by sculptor Ján Kulich.

== See also ==
- History of Bratislava
