= German–Hungarian war =

German–Hungarian war or German invasion of Hungary may refer to:

- German–Hungarian War (1030–1031), the Holy Roman Empire's first failed attempt to subjugate Hungary
- German invasion of Hungary (1063), the Holy Roman Empire invading the Kingdom of Hungary
- German invasion of Hungary (1944), the occupation of Hungary by the Wehrmacht during World War II
